= List of populated places in Çankırı Province =

Places in Turkey

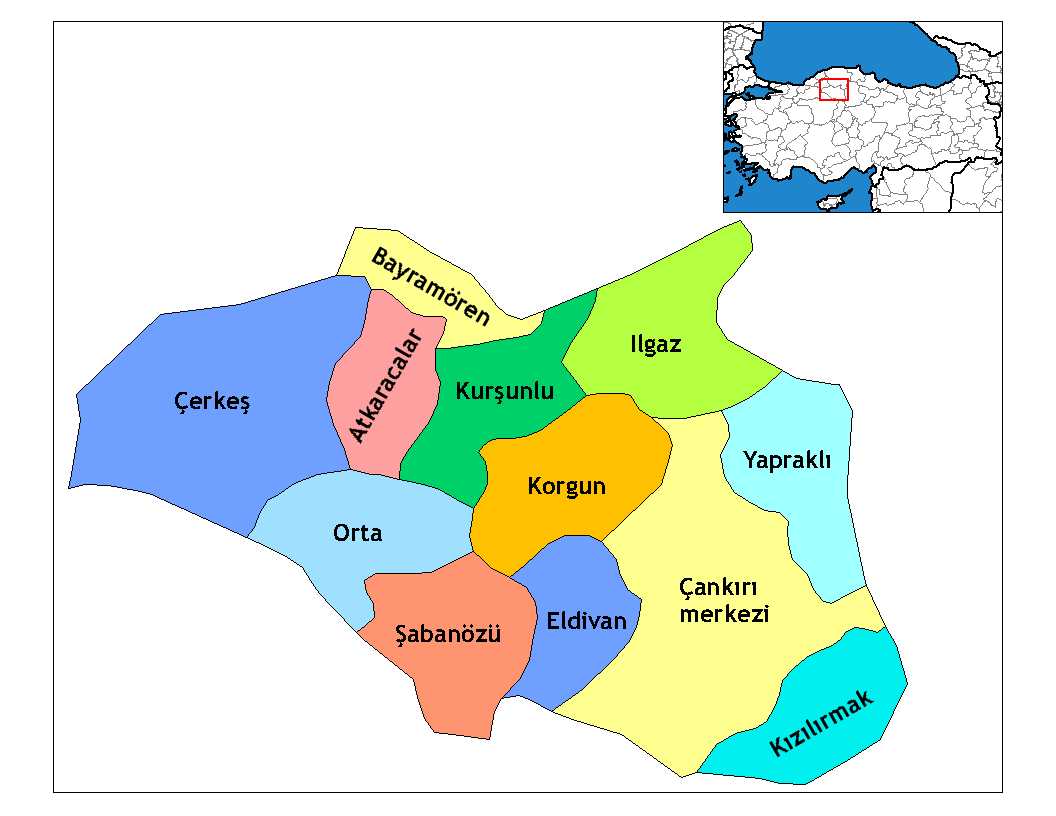
Çankırı Province

Below is the list of populated places in Çankırı Province, Turkey by the districts.

== Çankırı (Merkez) ==
- Çankırı
- Ağzıbüyük
- Ahlat
- Akçavakıf
- Akören
- Alaçat
- Alıca
- Altınlı
- Aşağıçavuş
- Aşağıpelitözü
- Aşağıyanlar
- Ayan
- Balıbağı
- Başeğmez
- Bayındır
- Beştut
- Bozkır
- Çağabey
- Çatalelma
- Çayırpınar
- Çırçır
- Çiviköy
- Danabaşı
- Dedeköy
- Değim
- Doğantepe
- Dutağaç
- Germece
- Handırı
- Hasakça
- Hıdırlık
- İçyenice
- İnaç
- İnandık
- İncik
- Karadayı
- Karaşeyh
- Kuzuköy
- Küçüklü
- Merzi
- Ovacık
- Paşaköy
- Pehlivanlı
- Satıyüzü
- Süleymanlı
- Taytak
- Tüney
- Tuzlu
- Ünür
- Yukarıçavuş
- Yukarıpelitözü

== Atkaracalar ==
- Atkaracalar
- Çardaklı
- Budakpınar
- Demirli
- Eyüpözü
- Hüyükköy
- Kızılibrik
- Kükürt
- Susuz
- Yakalı

== Bayramören ==
- Bayramören
- Akgüney
- Akseki
- Belenli
- Boğazkaya
- Çakırbağ
- Çayırcık
- Dalkoz
- Dereköy
- Dolaşlar
- Erenler
- Feriz
- Göynükören
- Harmancık
- İncekaya
- Karakuzu
- Karataş
- Kavakköy
- Koçlu
- Oluklu
- Oymaağaç
- Sarıkaya
- Topçu
- Üçgazi
- Yaylatepesi
- Yazıören
- Yurtpınar
- Yusufoğlu

== Çerkeş ==
- Çerkeş
- Saçak
- Afşar
- Ağaca
- Akbaş
- Akhasan
- Aliözü
- Aydınlar
- Bayındır
- Bedil
- Belkavak
- Beymelik
- Bozoğlu
- Çakmak
- Çalcıören
- Çaylı
- Çördük
- Dağçukurören
- Dikenli
- Dodurga
- Fındıcak
- Gelik Ovacık
- Gökçeler
- Göynükçukuru
- Hacılar
- Halkaoğlu
- Kabakköy
- Kadıköy
- Kadıözü
- Karacahüyük
- Karamustafa
- Karaşar
- Karga
- Kısaç
- Kiremitçi
- Kuzdere
- Kuzören
- Meydanköy
- Örenköy
- Örenli
- Saraycık
- Şeyhdoğan
- Taşanlar
- Turbaşı
- Uluköy
- Yakuplar
- Yeniköy
- Yeşilöz
- Yıprak
- Yoncalı
- Yumaklı

== Eldivan ==
- Eldivan
- Akbulut
- Akçalı
- Alva
- Büyükhacıbey
- Çiftlikköy
- Çukuröz
- Elmacı
- Gölez
- Gölezkayı
- Hisarcık
- Hisarcıkkayı
- Küçükhacıbey
- Sarayköy
- Sarıtarla
- Seydiköy
- Yukarıyanlar

== Ilgaz ==
- Ilgaz
- Akçaören
- Aktaş
- Alıç
- Alibey
- Alpagut
- Arpayeri
- Aşağıbozan
- Aşağıdere
- Aşağımeydan
- Aşıklar
- Balcı
- Başdibek
- Belören
- Belsöğüt
- Beyköy
- Bozatlı
- Bucura Yenice
- Bükçük
- Çaltıpınar
- Candere
- Çatak
- Çeltikbaşı
- Cömert
- Çörekçiler
- Danişment
- Eksik
- Ericek
- Eskice
- Gaziler
- Gökçeyazı
- Güneyköy
- Hacıhasan
- İkikavak
- Ilısılık
- İnköy
- Kaleköy
- Kavaklı
- Kayı
- Kazancı
- Keseköy
- Kırışlar
- Kıyısın
- Kızılibrik
- Kurmalar
- Kuşçayırı
- Kuyupınar
- Mesutören
- Musaköy
- Mülayim
- Mülayimyenice
- Ödemiş
- Okçular
- Ömerli
- Onaç
- Sağırlar
- Saraycık
- Sarmaşık
- Satılar
- Sazak
- Seki
- Serçeler
- Şeyhyunus
- Söğütcük
- Süleymanhacılar
- Yalaycık
- Yaylaören
- Yazıköy
- Yenidemirciler
- Yerkuyu
- Yeşildumlupınar
- Yukarıbozan
- Yukarıdere
- Yukarımeydan
- Yuvademirciler
- Yuvasaray

== Kızılırmak ==
- Kızılırmak
- Aşağıalagöz
- Aşağıovacık
- Bayanpınar
- Bostanlı
- Boyacıoğlu
- Büyükbahçeli
- Cacıklar
- Güneykışla
- Hacılar
- Halaçlı
- Kahyalı
- Kapaklı
- Karadibek
- Karallı
- Karamürsel
- Karaömer
- Kavlaklı
- Kemallı
- Korçullu
- Kuzeykışla
- Sakarca
- Saraycık
- Tepealagöz
- Tımarlı
- Yeniyapan
- Yukarıalagöz

== Korgun ==
- Korgun
- Alpsarı
- Buğay
- Çukurören
- Dikenli
- Hıcıp
- İkiçam
- Ildızım
- Karatekin
- Kayıçivi
- Kesecik
- Maruf
- Şıhlar

== Kurşunlu ==
- Kurşunlu
- Ağılözü
- Başovacık
- Bereket
- Çatkese
- Çaylıca
- Çırdak
- Çukurca
- Dağören
- Demirciören
- Dumanlı
- Eskiahır
- Göllüce
- Hacımuslu
- Hocahasan
- İğdir
- Kapaklı
- Kızılca
- Köpürlü
- Madenli
- Sarıalan
- Sivricek
- Sumucak
- Sünürlü
- Taşkaracalar
- Yeşilören
- Yeşilöz

== Orta ==
- Dodurga
- Orta
- Yaylakent
- Buğurören
- Büğdüz
- Derebayındır
- Doğanlar
- Elden
- Elmalık
- Gökçeören
- Hasanhacı
- Hüyükköy
- İncecik
- Kalfat
- Karaağaç
- Kayıören
- Kırsakal
- Kısaç
- Ortabayındır
- Özlü
- Sakaeli
- Sakarcaören
- Salur
- Sancar
- Tutmaçbayındır
- Yenice
- Yuva

== Şabanözü ==
- Şabanözü
- Bakırlı
- Bulduk
- Bulgurcu
- Büyükyakalı
- Çapar
- Çaparkayı
- Çerçi
- Göldağı
- Gündoğmuş
- Kamışköy
- Karahacı
- Karakoçaş
- Karamusa
- Küçükyakalı
- Kutluşar
- Martköy
- Ödek
- Özbek

== Yapraklı ==
- Yapraklı
- Aşağıöz
- Ayseki
- Ayvaköy
- Bademçay
- Balıbıdık
- Belibedir
- Buğay
- Buluca
- Büyükakseki
- Çakırlar
- Çevrecik
- Çiçekköy
- Davutlar
- Doğanbey
- Gürmeç
- İkizören
- Karacaözü
- Kayacık
- Kaymaz
- Kirliakça
- Kıvcak
- Kullar
- Müsellim
- Ovacık
- Sarıkaya
- Sazcığaz
- Şeyhosman
- Sofuoğlu
- Subaşı
- Topuzsaray
- Yakadere
- Yakaköy
- Yamaçbaşı
- Yenice
- Yeşilyayla
- Yukarıöz
- Yüklü
- Zekeriyaköy
