= Demirli =

Demirli may refer to:

- Dəmirli, a village in Nagorno-Karabakh, Azerbaijan
- Demirli, Atkaracalar
- Demirli, Babadağ
- Demirli, Bucak, Turkey
- Demirli, Ergani
- Demirli, İhsaniye, a village in Afyonkarahisar Province, Turkey
- Demirli, Kulp
- the former name of Stavros, Larissa, a village in Thessaly, Greece
- the former name of Palaiofarsalos railway station in Thessaly, Greece
