= Şıhlar =

Şıhlar can refer to:

- Şıhlar, Alanya
- Şıhlar, Korgun
