= Bozkuş, Atkaracalar =

Village in Turkey

Bozkuş
- Neighbourhood
- Location in Turkey Bozkuş (Turkey Central Anatolia)
- Coordinates: 40.8295°N 33.1430°E
- Country: Turkey
- Province: Çankırı
- District: Atkaracalar
- Municipality: Çardaklı
- Population (2021): 265
- Time zone: UTC+3 (TRT)

Bozkuş is a neighbourhood of the town Çardaklı, Atkaracalar District, Çankırı Province, Turkey. Its population is 265 (2021).
