= Gümerdiğin =

Town in Turkey

- Neighbourhood
- A Gümerdiğin evening

- Location within Turkey Location within Turkey Central Anatolia
- Coordinates: 40°26′30″N 33°15′14″E
- Country: Turkey
- Province: Çankırı
- District: Şabanözü
- Municipality: Şabanözü
- Population (2021): 1,189
- Time zone: UTC+3 (TRT)

Gümerdiğin is a neighbourhood of the town Şabanözü, Şabanözü District, Çankırı Province, Turkey. Its population is 1,189 (2021). Before the 2013 reorganisation, it was a town (belde). Gümerdiğin is nearly 6 km northwest of Şabanözü and nearly 80 km from Ankara. Although Şabanözü is a district of Çankırı Province, Gümerdiğin is mostly in relation with Ankara.

== Economy ==
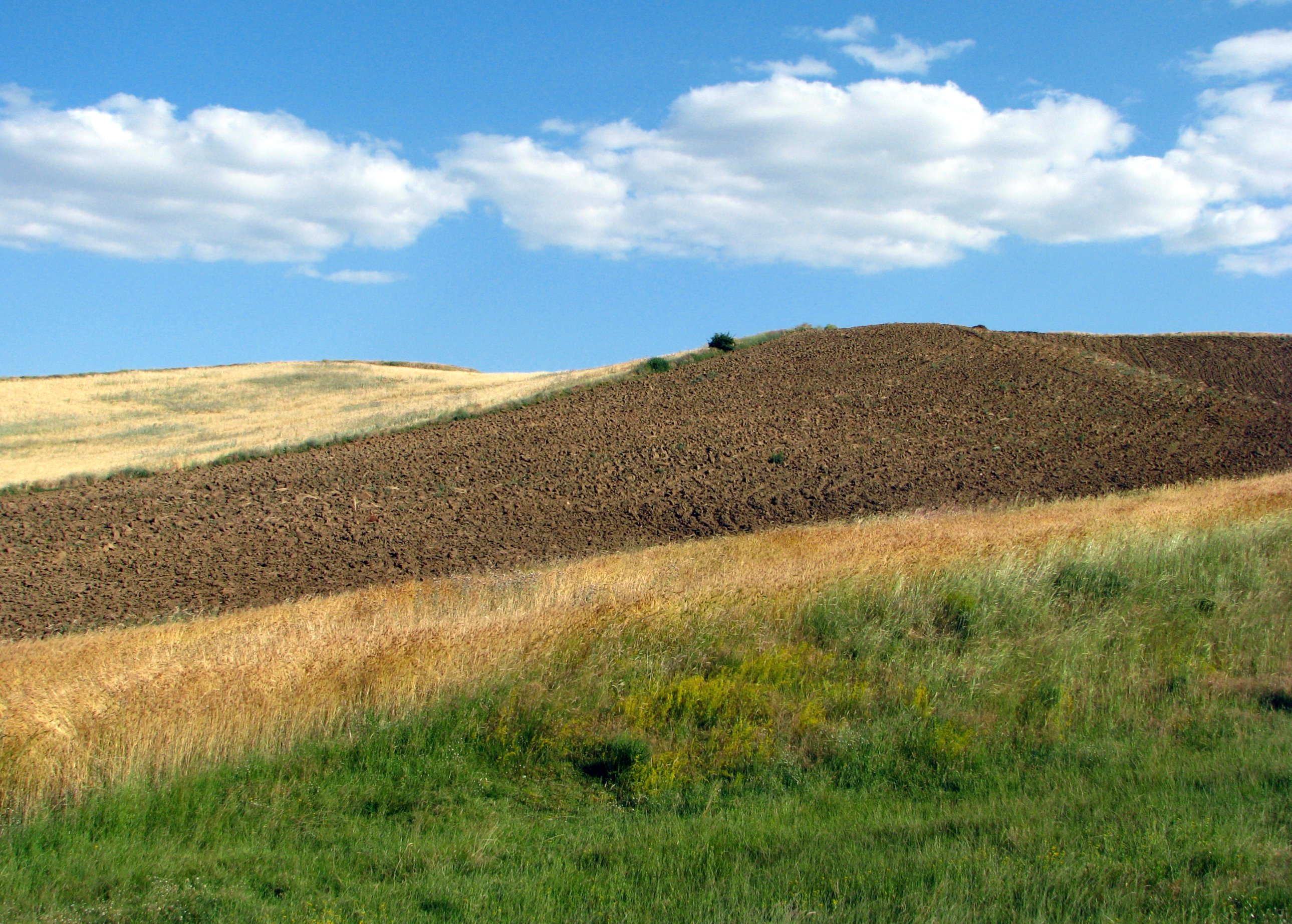
Fields

Agriculture is the main part of the economy. There are two artificial lakes and also Sanı Çayı is used to supply water for the fields. Wheat, beans, apple and vegetables are the main produce.

== Education ==
In Gümerdiğin there's a primary and a middle school, but not a high school. The students from some neighbouring villages attend school in Gümerdiğin.

== History ==
The town was named after Seljuk commander Humar Tigin, who came to the area after the Battle of Manzikert with his clan. The name was slowly corrupted over time to its present form Gümerdiğin.

== Health ==
In Gümerdiğin there's a state health office. In the office there a nurse, and a health officer but no doctor. When a doctor is needed people are transferred to Şabanözü, where there's a State Hospital. In Gümerdiğin there is also lack of a pharmacy and the medicine can also be obtained from Şabanözü.

== Demographics ==
Gümerdiğin's population is as follows;

Population in years
2007	Below 2000
2000	2.180
1997	2.515
1990	1.227
1965	2.000

== Mayors of Gümerdiğin Municipality ==
Mayor, parties and percentage of votes
Year	Mayor	Party	Percentage of vote
2004	Ömer Avşaroğlu	AKP	%41,93
1999	Hüseyin Arıkanoğlu	DYP	
1994	Ömer Avşaroğlu	RP	%35.56
1989	Muzaffer Arıkanoğlu	DYP	%36.03
1984	Muzaffer Arıkanoğlu	DYP	%52.98
1977	Ömer Kurtoğlu		
1973	Abdullah Mülazımoğlu	CHP	%30.36
1968	Ömer Karaağaç	GP	%40.44
1967	Gani Bayramoğlu	AP	%60.52
