= Kızılibrik =

Kızılibrik can refer to:

- Kızılibrik, Atkaracalar
- Kızılibrik, Ilgaz
