= Kükürt =

Kükürt can refer to:

- Kükürt, Atkaracalar
- Kükürt, Yenipazar
