= Karahacı =

Karahacı can refer to:

- Karahacı, Şabanözü
- Karahacı, Silvan
