= Gürpınar, Şabanözü =

Village in Turkey

Gürpınar
- Neighbourhood
- Country: Turkey
- Province: Çankırı
- District: Şabanözü
- Municipality: Şabanözü
- Population (2021): 657
- Time zone: UTC+3 (TRT)

Gürpınar is a neighbourhood of the town Şabanözü, Şabanözü District, Çankırı Province, Turkey. Its population is 657 (2021). Before the 2013 reorganisation, it was a town (belde).
