= Yeniyapan =

Yeniyapan can refer to:

- Yeniyapan, Kızılırmak
- Yeniyapan, Uğurludağ
