= Akçaören =

Akçaören can refer to:

- Akçaören, Ilgaz
- Akçaören, Kazan
- Akçaören, Kemer
- Akçaören, Yığılca
