= Gaziler =

Gaziler may refer to:

- Gaziler, Ilgaz, a village in Çankırı Province, Turkey
- Gaziler, Kepez, a neighbourhood in Antalya Province, Turkey
- Gaziler, Manavgat, a neighbourhood in Antalya Province, Turkey
- Gaziler, Nizip, a village in Gaziantep Province, Turkey
- Gaziler, Şenkaya, a neighbourhood in Erzurum Province, Turkey
- Gaziler, Yığılca, a village in Düzce Province, Turkey
- Gaziler, Northern Cyprus or Pyrogi, an uninhabited village
