= Bugay =

Bugay is a surname. Notable people with the surname include:

- Amado Bugay (1954–1977), Filipino martyr and dissident against the Marcos dictatorship
- Nikolay Bugay (born 1941), Russian historian
- Ryley Bugay (born 1996), American-born Filipino footballer
- Saim Bugay (1934–2008), Turkish sculptor

== See also ==
- Buğay, Korgun
- Buğay, Yapraklı
- Bugay in Mole National Park, Ghana
