= Halaçlı =

Halaçlı can refer to:

- Halaçlı, Kastamonu
- Halaçlı, Kızılırmak
