= Serçeler =

Serçeler can refer to:

- Serçeler, Bismil
- Serçeler, Ilgaz
