= Gökçeyazı =

Gökçeyazı can refer to:

- Gökçeyazı, Ilgaz
- Gökçeyazı, Kaş
