= Seydiköy =

Seydiköy can refer to:

- Seydiköy, Eldivan
- Seydiköy, Keşan
- Seydiköy, Kütahya, a village in the Merkez (Central) district of Kütahya Province, Turkey
- Seydiköy, former name of Gaziemir, İzmir Province, Turkey
