= Gürpınar =

Gürpınar may refer to:

== Places ==
- Gürpınar, Van, a district and municipality in Van Province
- Gürpınar, Alaplı, a village in Zonguldak Province
- Gürpınar, Bartın, a village in Bartın Province
- Gürpınar, Çivril, a neighbourhood in Denizli Province
- Gürpınar, Göynük, a village in Bolu Province
- Gürpınar, Kozluk, a village in Batman Province
- Gürpınar, Şabanözü, a neighbourhood in Çankırı Province
- Gürpınar, Silvan, a neighbourhood in Diyarbakır Province
- Agia Marina (Skylloura), village in Cyprus, Gürpınar in Turkish

== People ==
- Ates Gürpinar (born 1984), German politician
- Burak Gürpınar (born 1975), Turkish drummer
- Doğan Gürpınar, Turkish historian
- Hüseyin Rahmi Gürpınar (1864–1944), Turkish writer
- İrfan Gürpınar (1943–2020), Turkish politician
