= Göldağı =

Göldağı can refer to:

- Göldağı, Gölpazarı
- Göldağı, Şabanözü
