= Bakırlı =

Bakırlı can refer to the following villages in Turkey:

- Bakırlı, Bolu
- Bakırlı, Gönen
- Bakırlı, Şabanözü
- Bakırlı, Seben
