= Seki, Ilgaz =

Village in Turkey

Seki
- Village
- Location in Turkey Seki (Turkey Central Anatolia)
- Coordinates: 40.9725°N 33.5544°E
- Country: Turkey
- Province: Çankırı
- District: Ilgaz
- Population (2022): 65
- Time zone: UTC+3 (TRT)

Seki is a village in Ilgaz District, Çankırı Province, Turkey. Its population is 65 (2022). It is 63 km from Çankırı and 10 km from Ilgaz town.

== Population ==
Historical population
Year	Pop.	±% p.a.
1997	101	—
2007	27	−12.36%
2012	46	+11.24%
2017	63	+6.49%
2022	65	+0.63%
Source: 1997 census and TÜIK (2007–2022)
