= Cömert =

Cömert is a Turkish word meaning "generous" and may refer to:

== Surname ==
- Ahmet Cömert (1926–1990), Turkish amateur boxer, coach, referee, boxing judge and sports official
- Eray Cömert (born 1998), Swiss professional footballer
- Faruk Cömert (born 1946), Turkish Air Force general

== Other uses ==
- Cömert, Ilgaz
- Ahmet Cömert Sport Hall, a multi-purpose sports venue in Bakırköy, Istanbul
