= Hüyükköy =

Hüyükköy can refer to:

- Hüyükköy, Atkaracalar
- Hüyükköy, Baskil
- Hüyükköy, Orta
