= Satılar =

Satılar can refer to:

- Satılar, Ilgaz
- Satılar, Koçarlı
