= Çapar =

Çapar may refer to:

- Çapar, Göynük, Bolu Province, Turkey
- Çapar, Şabanözü
- Serpil Çapar (born 1981), Turkish handball player
