= Keseköy, Ilgaz =

Village in Turkey

Keseköy
- Village
- Location in Turkey Keseköy (Turkey Central Anatolia)
- Coordinates: 40°56′57″N 33°37′21″E
- Country: Turkey
- Province: Çankırı
- District: Ilgaz
- Population (2021): 96
- Time zone: UTC+3 (TRT)

Keseköy is a village in the Ilgaz District of Çankırı Province in Turkey. Its population is 96 (2021).
