= Çatak, Ilgaz =

Village in Turkey

Çatak
- Village
- Location in Turkey Çatak (Turkey Central Anatolia)
- Coordinates: 41.0144°N 33.4369°E
- Country: Turkey
- Province: Çankırı
- District: Ilgaz
- Population (2021): 180
- Time zone: UTC+3 (TRT)

Çatak is a village in the Ilgaz District of Çankırı Province in Turkey. Its population is 180 (2021).
