= Bozatlı, Ilgaz =

Village in Turkey

Bozatlı
- Village
- Location in Turkey Bozatlı (Turkey Central Anatolia)
- Coordinates: 40.9731°N 33.6623°E
- Country: Turkey
- Province: Çankırı
- District: Ilgaz
- Population (2021): 42
- Time zone: UTC+3 (TRT)

Bozatlı is a village in the Ilgaz District of Çankırı Province in Turkey. Its population is 42 (2021).
