= Tepealagöz, Kızılırmak =

Village in Turkey

Tepealagöz
- Village
- Location in Turkey Tepealagöz (Turkey Central Anatolia)
- Coordinates: 40°22′N 33°58′E
- Country: Turkey
- Province: Çankırı
- District: Kızılırmak
- Population (2021): 191
- Time zone: UTC+3 (TRT)

Tepealagöz is a village in the Kızılırmak District of Çankırı Province in Turkey. Its population is 191 (2021).
