= Ömerli, Ilgaz =

Village in Turkey

Ömerli
- Village
- Country: Turkey
- Province: Çankırı
- District: Ilgaz
- Population (2021): 118
- Time zone: UTC+3 (TRT)

Ömerli is a village in the Ilgaz District of Çankırı Province in Turkey. Its population is 118 (2021).
