= Kahyalı, Kızılırmak =

Village in Turkey

Kahyalı
- Village
- Location in Turkey Kahyalı (Turkey Central Anatolia)
- Coordinates: 40.2986°N 33.8397°E
- Country: Turkey
- Province: Çankırı
- District: Kızılırmak
- Population (2021): 209
- Time zone: UTC+3 (TRT)

Kahyalı is a village in the Kızılırmak District of Çankırı Province in Turkey. Its population is 209 (2021).
