= Mülayimyenice, Ilgaz =

Village in Turkey

Mülayimyenice
- Village
- Location in Turkey Mülayimyenice (Turkey Central Anatolia)
- Coordinates: 41°01′40″N 33°42′57″E
- Country: Turkey
- Province: Çankırı
- District: Ilgaz
- Population (2021): 45
- Time zone: UTC+3 (TRT)

Mülayimyenice is a village in the Ilgaz District of Çankırı Province in Turkey. Its population is 45 (2021).
