= Çardaklı, Atkaracalar =

Village in Turkey

Çardaklı
- Municipality
- Location in Turkey Çardaklı (Turkey Central Anatolia)
- Coordinates: 40.8061°N 33.1283°E
- Country: Turkey
- Province: Çankırı
- District: Atkaracalar
- Population (2021): 2,079
- Time zone: UTC+3 (TRT)

Çardaklı is a town (belde) in the Atkaracalar District, Çankırı Province, Turkey. Its population is 2,079 (2021). The town consists of 5 quarters: Bozkuş, Cumhuriyet, Nevzatayaz, Hürriyet and Mustafakemal.
