= Eyüpözü, Atkaracalar =

Village in Turkey

Eyüpözü
- Village
- Location in Turkey Eyüpözü (Turkey Central Anatolia)
- Coordinates: 40°54′N 33°06′E
- Country: Turkey
- Province: Çankırı
- District: Atkaracalar
- Population (2021): 75
- Time zone: UTC+3 (TRT)

Eyüpözü is a village in the Atkaracalar District of Çankırı Province in Turkey. Its population is 75 (2021).
