= Korgun District =

District of Çankırı Province, Turkey

- District
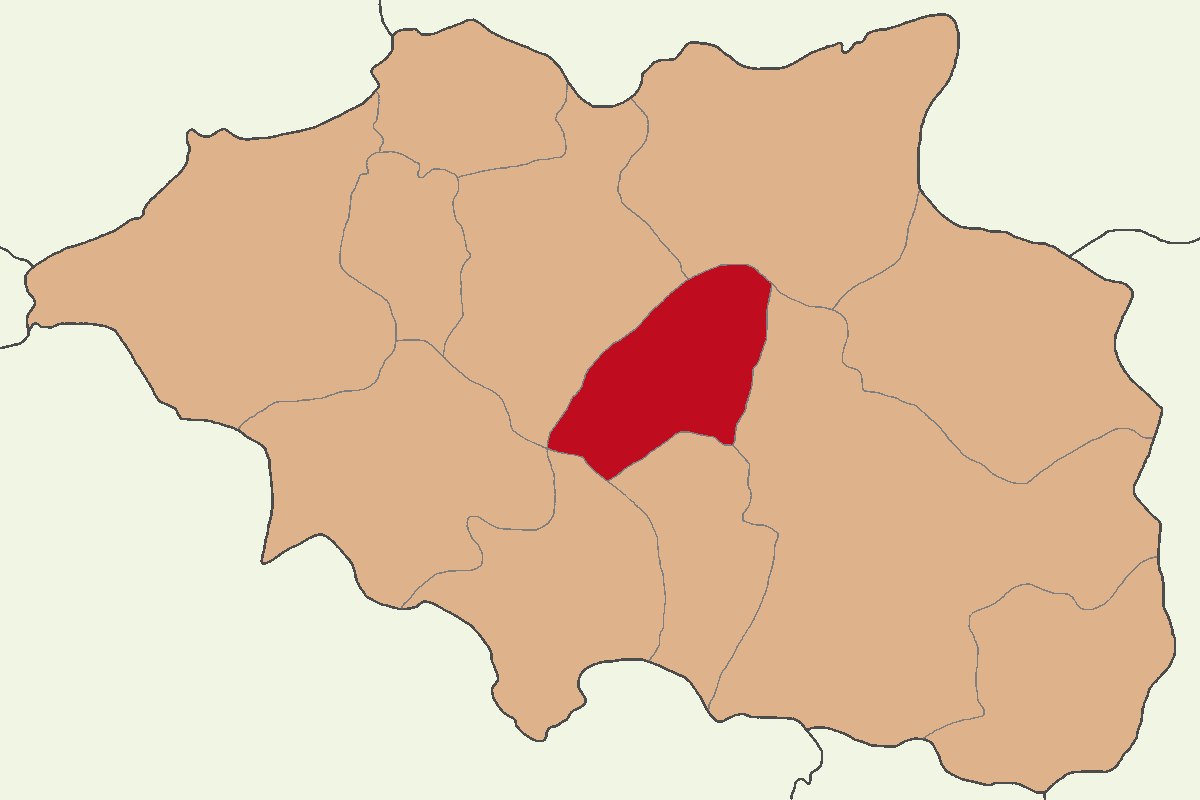
- Map showing Korgun District in Çankırı Province

- Location in Turkey Korgun District (Turkey Central Anatolia)
- Coordinates: 40°44′N 33°31′E
- Country: Turkey
- Province: Çankırı
- Seat: Korgun

Government
  - Kaymakam: Durdu Yavuz Öğüt
- Area: 378 km^{2} (146 sq mi)
- Population (2021): 4,569
  - Density: 12/km^{2} (31/sq mi)
- Time zone: UTC+3 (TRT)
- Website: www.korgun.gov.tr

Korgun District is a district of the Çankırı Province of Turkey. Its seat is the town of Korgun. Its area is 378 km^{2}, and its population is 4,569 (2021).

== Composition ==
There is one municipality in Korgun District:

- Korgun

There are 12 villages in Korgun District:

- Alpsarı
- Buğay
- Çukurören
- Dikenli
- Hıcıp
- İkiçam
- Ildızım
- Karatekin
- Kayıçivi
- Kesecik
- Maruf
- Şıhlar
