= Karallı, Kızılırmak =

Village in Turkey

Karallı
- Village
- Country: Turkey
- Province: Çankırı
- District: Kızılırmak
- Population (2021): 320
- Time zone: UTC+3 (TRT)

Karallı is a village in the Kızılırmak District of Çankırı Province in Turkey. Its population is 320 (2021).
