= Kesecik, Korgun =

Village in Turkey

Kesecik
- Village
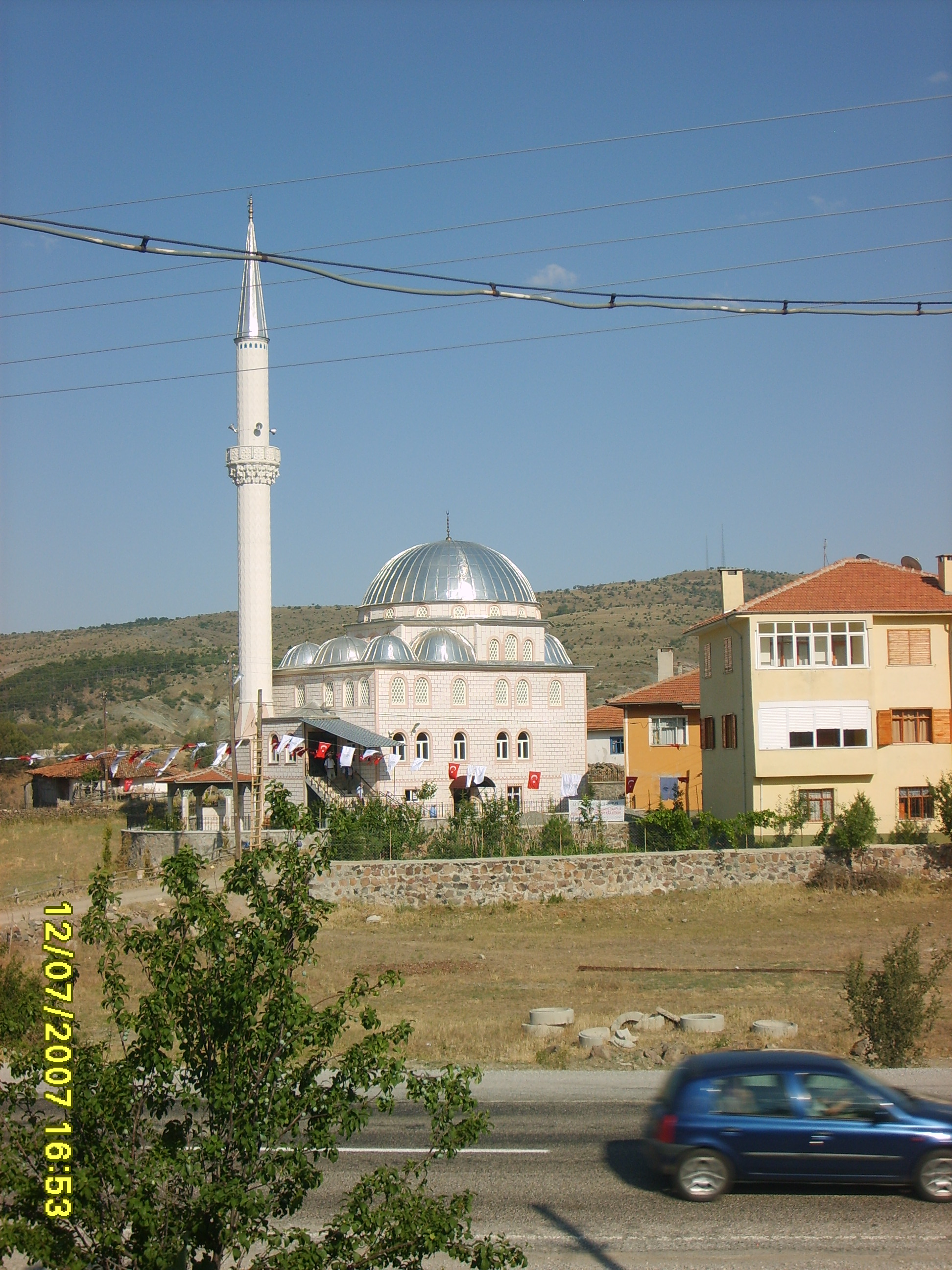

- Location within Turkey Location within Turkey Central Anatolia
- Country: Turkey
- Province: Çankırı
- District: Korgun
- Population (2021): 66
- Time zone: UTC+3 (TRT)

Kesecik is a village in the Korgun District of Çankırı Province in Turkey. Its population is 66 (2021).
