= Mesutören, Ilgaz =

Village in Turkey

Mesutören
- Village
- Location in Turkey Mesutören (Turkey Central Anatolia)
- Coordinates: 40°49′34″N 33°34′30″E
- Country: Turkey
- Province: Çankırı
- District: Ilgaz
- Population (2021): 27
- Time zone: UTC+3 (TRT)

Mesutören is a village in the Ilgaz District of Çankırı Province in Turkey. Its population is 27 (2021).
