= Bulduk, Şabanözü =

Village in Turkey

Bulduk
- Village
- Location in Turkey Bulduk (Turkey Central Anatolia)
- Coordinates: 40.5399°N 33.2036°E
- Country: Turkey
- Province: Çankırı
- District: Şabanözü
- Population (2021): 87
- Time zone: UTC+3 (TRT)

Bulduk is a village in the Şabanözü District of Çankırı Province in Turkey. Its population is 87 (2021).
