= Korgun =

- Municipality
- Location in Turkey Korgun (Turkey Central Anatolia)
- Coordinates: 40°44′N 33°31′E
- Country: Turkey
- Province: Çankırı
- District: Korgun

Government
  - Mayor: Hasan Hüseyin Kozan (MHP)
- Elevation: 910 m (2,990 ft)
- Population (2021): 2,619
- Time zone: UTC+3 (TRT)
- Area code: 0376
- Website: www.korgun.bel.tr

Korgun is a town in Çankırı Province in the Central Anatolia region of Turkey. It is the seat of Korgun District. Its population is 2,619 (2021).
