= Ericek, Ilgaz =

Village in Turkey

Ericek
- Village
- Location in Turkey Ericek (Turkey Central Anatolia)
- Coordinates: 40.829444°N 33.555556°E
- Country: Turkey
- Province: Çankırı
- District: Ilgaz
- Population (2021): 54
- Time zone: UTC+3 (TRT)

Ericek is a village in the Ilgaz District of Çankırı Province in Turkey. Its population is 54 (2021).
