= Şeyhyunus, Ilgaz =

Village in Turkey

Şeyhyunus
- Village
- Location in Turkey Şeyhyunus (Turkey Central Anatolia)
- Coordinates: 40°50′23″N 33°31′33″E
- Country: Turkey
- Province: Çankırı
- District: Ilgaz
- Population (2021): 75
- Time zone: UTC+3 (TRT)

Şeyhyunus is a village in the Ilgaz District of Çankırı Province in Turkey. Its population is 75 (2021).
