= Akçalı, Eldivan =

Village in Turkey

Akçalı
- Village
- Location in Turkey Akçalı (Turkey Central Anatolia)
- Coordinates: 40.6149°N 33.4669°E
- Country: Turkey
- Province: Çankırı
- District: Eldivan
- Population (2021): 117
- Time zone: UTC+3 (TRT)

Akçalı is a village in the Eldivan District of Çankırı Province in Turkey. Its population is 117 (2021).
