= Bükçük, Ilgaz =

Village in Turkey

Bükçük
- Village
- Location in Turkey Bükçük (Turkey Central Anatolia)
- Coordinates: 40°55′55″N 33°39′44″E
- Country: Turkey
- Province: Çankırı
- District: Ilgaz
- Population (2021): 66
- Time zone: UTC+3 (TRT)

Bükçük is a village in the Ilgaz District of Çankırı Province in Turkey. Its population is 66 (2021).
