= Yaylaören, Ilgaz =

Village in Turkey

Yaylaören
- Village
- Location in Turkey Yaylaören (Turkey Central Anatolia)
- Coordinates: 40°54′N 33°30′E
- Country: Turkey
- Province: Çankırı
- District: Ilgaz
- Population (2021): 115
- Time zone: UTC+3 (TRT)

Yaylaören is a village in the Ilgaz District of Çankırı Province in Turkey. Its population is 115 (2021).
