= Ödek, Şabanözü =

Village in Turkey

Ödek
- Village
- Country: Turkey
- Province: Çankırı
- District: Şabanözü
- Population (2021): 122
- Time zone: UTC+3 (TRT)

Ödek is a village in the Şabanözü District of Çankırı Province in Turkey. Its population is 122 (2021).
