= Ilgaz District =

District of Çankırı Province, Turkey

- District
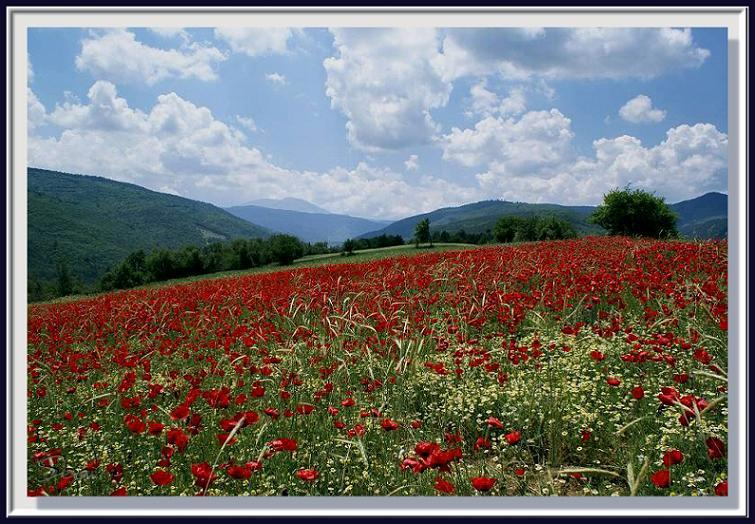
- Poppy fields near Mount Ilgaz

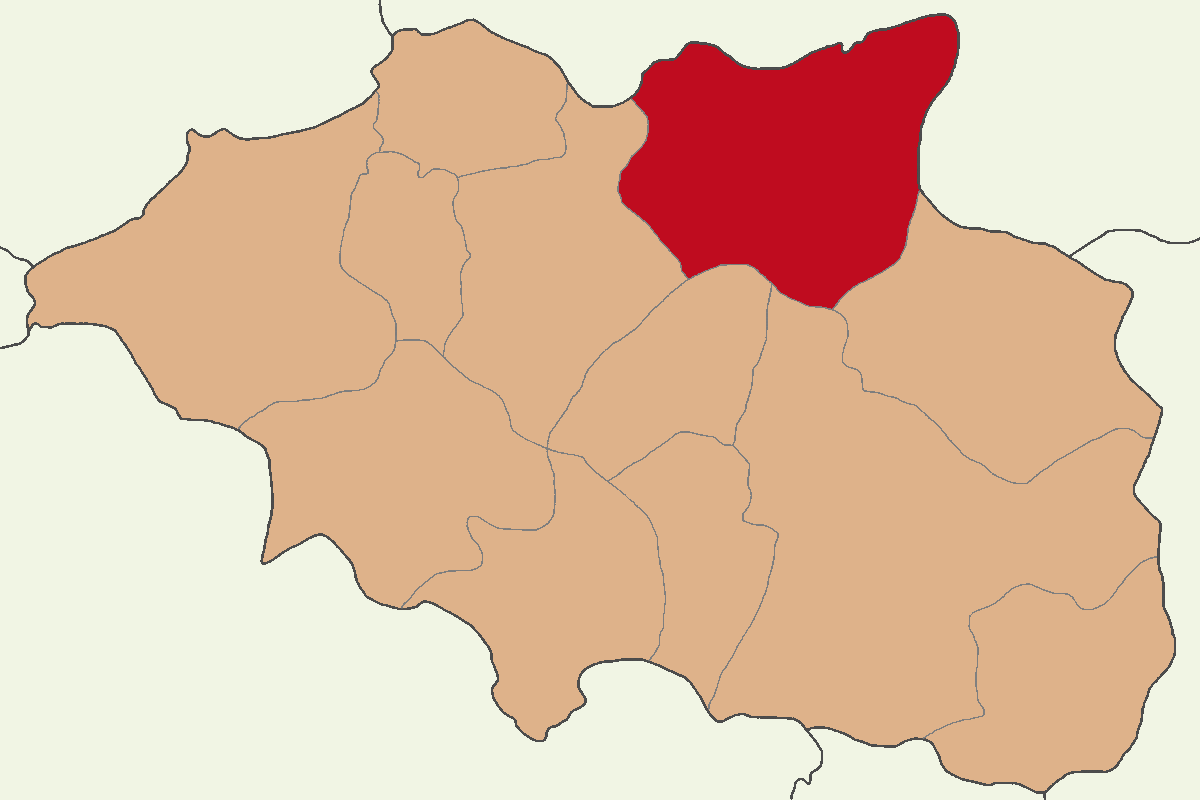
- Map showing Ilgaz District in Çankırı Province

- Location within Turkey Location within Turkey Central Anatolia
- Coordinates: 40°55′N 33°37′E
- Country: Turkey
- Province: Çankırı
- Seat: Ilgaz

Government
  - Kaymakam: Zübeyir Yıldırım
- Area: 845 km^{2} (326 sq mi)
- Population (2021): 13,700
  - Density: 16.2/km^{2} (42.0/sq mi)
- Time zone: UTC+3 (TRT)
- Website: www.ilgaz.gov.tr

Ilgaz District is a district of the Çankırı Province of Turkey. Its seat is the town of Ilgaz. Its area is 845 km^{2}, and its population is 13,700 (2021).

== Composition ==
There is one municipality in Ilgaz District:

- Ilgaz

There are 75 villages in Ilgaz District:

- Akçaören
- Aktaş
- Alıç
- Alibey
- Alpagut
- Arpayeri
- Aşağıbozan
- Aşağıdere
- Aşağımeydan
- Aşıklar
- Balcı
- Başdibek
- Belören
- Belsöğüt
- Beyköy
- Bozatlı
- Bucura Yenice
- Bükçük
- Çaltıpınar
- Candere
- Çatak
- Çeltikbaşı
- Cömert
- Çörekçiler
- Danişment
- Eksik
- Ericek
- Eskice
- Gaziler
- Gökçeyazı
- Güneyköy
- Hacıhasan
- İkikavak
- Ilısılık
- İnköy
- Kaleköy
- Kavaklı
- Kayı
- Kazancı
- Keseköy
- Kırışlar
- Kıyısın
- Kızılibrik
- Kurmalar
- Kuşçayırı
- Kuyupınar
- Mesutören
- Musaköy
- Mülayim
- Mülayimyenice
- Ödemiş
- Okçular
- Ömerli
- Onaç
- Sağırlar
- Saraycık
- Sarmaşık
- Satılar
- Sazak
- Seki
- Serçeler
- Şeyhyunus
- Söğütcük
- Süleymanhacılar
- Yalaycık
- Yaylaören
- Yazıköy
- Yenidemirciler
- Yerkuyu
- Yeşildumlupınar
- Yukarıbozan
- Yukarıdere
- Yukarımeydan
- Yuvademirciler
- Yuvasaray
