= Hisarcık, Eldivan =

Village in Turkey

Hisarcık
- Village
- Country: Turkey
- Province: Çankırı
- District: Eldivan
- Population (2021): 95
- Time zone: UTC+3 (TRT)

Hisarcık is a village in the Eldivan District of Çankırı Province in Turkey. Its population is 95 (2021).
