= Çukurören, Korgun =

Village in Turkey

Çukurören
- Village
- Location in Turkey Çukurören (Turkey Central Anatolia)
- Coordinates: 40.663°N 33.401°E
- Country: Turkey
- Province: Çankırı
- District: Korgun
- Population (2021): 145
- Time zone: UTC+3 (TRT)

Çukurören is a village in the Korgun District of Çankırı Province in Turkey. Its population is 145 (2021).
