= Ödemiş, Ilgaz =

Village in Turkey

Ödemiş
- Village
- Location in Turkey Ödemiş (Turkey Central Anatolia)
- Coordinates: 40.948056°N 33.553889°E
- Country: Turkey
- Province: Çankırı
- District: Ilgaz
- Population (2021): 49
- Time zone: UTC+3 (TRT)

Ödemiş is a village in the Ilgaz District of Çankırı Province in Turkey. Its population is 49 (2021).

== Notable people ==
- Ekin-Su Cülcüloğlu, winner of the 8th season of Love Island
