= Yazıköy, Ilgaz =

Village in Turkey

Yazıköy
- Village
- Country: Turkey
- Province: Çankırı
- District: Ilgaz
- Population (2021): 36
- Time zone: UTC+3 (TRT)

Yazıköy is a village in the Ilgaz District of Çankırı Province in Turkey. Its population is 36 (2021).
