= Bayanpınar, Kızılırmak =

Village in Turkey

Bayanpınar
- Village
- Location in Turkey Bayanpınar (Turkey Central Anatolia)
- Coordinates: 40°27′N 34°00′E
- Country: Turkey
- Province: Çankırı
- District: Kızılırmak
- Population (2021): 46
- Time zone: UTC+3 (TRT)

Bayanpınar is a village in the Kızılırmak District of Çankırı Province in Turkey. Its population is 46 (2021). The village is populated by Kurds.
