= Danişment, Ilgaz =

Village in Turkey

Danişment
- Village
- Country: Turkey
- Province: Çankırı
- District: Ilgaz
- Population (2021): 33
- Time zone: UTC+3 (TRT)

Danişment is a village in the Ilgaz District of Çankırı Province in Turkey. Its population is 33 (2021).
