= Yerkuyu, Ilgaz =

Village in Turkey

Yerkuyu
- Village
- Location in Turkey Yerkuyu (Turkey Central Anatolia)
- Coordinates: 40°54′09″N 33°43′21″E
- Country: Turkey
- Province: Çankırı
- District: Ilgaz
- Population (2021): 133
- Time zone: UTC+3 (TRT)

Yerkuyu is a village in the Ilgaz District of Çankırı Province in Turkey. Its population is 133 (2021).
