= Söğütcük, Ilgaz =

Village in Turkey

Söğütcük
- Village
- Location in Turkey Söğütcük (Turkey Central Anatolia)
- Coordinates: 40.884722°N 33.400278°E
- Country: Turkey
- Province: Çankırı
- District: Ilgaz
- Population (2021): 30
- Time zone: UTC+3 (TRT)

Söğütcük is a village in the Ilgaz District of Çankırı Province in Turkey. Its population is 30 (2021).
