= Musaköy, Ilgaz =

Village in Turkey

Musaköy
- Village
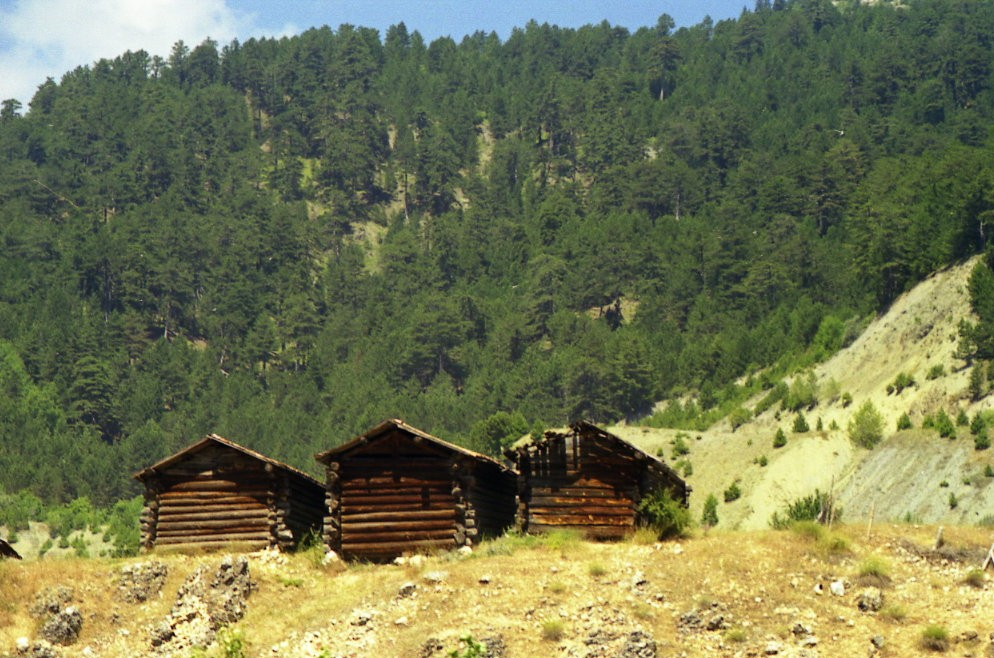
- Musaköy, Yayla Houses, Ilgaz

- Location within Turkey Location within Turkey Central Anatolia
- Country: Turkey
- Province: Çankırı
- District: Ilgaz
- Population (2021): 46
- Time zone: UTC+3 (TRT)

Musaköy is a village in the Ilgaz District of Çankırı Province in Turkey. In 2021, it had a population of 46.
