= Alibey, Ilgaz =

Village in Turkey

Alibey
- Village
- Location in Turkey Alibey (Turkey Central Anatolia)
- Coordinates: 40.9582°N 33.5166°E
- Country: Turkey
- Province: Çankırı
- District: Ilgaz
- Population (2021): 54
- Time zone: UTC+3 (TRT)

Alibey is a village in the Ilgaz District of Çankırı Province in Turkey. Its population is 54 (2021).
