= Bulgurcu, Şabanözü =

Village in Turkey

Bulgurcu
- Village
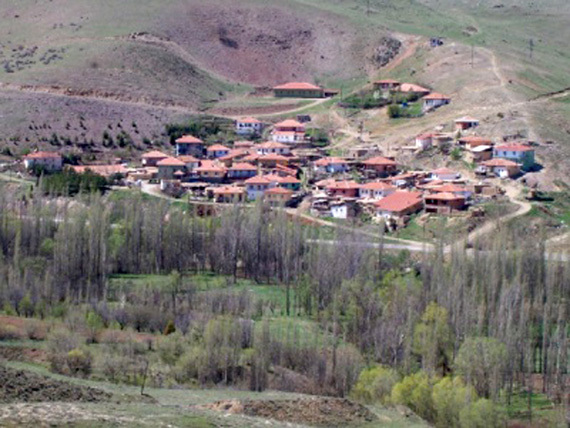

- Location within Turkey Location within Turkey Central Anatolia
- Coordinates: 40°25′N 33°16′E
- Country: Turkey
- Province: Çankırı
- District: Şabanözü
- Population (2021): 101
- Time zone: UTC+3 (TRT)

Bulgurcu is a village in the Şabanözü District of Çankırı Province in Turkey. Its population is 101 (2021).
