= Bostanlı, Kızılırmak =

Village in Turkey

Bostanlı
- Village
- Location in Turkey Bostanlı (Turkey Central Anatolia)
- Coordinates: 40.3299°N 33.8175°E
- Country: Turkey
- Province: Çankırı
- District: Kızılırmak
- Population (2021): 129
- Time zone: UTC+3 (TRT)

Bostanlı is a village in the Kızılırmak District of Çankırı Province in Turkey. Its population is 129 (2021).
