= Çörekçiler, Ilgaz =

Village in Turkey

Çörekçiler
- Village
- Location in Turkey Çörekçiler (Turkey Central Anatolia)
- Coordinates: 40°51′N 33°28′E
- Country: Turkey
- Province: Çankırı
- District: Ilgaz
- Population (2021): 236
- Time zone: UTC+3 (TRT)

Çörekçiler is a village in the Ilgaz District of Çankırı Province in Turkey. Its population is 236 (2021).
