= Arpayeri, Ilgaz =

Village in Turkey

Arpayeri
- Village
- Location in Turkey Arpayeri (Turkey Central Anatolia)
- Coordinates: 40°58′N 33°44′E
- Country: Turkey
- Province: Çankırı
- District: Ilgaz
- Population (2021): 46
- Time zone: UTC+3 (TRT)

Arpayeri is a village in the Ilgaz District of Çankırı Province in Turkey. Its population is 46 (2021).
