= Özbek, Şabanözü =

Village in Turkey

Özbek
- Village
- Location in Turkey Özbek (Turkey Central Anatolia)
- Coordinates: 40.3690°N 33.2400°E
- Country: Turkey
- Province: Çankırı
- District: Şabanözü
- Population (2021): 121
- Time zone: UTC+3 (TRT)

Özbek is a village in the Şabanözü District of Çankırı Province in Turkey. Its population is 121 (2021).
