= Büyükhacıbey, Eldivan =

Village in Turkey

Büyükhacıbey
- Village
- Location in Turkey Büyükhacıbey (Turkey Central Anatolia)
- Coordinates: 40°26′N 33°30′E
- Country: Turkey
- Province: Çankırı
- District: Eldivan
- Population (2021): 212
- Time zone: UTC+3 (TRT)

Büyükhacıbey is a village in the Eldivan District of Çankırı Province in Turkey. Its population is 212 (2021).
