= Aşağıdere, Ilgaz =

Village in Turkey

Aşağıdere
- Village
- Location in Turkey Aşağıdere (Turkey Central Anatolia)
- Coordinates: 40.9527°N 33.6314°E
- Country: Turkey
- Province: Çankırı
- District: Ilgaz
- Population (2021): 30
- Time zone: UTC+3 (TRT)

Aşağıdere is a village in the Ilgaz District of Çankırı Province in Turkey. Its population is 30 (2021).
