= Yukarımeydan, Ilgaz =

Village in Turkey

Yukarımeydan
- Village
- Location in Turkey Yukarımeydan (Turkey Central Anatolia)
- Coordinates: 40.971°N 33.651°E
- Country: Turkey
- Province: Çankırı
- District: Ilgaz
- Population (2021): 23
- Time zone: UTC+3 (TRT)

Yukarımeydan is a village in the Ilgaz District of Çankırı Province in Turkey. Its population is 23 (2021).
