= Hacıhasan, Ilgaz =

Village in Turkey

Hacıhasan
- Village
- Location in Turkey Hacıhasan (Turkey Central Anatolia)
- Coordinates: 40.91770°N 33.67466°E
- Country: Turkey
- Province: Çankırı
- District: Ilgaz
- Population (2021): 195
- Time zone: UTC+3 (TRT)

Hacıhasan is a village in the Ilgaz District of Çankırı Province in Turkey. Its population is 195 (2021).
