= Sazak, Ilgaz =

Village in Turkey

Sazak
- Village
- Location within Turkey Location within Turkey Central Anatolia
- Country: Turkey
- Province: Çankırı
- District: Ilgaz
- Population (2021): 39
- Time zone: UTC+3 (TRT)

Sazak is a village in the Ilgaz District of Çankırı Province in Turkey. Its population is 39 (2021).
