= Kırışlar, Ilgaz =

Village in Turkey

Kırışlar
- Village
- Location in Turkey Kırışlar (Turkey Central Anatolia)
- Coordinates: 40°56′N 33°29′E
- Country: Turkey
- Province: Çankırı
- District: Ilgaz
- Population (2021): 122
- Time zone: UTC+3 (TRT)

Kırışlar is a village in the Ilgaz District of Çankırı Province in Turkey. Its population is 122 (2021).
