= Kızılırmak District =

District of Çankırı Province, Turkey

- District
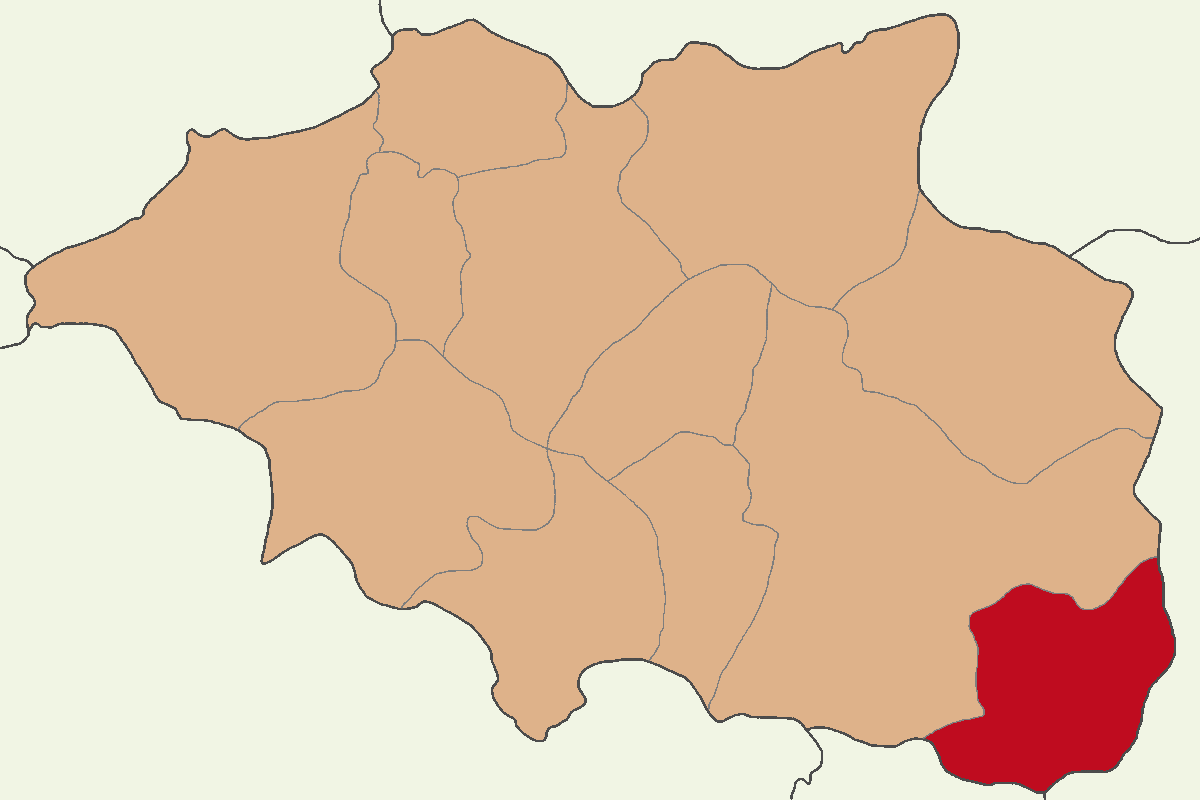
- Map showing Kızılırmak District in Çankırı Province

- Location in Turkey Kızılırmak District (Turkey Central Anatolia)
- Coordinates: 40°20′N 33°59′E
- Country: Turkey
- Province: Çankırı
- Seat: Kızılırmak

Government
  - Kaymakam: Abdurrahim Tomakin
- Area: 514 km^{2} (198 sq mi)
- Population (2021): 7,122
  - Density: 14/km^{2} (36/sq mi)
- Time zone: UTC+3 (TRT)
- Website: www.kizilirmak.gov.tr

Kızılırmak District is a district of the Çankırı Province of Turkey. Its seat is the town of Kızılırmak. Its area is 514 km^{2}, and its population is 7,122 (2021).

== Composition ==
There is one municipality in Kızılırmak District:

- Kızılırmak

There are 26 villages in Kızılırmak District:

- Aşağıalagöz
- Aşağıovacık
- Bayanpınar
- Bostanlı
- Boyacıoğlu
- Büyükbahçeli
- Cacıklar
- Güneykışla
- Hacılar
- Halaçlı
- Kahyalı
- Kapaklı
- Karadibek
- Karallı
- Karamürsel
- Karaömer
- Kavlaklı
- Kemallı
- Korçullu
- Kuzeykışla
- Sakarca
- Saraycık
- Tepealagöz
- Tımarlı
- Yeniyapan
- Yukarıalagöz
