= Yuvasaray, Ilgaz =

Village in Turkey

Yuvasaray
- Village
- Location in Turkey Yuvasaray (Turkey Central Anatolia)
- Coordinates: 40°52′29″N 33°44′34″E
- Country: Turkey
- Province: Çankırı
- District: Ilgaz
- Population (2021): 251
- Time zone: UTC+3 (TRT)

Yuvasaray is a village in the Ilgaz District of Çankırı Province in Turkey. Its population is 251 (2021).
