= Küçükhacıbey, Eldivan =

Village in Turkey

Küçükhacıbey
- Village
- Location in Turkey Küçükhacıbey (Turkey Central Anatolia)
- Coordinates: 40°27′N 33°31′E
- Country: Turkey
- Province: Çankırı
- District: Eldivan
- Population (2021): 138
- Time zone: UTC+3 (TRT)

Küçükhacıbey is a village in the Eldivan District of Çankırı Province in Turkey. Its population is 138 (2021).
