= Yuvademirciler, Ilgaz =

Village in Turkey

Yuvademirciler
- Village
- Location in Turkey Yuvademirciler (Turkey Central Anatolia)
- Coordinates: 40°59′46″N 33°43′37″E
- Country: Turkey
- Province: Çankırı
- District: Ilgaz
- Population (2021): 79
- Time zone: UTC+3 (TRT)

Yuvademirciler is a village in the Ilgaz District of Çankırı Province in Turkey. Its population is 79 (2021).
