= Kutluşar, Şabanözü =

Village in Turkey

Kutluşar
- Village
- Location in Turkey Kutluşar (Turkey Central Anatolia)
- Coordinates: 40°24′N 33°14′E
- Country: Turkey
- Province: Çankırı
- District: Şabanözü
- Population (2021): 67
- Time zone: UTC+3 (TRT)

Kutluşar is a village in the Şabanözü District of Çankırı Province in Turkey. Its population is 67 (2021).
