= Belsöğüt, Ilgaz =

Village in Turkey

Belsöğüt
- Village
- Location in Turkey Belsöğüt (Turkey Central Anatolia)
- Coordinates: 40°56′51″N 33°36′04″E
- Country: Turkey
- Province: Çankırı
- District: Ilgaz
- Population (2021): 69
- Time zone: UTC+3 (TRT)

Belsöğüt is a village in the Ilgaz District of Çankırı Province in Turkey. Its population is 69 (2021).
