= Alpagut, Ilgaz =

Village in Turkey

Alpagut
- Village
- Location in Turkey Alpagut (Turkey Central Anatolia)
- Coordinates: 40.9194°N 33.5415°E
- Country: Turkey
- Province: Çankırı
- District: Ilgaz
- Population (2021): 57
- Time zone: UTC+3 (TRT)

Alpagut is a village in the Ilgaz District of Çankırı Province in Turkey. Its population is 57 (2021).
