= Kaleköy, Ilgaz =

Village in Turkey

Kaleköy
- Village
- Location in Turkey Kaleköy (Turkey Central Anatolia)
- Coordinates: 40.956389°N 33.653056°E
- Country: Turkey
- Province: Çankırı
- District: Ilgaz
- Population (2021): 94
- Time zone: UTC+3 (TRT)

Kaleköy (also: Kale) is a village in the Ilgaz District of Çankırı Province in Turkey. Its population is 94 (2021).
