= Aşağıovacık, Kızılırmak =

Village in Turkey

Aşağıovacık
- Village
- Location in Turkey Aşağıovacık (Turkey Central Anatolia)
- Coordinates: 40.4523°N 33.8739°E
- Country: Turkey
- Province: Çankırı
- District: Kızılırmak
- Population (2021): 100
- Time zone: UTC+3 (TRT)

Aşağıovacık is a village in the Kızılırmak District of Çankırı Province in Turkey. Its population is 100 (2021).
