= Gölez, Eldivan =

Village in Turkey

Gölez
- Village
- Location in Turkey Gölez (Turkey Central Anatolia)
- Coordinates: 40°30′N 33°33′E
- Country: Turkey
- Province: Çankırı
- District: Eldivan
- Population (2021): 144
- Time zone: UTC+3 (TRT)

Gölez is a village in the Eldivan District of Çankırı Province in Turkey. Its population is 144 (2021).
