= Kapaklı, Kızılırmak =

Village in Turkey

Kapaklı
- Village
- Country: Turkey
- Province: Çankırı
- District: Kızılırmak
- Population (2021): 49
- Time zone: UTC+3 (TRT)

Kapaklı is a village in the Kızılırmak District of Çankırı Province in Turkey. Its population is 49 (2021).
