= Mülayim, Ilgaz =

Village in Turkey

Mülayim
- Village
- Location in Turkey Mülayim (Turkey Central Anatolia)
- Coordinates: 41.0208°N 33.7063°E
- Country: Turkey
- Province: Çankırı
- District: Ilgaz
- Population (2021): 182
- Time zone: UTC+3 (TRT)

Mülayim is a village in the Ilgaz District of Çankırı Province in Turkey. Its population is 182 (2021).
