= Aşağıbozan, Ilgaz =

Village in Turkey

Aşağıbozan
- Village
- Location in Turkey Aşağıbozan (Turkey Central Anatolia)
- Coordinates: 40°57′N 33°36′E
- Country: Turkey
- Province: Çankırı
- District: Ilgaz
- Population (2021): 25
- Time zone: UTC+3 (TRT)

Aşağıbozan is a village in the Ilgaz District of Çankırı Province in Turkey. Its population is 25 (2021).
