= Yukarıalagöz, Kızılırmak =

Village in Turkey

Yukarıalagöz
- Village
- Location in Turkey Yukarıalagöz (Turkey Central Anatolia)
- Coordinates: 40.389°N 33.906°E
- Country: Turkey
- Province: Çankırı
- District: Kızılırmak
- Population (2021): 611
- Time zone: UTC+3 (TRT)

Yukarıalagöz is a village in the Kızılırmak District of Çankırı Province in Turkey. Its population is 611 (2021).
