= Belören, Ilgaz =

Village in Turkey

Belören
- Village
- Location in Turkey Belören (Turkey Central Anatolia)
- Coordinates: 40.8613°N 33.4955°E
- Country: Turkey
- Province: Çankırı
- District: Ilgaz
- Population (2021): 119
- Time zone: UTC+3 (TRT)

Belören is a village in the Ilgaz District of Çankırı Province in Turkey. Its population is 119 (2021).
