= Kavaklı, Ilgaz =

Village in Turkey

Kavaklı
- Village
- Location in Turkey Kavaklı (Turkey Central Anatolia)
- Coordinates: 40.885278°N 33.468889°E
- Country: Turkey
- Province: Çankırı
- District: Ilgaz
- Population (2021): 34
- Time zone: UTC+3 (TRT)

Kavaklı is a village in the Ilgaz District of Çankırı Province in Turkey. Its population is 34 (2021).
