= Hıcıp, Korgun =

Village in Turkey

Hıcıp
- Village
- Country: Turkey
- Province: Çankırı
- District: Korgun
- Population (2021): 206
- Time zone: UTC+3 (TRT)

Hıcıp is a village in the Korgun District of Çankırı Province in Turkey. Its population is 206 (2021).
