= Kayıçivi, Korgun =

Village in Turkey

Kayıçivi
- Village
- Location in Turkey Kayıçivi (Turkey Central Anatolia)
- Coordinates: 40°42′N 33°28′E
- Country: Turkey
- Province: Çankırı
- District: Korgun
- Population (2021): 154
- Time zone: UTC+3 (TRT)

Kayıçivi is a village in the Korgun District of Çankırı Province in Turkey. Its population is 154 (2021).
