= Akbulut, Eldivan =

Village in Turkey

Akbulut
- Village
- Location in Turkey Akbulut (Turkey Central Anatolia)
- Coordinates: 40°29′2″N 33°31′25″E
- Country: Turkey
- Province: Çankırı
- District: Eldivan
- Population (2021): 32
- Time zone: UTC+3 (TRT)

Akbulut is a village in the Eldivan District of Çankırı Province in Turkey. Its population is 32 (2021).
