= Kıyısın, Ilgaz =

Village in Turkey

Kıyısın
- Village
- Location in Turkey Kıyısın (Turkey Central Anatolia)
- Coordinates: 40°49′43″N 33°36′22″E
- Country: Turkey
- Province: Çankırı
- District: Ilgaz
- Population (2021): 104
- Time zone: UTC+3 (TRT)

Kıyısın is a village in the Ilgaz District of Çankırı Province in Turkey. Its population is 104 (2021).
