= Yukarıyanlar, Eldivan =

Village in Turkey

Yukarıyanlar
- Village
- Location in Turkey Yukarıyanlar (Turkey Central Anatolia)
- Coordinates: 40°34′28″N 33°31′46″E
- Country: Turkey
- Province: Çankırı
- District: Eldivan
- Population (2021): 105
- Time zone: UTC+3 (TRT)

Yukarıyanlar is a village in the Eldivan District of Çankırı Province in Turkey. Its population is 105 (2021).
