= Karakoçaş, Şabanözü =

Village in Çankırı, Turkey

Karakoçaş
- Village
- Location in Turkey Karakoçaş (Turkey Central Anatolia)
- Coordinates: 40°27′N 33°22′E
- Country: Turkey
- Province: Çankırı
- District: Şabanözü
- Population (2021): 105
- Time zone: UTC+3 (TRT)

Karakoçaş is a village in the Şabanözü District of Çankırı Province in Turkey. Its population is 105 (2021).
