= Hacılar, Kızılırmak =

Village in Turkey

Hacılar
- Village
- Location in Turkey Hacılar (Turkey Central Anatolia)
- Coordinates: 40.34183°N 33.87589°E
- Country: Turkey
- Province: Çankırı
- District: Kızılırmak
- Population (2021): 297
- Time zone: UTC+3 (TRT)

Hacılar is a village in the Kızılırmak District of Çankırı Province in Turkey. Its population is 297 (2021).
