= Yakalı, Atkaracalar =

Village in Turkey

Yakalı
- Village
- Country: Turkey
- Province: Çankırı
- District: Atkaracalar
- Population (2021): 68
- Time zone: UTC+3 (TRT)

Yakalı is a village in the Atkaracalar District of Çankırı Province in Turkey. Its population is 68 (2021).
