= Başdibek, Ilgaz =

Village in Turkey

Başdibek
- Village
- Location in Turkey Başdibek (Turkey Central Anatolia)
- Coordinates: 40°53′19″N 33°34′32″E
- Country: Turkey
- Province: Çankırı
- District: Ilgaz
- Population (2021): 120
- Time zone: UTC+3 (TRT)

Başdibek is a village in the Ilgaz District of Çankırı Province in Turkey. Its population is 120 (2021).
