= Elmacı, Eldivan =

Village in Turkey

Elmacı
- Village
- Country: Turkey
- Province: Çankırı
- District: Eldivan
- Population (2021): 204
- Time zone: UTC+3 (TRT)

Elmacı is a village in the Eldivan District of Çankırı Province in Turkey. Its population is 204 (2021).
