= Maccarae =

Town in ancient Thessaly

Coordinates: 39°12′26″N 22°27′33″E

Maccarae or Makkarai (Ancient Greek: Μακκάραι) was a town in ancient Thessaly in the territory of Pharsalus.

It is tentatively located near the modern Arabises.
