= Budakpınar, Atkaracalar =

Village in Turkey

Budakpınar
- Village
- Location in Turkey Budakpınar (Turkey Central Anatolia)
- Coordinates: 40°51′N 33°09′E
- Country: Turkey
- Province: Çankırı
- District: Atkaracalar
- Population (2021): 117
- Time zone: UTC+3 (TRT)

Budakpınar is a village in the Atkaracalar District of Çankırı Province in Turkey. Its population is 117 (2021).
