= Aşağıalagöz, Kızılırmak =

Village in Turkey

Aşağıalagöz
- Village
- Location in Turkey Aşağıalagöz (Turkey Central Anatolia)
- Coordinates: 40°22′N 33°57′E
- Country: Turkey
- Province: Çankırı
- District: Kızılırmak
- Population (2021): 239
- Time zone: UTC+3 (TRT)

Aşağıalagöz is a village in the Kızılırmak District of Çankırı Province in Turkey. Its population is 239 (2021).
