= Sağırlar, Ilgaz =

Village in Turkey

Sağırlar
- Village
- Location in Turkey Sağırlar (Turkey Central Anatolia)
- Coordinates: 40.8788°N 33.5438°E
- Country: Turkey
- Province: Çankırı
- District: Ilgaz
- Population (2021): 50
- Time zone: UTC+3 (TRT)

Sağırlar is a village in the Ilgaz District of Çankırı Province in Turkey. Its population is 50 (2021).
