= Çaparkayı, Şabanözü =

Village in Turkey

Çaparkayı
- Village
- Location in Turkey Çaparkayı (Turkey Central Anatolia)
- Coordinates: 40°31′N 33°21′E
- Country: Turkey
- Province: Çankırı
- District: Şabanözü
- Population (2021): 204
- Time zone: UTC+3 (TRT)

Çaparkayı is a village in the Şabanözü District of Çankırı Province in Turkey. Its population is 204 (2021).
