= Eksik, Ilgaz =

Village in Turkey

Eksik
- Village
- Location in Turkey Eksik (Turkey Central Anatolia)
- Coordinates: 41°01′N 33°41′E
- Country: Turkey
- Province: Çankırı
- District: Ilgaz
- Population (2021): 67
- Time zone: UTC+3 (TRT)

Eksik is a village in the Ilgaz District of Çankırı Province in Turkey. Its population is 67 (2021).
