= Büyükyakalı, Şabanözü =

Village in Turkey

Büyükyakalı
- Village
- Location in Turkey Büyükyakalı (Turkey Central Anatolia)
- Coordinates: 40°29′N 33°13′E
- Country: Turkey
- Province: Çankırı
- District: Şabanözü
- Population (2021): 421
- Time zone: UTC+3 (TRT)

Büyükyakalı is a village in the Şabanözü District of Çankırı Province in Turkey. Its population is 421 (2021).
