= Eldivan =

- Municipality
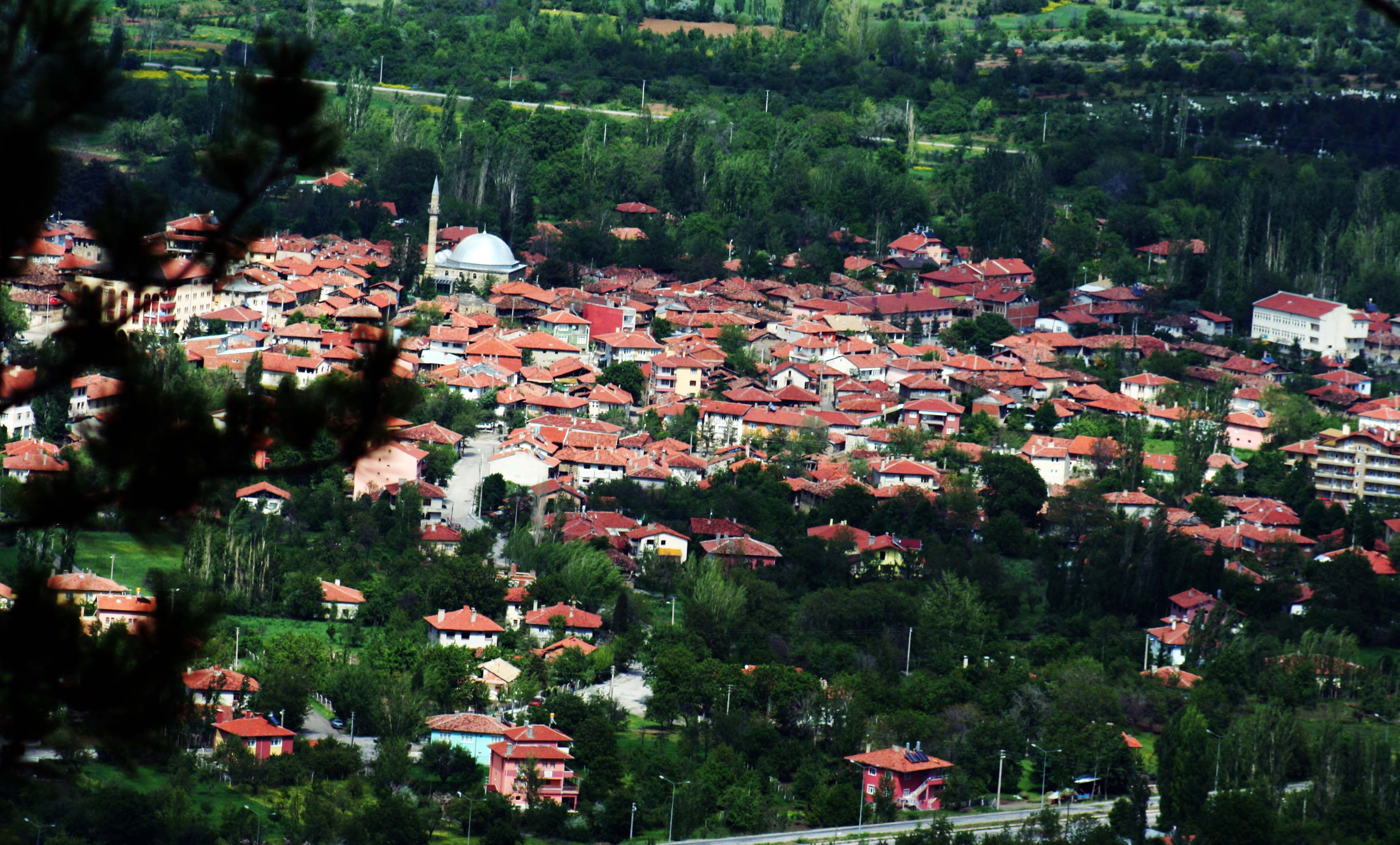

- Location within Turkey Location within Turkey Central Anatolia
- Coordinates: 40°31′48″N 33°29′56″E
- Country: Turkey
- Province: Çankırı
- District: Eldivan

Government
  - Mayor: Mustafa Lafcı (AKP)
- Elevation: 940 m (3,080 ft)
- Population (2021): 3,291
- Time zone: UTC+3 (TRT)
- Postal code: 18700
- Area code: 0376
- Website: eldivan.bel.tr

Eldivan is a town in Çankırı Province in the Central Anatolia region of Turkey. It is the seat of Eldivan District. Its population is 3,291 (2021).
