= Kurmalar, Ilgaz =

Village in Turkey

Kurmalar
- Village
- Location in Turkey Kurmalar (Turkey Central Anatolia)
- Coordinates: 40°59′15″N 33°43′29″E
- Country: Turkey
- Province: Çankırı
- District: Ilgaz
- Population (2021): 46
- Time zone: UTC+3 (TRT)

Kurmalar is a village in the Ilgaz District of Çankırı Province in Turkey. Its population is 46 (2021).
