= Maruf, Korgun =

Village in Turkey

Maruf
- Village
- Location in Turkey Maruf (Turkey Central Anatolia)
- Coordinates: 40°38′51″N 33°24′55″E
- Country: Turkey
- Province: Çankırı
- District: Korgun
- Population (2021): 540
- Time zone: UTC+3 (TRT)

Maruf is a village in the Korgun District of Çankırı Province in Turkey. Its population is 540 (2021).
