= Eldivan District =

District of Çankırı Province, Turkey

- District
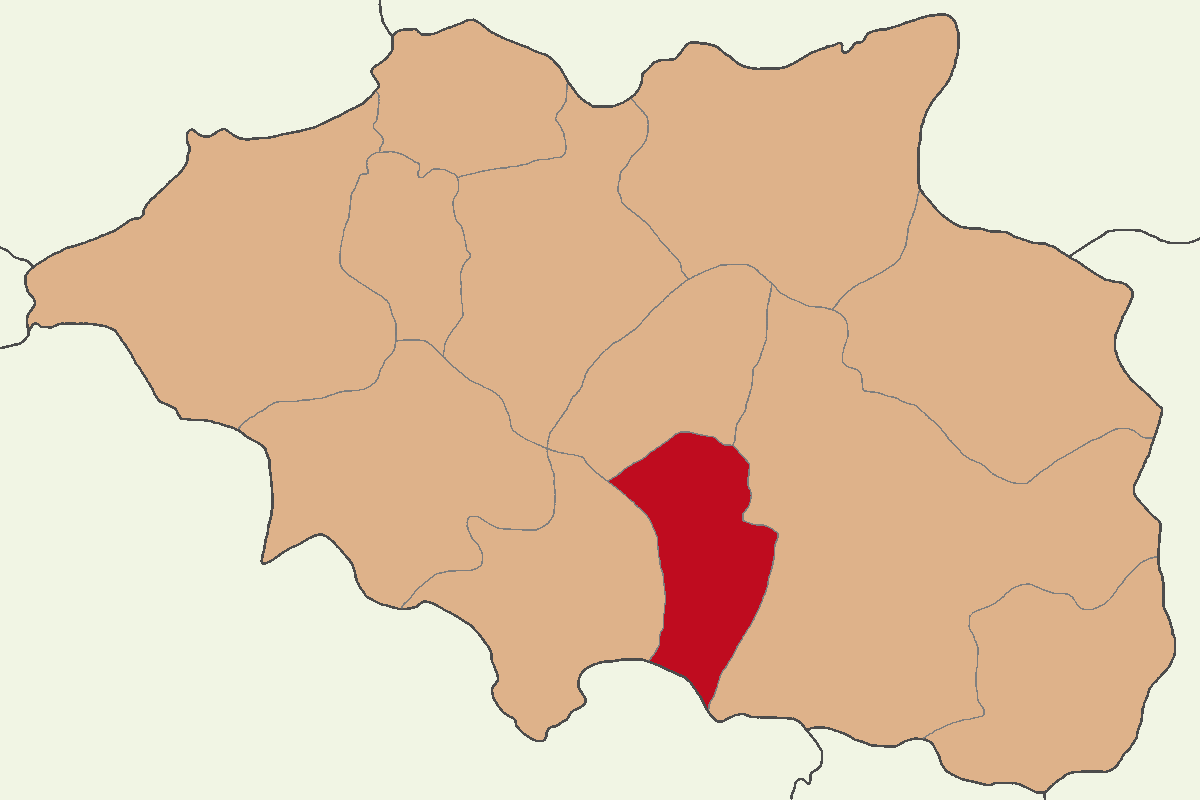
- Map showing Eldivan District in Çankırı Province

- Location in Turkey Eldivan District (Turkey Central Anatolia)
- Coordinates: 40°32′N 33°30′E
- Country: Turkey
- Province: Çankırı
- Seat: Eldivan

Government
  - Kaymakam: Merve Ayşe Büyükuçar
- Area: 350 km^{2} (140 sq mi)
- Population (2021): 5,977
  - Density: 17/km^{2} (44/sq mi)
- Time zone: UTC+3 (TRT)
- Website: www.eldivan.gov.tr

Eldivan District is a district of the Çankırı Province of Turkey. Its seat is the town of Eldivan. Its area is 350 km^{2}, and its population is 5,977 (2021).

== Composition ==
There is one municipality in Eldivan District:

- Eldivan

There are 16 villages in Eldivan District:

- Akbulut
- Akçalı
- Alva
- Büyükhacıbey
- Çiftlikköy
- Çukuröz
- Elmacı
- Gölez
- Gölezkayı
- Hisarcık
- Hisarcıkkayı
- Küçükhacıbey
- Sarayköy
- Sarıtarla
- Seydiköy
- Yukarıyanlar
