= Büyükbahçeli, Kızılırmak =

Village in Turkey

Büyükbahçeli
- Village
- Location in Turkey Büyükbahçeli (Turkey Central Anatolia)
- Coordinates: 40°25′N 34°00′E
- Country: Turkey
- Province: Çankırı
- District: Kızılırmak
- Population (2021): 42
- Time zone: UTC+3 (TRT)

Büyükbahçeli is a village in the Kızılırmak District of Çankırı Province in Turkey. Its population is 42 (2021).
