= Aşağımeydan, Ilgaz =

Village in Turkey

Aşağımeydan
- Village
- Location in Turkey Aşağımeydan (Turkey Central Anatolia)
- Coordinates: 40.9660°N 33.6514°E
- Country: Turkey
- Province: Çankırı
- District: Ilgaz
- Population (2021): 18
- Time zone: UTC+3 (TRT)

Aşağımeydan is a village in the Ilgaz District of Çankırı Province in Turkey. Its population is 18 (2021).
