= Sarayköy, Eldivan =

Village in Turkey

Sarayköy
- Village
- Country: Turkey
- Province: Çankırı
- District: Eldivan
- Population (2021): 412
- Time zone: UTC+3 (TRT)

Sarayköy is a village in the Eldivan District of Çankırı Province in Turkey. Its population was 412 in 2021.
