= Küçükyakalı, Şabanözü =

Village in Turkey

Küçükyakalı
- Village
- Location in Turkey Küçükyakalı (Turkey Central Anatolia)
- Coordinates: 40°28′21″N 33°12′23″E
- Country: Turkey
- Province: Çankırı
- District: Şabanözü
- Population (2021): 327
- Time zone: UTC+3 (TRT)

Küçükyakalı is a village in the Şabanözü District of Çankırı Province in Turkey. Its population is 327 (2021).
