= Çaltıpınar, Ilgaz =

Village in Turkey

Çaltıpınar
- Village
- Location in Turkey Çaltıpınar (Turkey Central Anatolia)
- Coordinates: 40°55′50″N 33°34′55″E
- Country: Turkey
- Province: Çankırı
- District: Ilgaz
- Population (2021): 38
- Time zone: UTC+3 (TRT)

Çaltıpınar is a village in the Ilgaz District of Çankırı Province in Turkey. Its population is 38 (2021).
