= Aktaş, Ilgaz =

Village in Turkey

Aktaş
- Village
- Location in Turkey Aktaş (Turkey Central Anatolia)
- Coordinates: 40.8551°N 33.5726°E
- Country: Turkey
- Province: Çankırı
- District: Ilgaz
- Population (2021): 69
- Time zone: UTC+3 (TRT)

Aktaş is a village in the Ilgaz District of Çankırı Province in Turkey. Its population is 69 (2021).
