= Karamürsel, Kızılırmak =

Village in Turkey

Karamürsel
- Village
- Country: Turkey
- Province: Çankırı
- District: Kızılırmak
- Population (2021): 231
- Time zone: UTC+3 (TRT)

Karamürsel is a village in the Kızılırmak District of Çankırı Province in Turkey. Its population is 231 (2021).
