= Candere, Ilgaz =

Village in Turkey

Candere
- Village
- Location in Turkey Candere (Turkey Central Anatolia)
- Coordinates: 40°55′N 33°39′E
- Country: Turkey
- Province: Çankırı
- District: Ilgaz
- Population (2021): 41
- Time zone: UTC+3 (TRT)

Candere (also: Cendere) is a village in the Ilgaz District of Çankırı Province in Turkey. Its population is 41 (2021).
