= Balcı, Ilgaz =

Village in Turkey

Balcı
- Village
- Location in Turkey Balcı (Turkey Central Anatolia)
- Coordinates: 41.0458°N 33.4744°E
- Country: Turkey
- Province: Çankırı
- District: Ilgaz
- Population (2021): 81
- Time zone: UTC+3 (TRT)

Balcı is a village in the Ilgaz District of Çankırı Province in Turkey. Its population is 81 (2021).
