= Aşıklar, Ilgaz =

Village in Turkey

Aşıklar
- Village
- Location in Turkey Aşıklar (Turkey Central Anatolia)
- Coordinates: 40.9265°N 33.4529°E
- Country: Turkey
- Province: Çankırı
- District: Ilgaz
- Population (2021): 39
- Time zone: UTC+3 (TRT)

Aşıklar is a village in the Ilgaz District of Çankırı Province in Turkey. Its population is 39 (2021).
