= Gölezkayı, Eldivan =

Village in Turkey

Gölezkayı
- Village
- Location in Turkey Gölezkayı (Turkey Central Anatolia)
- Coordinates: 40°31′N 33°32′E
- Country: Turkey
- Province: Çankırı
- District: Eldivan
- Population (2021): 186
- Time zone: UTC+3 (TRT)

Gölezkayı is a village in the Eldivan District of Çankırı Province in Turkey. Its population is 186 (2021).
