= Yenidemirciler, Ilgaz =

Village in Turkey

Yenidemirciler
- Village
- Location in Turkey Yenidemirciler (Turkey Central Anatolia)
- Coordinates: 40°54′N 33°31′E
- Country: Turkey
- Province: Çankırı
- District: Ilgaz
- Population (2021): 47
- Time zone: UTC+3 (TRT)

Yenidemirciler is a village in the Ilgaz District of Çankırı Province in Turkey. Its population is 47 (2021).
