= Yeşildumlupınar, Ilgaz =

Village in Turkey

Yeşildumlupınar
- Village
- Location in Turkey Yeşildumlupınar (Turkey Central Anatolia)
- Coordinates: 40°55′N 33°24′E
- Country: Turkey
- Province: Çankırı
- District: Ilgaz
- Population (2021): 246
- Time zone: UTC+3 (TRT)

Yeşildumlupınar is a village in the Ilgaz District of Çankırı Province in Turkey. Its population is 246 (2021). Before the 2013 reorganisation, it was a town (belde).
