= Kavlaklı, Kızılırmak =

Village in Turkey

Kavlaklı
- Village
- Country: Turkey
- Province: Çankırı
- District: Kızılırmak
- Population (2021): 233
- Time zone: UTC+3 (TRT)

Kavlaklı is a village in the Kızılırmak District of Çankırı Province in Turkey. Its population is 233 (2021).
