= Çeltikbaşı, Ilgaz =

Village in Turkey

Çeltikbaşı
- Village
- Location in Turkey Çeltikbaşı (Turkey Central Anatolia)
- Coordinates: 40.907778°N 33.786111°E
- Country: Turkey
- Province: Çankırı
- District: Ilgaz
- Population (2021): 91
- Time zone: UTC+3 (TRT)

Çeltikbaşı is a village in the Ilgaz District of Çankırı Province in Turkey. Its population is 91 (2021).
