= Alpsarı, Korgun =

Village in Turkey

Alpsarı
- Village
- Location in Turkey Alpsarı (Turkey Central Anatolia)
- Coordinates: 40.6842°N 33.5303°E
- Country: Turkey
- Province: Çankırı
- District: Korgun
- Population (2021): 69
- Time zone: UTC+3 (TRT)

Alpsarı is a village in the Korgun District of Çankırı Province in Turkey. Its population is 69 (2021).
