= Ilısılık, Ilgaz =

Village in Turkey

Ilısılık
- Village
- Location in Turkey Ilısılık (Turkey Central Anatolia)
- Coordinates: 40°50′13″N 33°41′43″E
- Country: Turkey
- Province: Çankırı
- District: Ilgaz
- Population (2021): 176
- Time zone: UTC+3 (TRT)

Ilısılık is a village in the Ilgaz District of Çankırı Province in Turkey. Its population is 176 (2021).
