= Çukuröz, Eldivan =

Village in Turkey

Coordinates: 40.606°N 33.441°E

Çukuröz
- Village
- Location in Turkey Çukuröz (Turkey Central Anatolia)
- Coordinates
- Country: Turkey
- Province: Çankırı
- District: Eldivan
- Population (2021): 110
- Time zone: UTC+3 (TRT)

Çukuröz is a village in the Eldivan District of Çankırı Province in Turkey. Its population is 110 (2021).
