= Kemallı, Kızılırmak =

Village in Turkey

Kemallı
- Village
- Country: Turkey
- Province: Çankırı
- District: Kızılırmak
- Population (2021): 278
- Time zone: UTC+3 (TRT)

Kemallı is a village in the Kızılırmak District of Çankırı Province in Turkey. Its population is 278 (2021).
