= Hisarcıkkayı, Eldivan =

Village in Turkey

Hisarcıkkayı
- Village
- Location in Turkey Hisarcıkkayı (Turkey Central Anatolia)
- Coordinates: 40°24′52″N 33°28′51″E
- Country: Turkey
- Province: Çankırı
- District: Eldivan
- Population (2021): 447
- Time zone: UTC+3 (TRT)

Hisarcıkkayı is a village in the Eldivan District of Çankırı Province in Turkey. Its population is 447 (2021).
