= İkiçam, Korgun =

Village in Turkey

İkiçam
- Village
- Location in Turkey İkiçam (Turkey Central Anatolia)
- Coordinates: 40°44′N 33°34′E
- Country: Turkey
- Province: Çankırı
- District: Korgun
- Population (2021): 63
- Time zone: UTC+3 (TRT)

İkiçam is a village in the Korgun District of Çankırı Province in Turkey. Its population is 63 (2021).
