= Martköy, Şabanözü =

Village in Turkey

Martköy
- Village
- Location in Turkey Martköy (Turkey Central Anatolia)
- Coordinates: 40°26′N 33°24′E
- Country: Turkey
- Province: Çankırı
- District: Şabanözü
- Population (2021): 195
- Time zone: UTC+3 (TRT)

Martköy is a village in the Şabanözü District of Çankırı Province in Turkey. Its population is 195 (2021).
