= Çiftlikköy, Eldivan =

Village in Turkey

Çiftlikköy
- Village
- Country: Turkey
- Province: Çankırı
- District: Eldivan
- Population (2021): 146
- Time zone: UTC+3 (TRT)

Çiftlikköy is a village in the Eldivan District of Çankırı Province in Turkey. Its population is 146 (2021).
