= Sarmaşık, Ilgaz =

Village in Turkey

Sarmaşık
- Village
- Location in Turkey Sarmaşık (Turkey Central Anatolia)
- Coordinates: 40.878889°N 33.703056°E
- Country: Turkey
- Province: Çankırı
- District: Ilgaz
- Population (2021): 101
- Time zone: UTC+3 (TRT)

Sarmaşık is a village in the Ilgaz District of Çankırı Province in Turkey. Its population is 101 (2021).
