= Beyköy, Ilgaz =

Village in Turkey

Beyköy
- Village
- Location in Turkey Beyköy (Turkey Central Anatolia)
- Coordinates: 40.9896°N 33.7324°E
- Country: Turkey
- Province: Çankırı
- District: Ilgaz
- Population (2021): 28
- Time zone: UTC+3 (TRT)

Beyköy is a village in the Ilgaz District of Çankırı Province in Turkey. Its population is 28 (2021).
