= Korçullu, Kızılırmak =

Village in Turkey

Korçullu
- Village
- Location in Turkey Korçullu (Turkey Central Anatolia)
- Coordinates: 40°19′N 34°02′E
- Country: Turkey
- Province: Çankırı
- District: Kızılırmak
- Population (2021): 254
- Time zone: UTC+3 (TRT)

Korçullu is a village in the Kızılırmak District of Çankırı Province in Turkey. Its population is 254 (2021).
