= Boyacıoğlu, Kızılırmak =

Village in Turkey

Boyacıoğlu
- Village
- Location within Turkey Location within Turkey Central Anatolia
- Coordinates: 40.4472°N 34.0294°E
- Country: Turkey
- Province: Çankırı
- District: Kızılırmak
- Population (2021): 71
- Time zone: UTC+3 (TRT)

Boyacıoğlu is a village in the Kızılırmak District of Çankırı Province in Turkey. Its population is 71 (2021).
