= Yukarıbozan, Ilgaz =

Village in Turkey

Yukarıbozan
- Village
- Location in Turkey Yukarıbozan (Turkey Central Anatolia)
- Coordinates: 40°58′N 33°35′E
- Country: Turkey
- Province: Çankırı
- District: Ilgaz
- Population (2021): 56
- Time zone: UTC+3 (TRT)

Yukarıbozan is a village in the Ilgaz District of Çankırı Province in Turkey. Its population is 56 (2021).
