= Dikenli, Korgun =

Village in Turkey

Dikenli
- Village
- Country: Turkey
- Province: Çankırı
- District: Korgun
- Population (2021): 107
- Time zone: UTC+3 (TRT)

Dikenli is a village in the Korgun District of Çankırı Province in Turkey. Its population is 107 (2021).
