= Kuyupınar, Ilgaz =

Village in Turkey

Kuyupınar
- Village
- Country: Turkey
- Province: Çankırı
- District: Ilgaz
- Population (2021): 75
- Time zone: UTC+3 (TRT)

Kuyupınar is a village in the Ilgaz District of Çankırı Province in Turkey. Its population is 75 (2021).
