= Ottoman gunpowder magazine of Larissa =

Coordinates: 39°37′57.1″N 22°25′26.0″E

The Ottoman gunpowder magazine (Greek: Οθωμανική πυριτιδαποθήκη) is an Ottoman gunpowder magazine in the city of Larissa, Greece.

The building is located on Ioustinianou Street, within the grounds of the 5th Gymnasium–Lyceum. In Ottoman times, the site was close to the Farsala Gate of the city wall, and a military encampment existed there. The gunpowder magazine was built around 1750.

The magazine is an elongated stone building with three arch-roofed halls, one transverse and two vertical to the building axis. In modern times, it was used as a prison cell for the nearby Larissa prison facilities, but today it has been restored by the Municipality of Larissa and the Larissa Ephorate of Antiquities, and houses the National Resistance Museum of Larissa.
