= Tımarlı, Kızılırmak =

Village in Turkey

Tımarlı
- Village
- Location in Turkey Tımarlı (Turkey Central Anatolia)
- Coordinates: 40°20′26″N 33°56′40″E
- Country: Turkey
- Province: Çankırı
- District: Kızılırmak
- Population (2021): 306
- Time zone: UTC+3 (TRT)

Tımarlı is a village in the Kızılırmak District of Çankırı Province in Turkey. Its population is 306 (2021).
