= Stavros, Larissa =

Stavros Σταυρός
- Community
- Location within Greece
- Coordinates: 39°19′N 22°15′E
- Country: Greece
- Administrative region: Thessaly
- Regional unit: Larissa
- Municipality: Farsala
- Municipal unit: Enippeas

Population (2021)
  - Community: 465
- Time zone: UTC+2 (EET)
  - Summer (DST): UTC+3 (EEST)
- Vehicle registration: ΡΙ

Stavros (Greek: Σταυρός, Stavrós; before 1927: Demerli (Δεμερλή, Demerli)) is a village in the south of the Larissa regional unit, Greece. It is part of the municipal unit of Enippeas. In 2021 its population was 465. Stavros is located 12 km (7.5 mi) west of Farsala, 28 km (17 mi) east of Karditsa and 38 km (24 mi) southwest of Larissa. The important railway junction Palaiofarsalos is situated in Stavros.
