= İkikavak, Ilgaz =

Village in Turkey

İkikavak
- Village
- Location in Turkey İkikavak (Turkey Central Anatolia)
- Coordinates: 40°55′N 33°25′E
- Country: Turkey
- Province: Çankırı
- District: Ilgaz
- Population (2021): 88
- Time zone: UTC+3 (TRT)

İkikavak is a village in the Ilgaz District of Çankırı Province in Turkey. Its population is 88 (2021).
