= Alva, Eldivan =

Village in Turkey

Alva
- Village
- Location in Turkey Alva (Turkey Central Anatolia)
- Coordinates: 40°32′N 33°33′E
- Country: Turkey
- Province: Çankırı
- District: Eldivan
- Population (2021): 86
- Time zone: UTC+3 (TRT)

Alva is a village in the Eldivan District of Çankırı Province in Turkey. Its population is 86 (2021).
