= İnköy, Ilgaz =

Village in Turkey

İnköy
- Village
- Location in Turkey İnköy (Turkey Central Anatolia)
- Coordinates: 40.901389°N 33.651944°E
- Country: Turkey
- Province: Çankırı
- District: Ilgaz
- Population (2021): 52
- Time zone: UTC+3 (TRT)

İnköy is a village in the Ilgaz District of Çankırı Province in Turkey. Its population is 52 (2021).
