= Karatekin, Korgun =

Village in Turkey

Karatekin
- Village
- Location in Turkey Karatekin (Turkey Central Anatolia)
- Coordinates: 40°39′58″N 33°30′35″E
- Country: Turkey
- Province: Çankırı
- District: Korgun
- Population (2021): 143
- Time zone: UTC+3 (TRT)

Karatekin is a village in the Korgun District of Çankırı Province in Turkey. Its population is 143 (2021).
