= Cacıklar, Kızılırmak =

Village in Turkey

Cacıklar
- Village
- Location in Turkey Cacıklar (Turkey Central Anatolia)
- Coordinates: 40°26′N 34°08′E
- Country: Turkey
- Province: Çankırı
- District: Kızılırmak
- Population (2021): 161
- Time zone: UTC+3 (TRT)

Cacıklar is a village in the Kızılırmak District of Çankırı Province in Turkey. Its population is 161 (2021).
