= Karamusa, Şabanözü =

Village in Turkey

Karamusa
- Village
- Location in Turkey Karamusa (Turkey Central Anatolia)
- Coordinates: 40.3430°N 33.2555°E
- Country: Turkey
- Province: Çankırı
- District: Şabanözü
- Population (2021): 94
- Time zone: UTC+3 (TRT)

Karamusa is a village in the Şabanözü District of Çankırı Province in Turkey. Its population is 94 (2021).
