= Saraycık, Kızılırmak =

Village in Turkey

Saraycık
- Village
- Location in Turkey Saraycık (Turkey Central Anatolia)
- Coordinates: 40.295°N 33.9361°E
- Country: Turkey
- Province: Çankırı
- District: Kızılırmak
- Population (2021): 56
- Time zone: UTC+3 (TRT)

Saraycık is a village in the Kızılırmak District of Çankırı Province in Turkey. Its population is 56 (2021).
