= Sakarca, Kızılırmak =

Village in Turkey

Sakarca
- Village
- Location in Turkey Sakarca (Turkey Central Anatolia)
- Coordinates: 40°23′17″N 34°02′22″E
- Country: Turkey
- Province: Çankırı
- District: Kızılırmak
- Population (2021): 105
- Time zone: UTC+3 (TRT)

Sakarca is a village in the Kızılırmak District of Çankırı Province in Turkey. Its population is 105 (2021).
