= Kuzeykışla, Kızılırmak =

Village in Turkey

Kuzeykışla
- Village
- Location in Turkey Kuzeykışla (Turkey Central Anatolia)
- Coordinates: 40°22′N 34°04′E
- Country: Turkey
- Province: Çankırı
- District: Kızılırmak
- Population (2021): 119
- Time zone: UTC+3 (TRT)

Kuzeykışla is a village in the Kızılırmak District of Çankırı Province in Turkey. Its population is 119 (2021).
