= Şabanözü =

- Municipality
- Location in Turkey Şabanözü (Turkey Central Anatolia)
- Coordinates: 40°28′57″N 33°17′01″E
- Country: Turkey
- Province: Çankırı
- District: Şabanözü

Government
  - Mayor: Faik Özcan (AKP)
- Elevation: 1,095 m (3,593 ft)
- Population (2021): 8,843
- Time zone: UTC+3 (TRT)
- Area code: 0376
- Website: sabanozu.bel.tr

Şabanözü is a town in Çankırı Province, Turkey. It is nearly 80 km (50 mi) from Ankara and 100 km (62 mi) from Çankırı. It is the seat of Şabanözü District. Its population is 8,843 (2021). The town consists of 7 quarters: Cumhuriyet, Sağlık, Yeni, Mahmudiye, Gürpınar, Gümerdiğin and Karaören. Its elevation is 1,095 m (3,593 ft).

== Economy ==
Every Monday is the day for bazaar (farmer's market) which takes place in the centrum. Wheat, beans, corn and various fruit are the agricultural products of the fields that are rich of natural water resources. Gümerdiğin is one of the biggest towns of the district.

Unemployment rate is zero in Şabanözü and it is the record for Turkey.
