= Güneyköy, Ilgaz =

Village in Turkey

Güneyköy
- Village
- Location in Turkey Güneyköy (Turkey Central Anatolia)
- Coordinates: 40.921944°N 33.472222°E
- Country: Turkey
- Province: Çankırı
- District: Ilgaz
- Population (2021): 35
- Time zone: UTC+3 (TRT)

Güneyköy is a village in the Ilgaz District of Çankırı Province in Turkey. Its population is 35 (2021).
