= Kızılırmak, Çankırı =

Kızılırmak
- Municipality
- Location in Turkey Kızılırmak (Turkey Central Anatolia)
- Coordinates: 40°20′N 33°59′E
- Country: Turkey
- Province: Çankırı
- District: Kızılırmak

Government
  - Mayor: Bayar Soysal (AKP)
- Population (2021): 2,604
- Time zone: UTC+3 (TRT)
- Area code: 0376
- Website: www.kizilirmak.bel.tr

Kızılırmak is a town in Çankırı Province in the Central Anatolia region of Turkey. It takes its name from the river Kızılırmak. It is the seat of Kızılırmak District. Its population is 2,604 (2021).
