= Enippeas =

Enippeas Ενιππέας
- Municipal unit
- Location within the regional unit

- Location within Greece
- Coordinates: 39°21′N 22°18′E
- Country: Greece
- Administrative region: Thessaly
- Regional unit: Larissa
- Municipality: Farsala

Area
  - Municipal unit: 161.252 km^{2} (62.260 sq mi)
- Elevation: 128 m (420 ft)

Population (2021)
  - Municipal unit: 2,618
  - Municipal unit density: 16.24/km^{2} (42.05/sq mi)
- Time zone: UTC+2 (EET)
  - Summer (DST): UTC+3 (EEST)
- Vehicle registration: ΡΙ

Enippeas (Greek: Ἐνιππέας) is a former municipality in the Larissa regional unit, Thessaly, Greece, named after the river Enippeas. Since the 2011 local government reform it is part of the municipality Farsala, of which it is a municipal unit. Population 2,618 (2021). The municipal unit has an area of 161.252 km^{2}. The seat of the municipality was in Megalo Efidrio.
