= Göldağı, Şabanözü =

Village in Turkey

Göldağı
- Village
- Location in Turkey Göldağı (Turkey Central Anatolia)
- Coordinates: 40.4015°N 33.2591°E
- Country: Turkey
- Province: Çankırı
- District: Şabanözü
- Population (2021): 44
- Time zone: UTC+3 (TRT)

Göldağı is a village in the Şabanözü District of Çankırı Province in Turkey. Its population is 44 (2021).
