= Atkaracalar District =

District of Çankırı Province, Turkey

- District
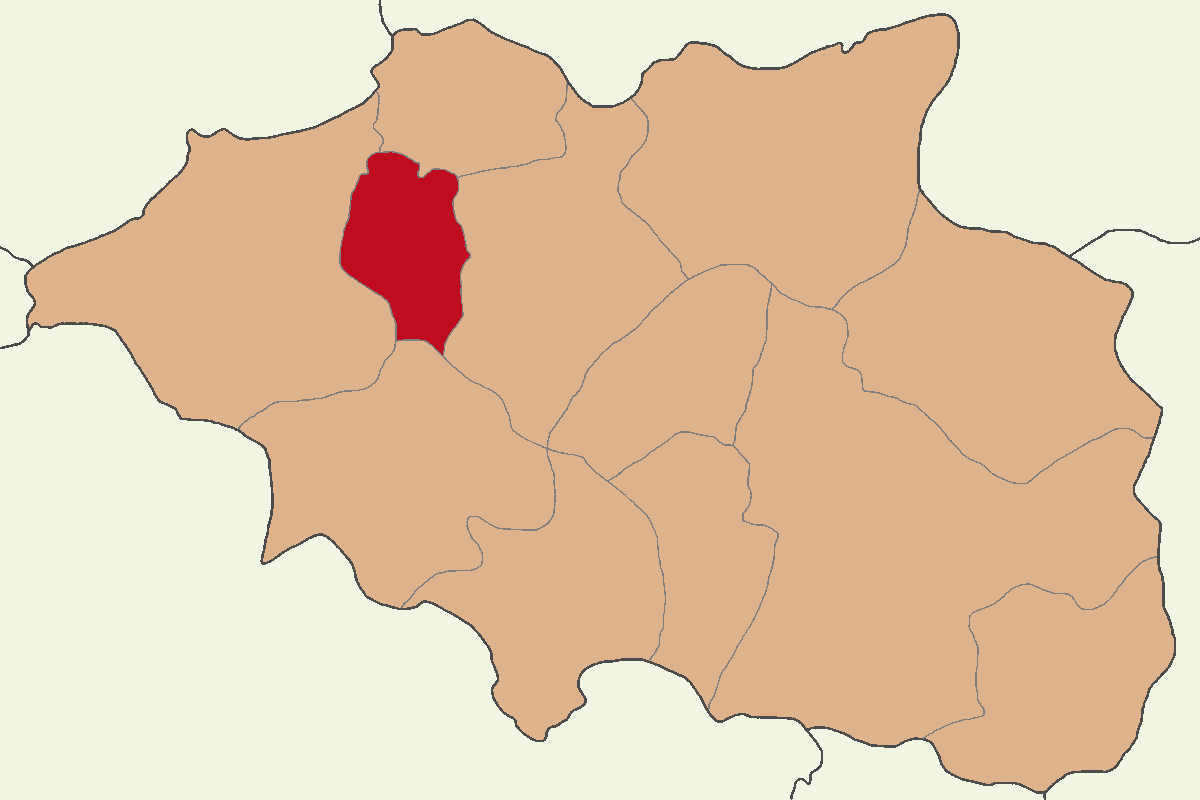
- Map showing Atkaracalar District in Çankırı Province

- Location in Turkey Atkaracalar District (Turkey Central Anatolia)
- Coordinates: 40°49′N 33°04′E
- Country: Turkey
- Province: Çankırı
- Seat: Atkaracalar

Government
  - Kaymakam: Zübeyir Yıldırım
- Area: 234 km^{2} (90 sq mi)
- Population (2021): 4,968
  - Density: 21/km^{2} (55/sq mi)
- Time zone: UTC+3 (TRT)
- Website: www.atkaracalar.gov.tr

Atkaracalar District is a district of the Çankırı Province of Turkey. Its seat is the town of Atkaracalar. Its area is 234 km^{2}, and its population is 4,968 (2021).

== Composition ==
There are two municipalities in Atkaracalar District:

- Atkaracalar
- Çardaklı

There are eight villages in Atkaracalar District:

- Budakpınar
- Demirli
- Eyüpözü
- Hüyükköy
- Kızılibrik
- Kükürt
- Susuz
- Yakalı
