= Serçeler, Ilgaz =

Village in Turkey

Serçeler
- Village
- Country: Turkey
- Province: Çankırı
- District: Ilgaz
- Population (2021): 38
- Time zone: UTC+3 (TRT)

Serçeler is a village in the Ilgaz District of Çankırı Province in Turkey. Its population is 38 (2021).
