= Kükürt, Atkaracalar =

Village in Turkey

Kükürt
- Village
- Country: Turkey
- Province: Çankırı
- District: Atkaracalar
- Population (2021): 129
- Time zone: UTC+3 (TRT)

Kükürt is a village in the Atkaracalar District of Çankırı Province in Turkey. Its population is 129 (2021).
