= Akçaören, Ilgaz =

Village in Turkey

Akçaören
- Village
- Location in Turkey Akçaören (Turkey Central Anatolia)
- Coordinates: 40.9608°N 33.5099°E
- Country: Turkey
- Province: Çankırı
- District: Ilgaz
- Population (2021): 25
- Time zone: UTC+3 (TRT)

Akçaören is a village in the Ilgaz District of Çankırı Province in Turkey. Its population is 25 (2021).
