= Yeniyapan, Kızılırmak =

Village in Turkey

Yeniyapan
- Village
- Country: Turkey
- Province: Çankırı
- District: Kızılırmak
- Population (2021): 47
- Time zone: UTC+3 (TRT)

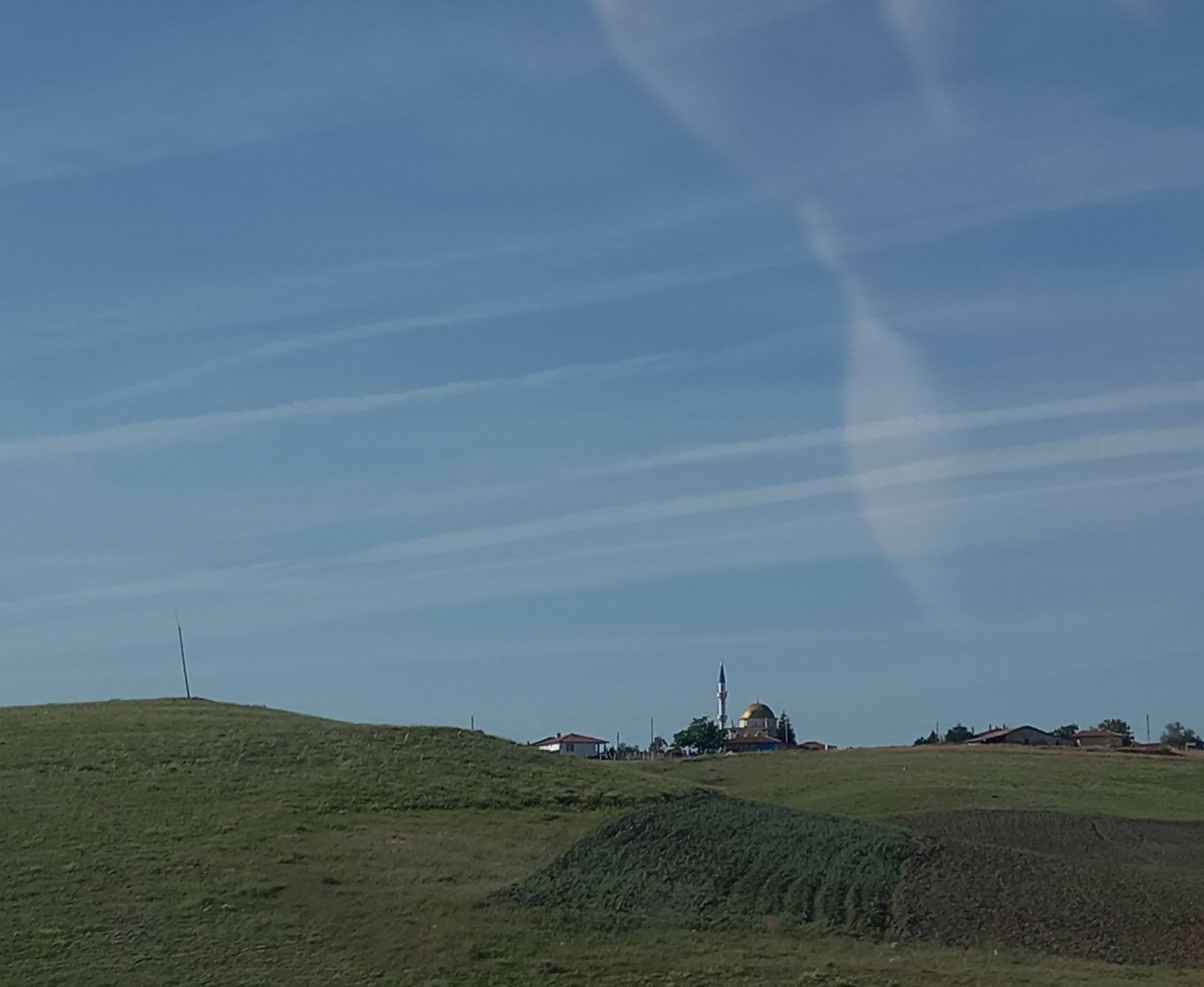
Yeniyapan, Kızılırmak seen from D 180 state road

Yeniyapan is a village in the Kızılırmak District of Çankırı Province in Turkey. Its population is 47 (2021).
