= Gaziler, Ilgaz =

Village in Turkey

Gaziler
- Village
- Location in Turkey Gaziler (Turkey Central Anatolia)
- Coordinates: 40°53′52″N 33°36′09″E
- Country: Turkey
- Province: Çankırı
- District: Ilgaz
- Population (2021): 111
- Time zone: UTC+3 (TRT)

Gaziler is a village in the Ilgaz District of Çankırı Province in Turkey. Its population is 111 (2021).
