= Hüyükköy, Atkaracalar =

Village in Turkey

Hüyükköy
- Village
- Country: Turkey
- Province: Çankırı
- District: Atkaracalar
- Population (2021): 121
- Time zone: UTC+3 (TRT)

Hüyükköy is a village in the Atkaracalar District of Çankırı Province in Turkey. As of 2021 the population was 121 persons.
