= Halaçlı, Kızılırmak =

Village in Turkey

Halaçlı
- Village
- Location in Turkey Halaçlı (Turkey Central Anatolia)
- Coordinates: 40°17′19″N 33°56′56″E
- Country: Turkey
- Province: Çankırı
- District: Kızılırmak
- Population (2021): 126
- Time zone: UTC+3 (TRT)

Halaçlı is a village in the Kızılırmak District of Çankırı Province in Turkey. Its population is 126 (2021).
