= Şıhlar, Korgun =

Village in Turkey

Şıhlar
- Village
- Country: Turkey
- Province: Çankırı
- District: Korgun
- Population (2021): 83
- Time zone: UTC+3 (TRT)

Şıhlar is a village in the Korgun District of Çankırı Province in Turkey. Its population is 83 (2021).

The name Şıhlar was first mentioned in 1896. Between 1960-2013, the village is referred to as Karatepe in the records of Turkstat. It was renamed to its current name in 2012.
