= Şıhlar, Alanya =

Şıhlar
- Neighbourhood
- Location in Turkey
- Coordinates: 36.5011°N 32.2398°E
- Country: Turkey
- Province: Antalya
- District: Alanya
- Population (2022): 622
- Time zone: UTC+3 (TRT)

Şıhlar (also: Şeyhler) is a neighbourhood in the municipality and district of Alanya, Antalya Province, Turkey. Its population is 622 (2022).
