= Tsaghkashen, Nagorno-Karabakh =

Tsaghkashen / Damirli Ծաղկաշեն / Dəmirli
- Location within Azerbaijan
- Coordinates: 40°10′43.6″N 46°45′54.8″E
- Country: Azerbaijan
  - District: Aghdara

Population (2015)
  - Total: 154
- Time zone: UTC+4 (AZT)

Tsaghkashen (Armenian: Ծաղկաշեն) or Damirli (Azerbaijani: Dəmirli) is a village located in the Aghdara District of Azerbaijan, in the region of Nagorno-Karabakh. Until 2023 it was controlled by the breakaway Republic of Artsakh. The village had an ethnic Armenian-majority population until the expulsion of the Armenian population of Nagorno-Karabakh by Azerbaijan following the 2023 Azerbaijani offensive in Nagorno-Karabakh.

== History ==
During the Soviet period, the village was part of the Mardakert District of the Nagorno-Karabakh Autonomous Oblast.

During the First Nagorno-Karabakh War, the village was under the control of Armenian troops by the first half of 1992, then captured by Azerbaijani troops in 4 July 1992 during Operation Goranboy. Finally it was captured by Armenian forces on 27 July 1993.

== Economy and culture ==
The population is mainly engaged in agriculture and animal husbandry. As of 2015, the village has a municipal building, a house of culture, the Tsaghkashen branch of the Nerkin Horatagh secondary school, and a medical centre.

== Demographics ==
The village had 137 inhabitants in 2005, and 154 inhabitants in 2015.
