= Buğay, Korgun =

Village in Turkey

Buğay
- Village
- Location in Turkey Buğay (Turkey Central Anatolia)
- Coordinates: 40.7137°N 33.4892°E
- Country: Turkey
- Province: Çankırı
- District: Korgun
- Population (2021): 139
- Time zone: UTC+3 (TRT)

Buğay is a village in the Korgun District of Çankırı Province in Turkey. Its population is 139 (2021).
