= Karahacı, Şabanözü =

Village in Turkey

Karahacı
- Village
- Country: Turkey
- Province: Çankırı
- District: Şabanözü
- Population (2021): 154
- Time zone: UTC+3 (TRT)

Karahacı is a Turk-Alevi village in the Şabanözü District of Çankırı Province. Its population is 154 (2021). Among the nomadic communities in Anatolia, there are the Karahacı, Karahacılar, Karahacılı and Karahacılu tribes, which are the Avşar clan of the Oghuzs. These tribes were dispersed to different parts of Anatolia by the Ottoman Empire, including the Sanjak of Çankırı.

Karahacı Village was founded in the 16th century by the great grandfathers of the Caferoğlu family, a member of the Karahacılı tribe of Avşars who came to Çankırı from Kahramanmaraş, and it grew over time.

== Sources ==
Cevdet Türkay (2005). Türk Boyları. Başbakanlık Arşiv Belgelerine Göre Osmanlı İmparatorluğu'nda Oymak, Aşiret ve Cemaatlar. İşaret Yayınları. ss. 425-495.
