= Ilgaz =

- Municipality
- Location in Turkey Ilgaz (Turkey Central Anatolia)
- Coordinates: 40°55′30″N 33°37′33″E
- Country: Turkey
- Province: Çankırı
- District: Ilgaz

Government
  - Mayor: Mehmed Öztürk (AKP)
- Elevation: 920 m (3,020 ft)
- Population (2021): 7,825
- Time zone: UTC+3 (TRT)
- Area code: 0376
- Website: www.ilgaz.bel.tr

Ilgaz (Turkish pronunciation: [ɯɫˈɡaz]), formerly Koçhisar, is a town in Çankırı Province in the Central Anatolia region of Turkey. It is the seat of Ilgaz District. Its population is 7,825 (2021). It lies at the southern foot of the Ilgaz Mountains, that extend between Çankırı and Kastamonu provinces. The mountain is home to ski resorts.
