= Çapar, Şabanözü =

Village in Turkey

Çapar
- Village
- Location in Turkey Çapar (Turkey Central Anatolia)
- Coordinates: 40.5019°N 33.385°E
- Country: Turkey
- Province: Çankırı
- District: Şabanözü
- Population (2021): 50
- Time zone: UTC+3 (TRT)

Çapar is a village in the Şabanözü District of Çankırı Province in Turkey. Its population is 50 (2021).
