= Kızılibrik, Atkaracalar =

Village in Turkey

Kızılibrik
- Village
- Location in Turkey Kızılibrik (Turkey Central Anatolia)
- Coordinates: 40°53′52″N 33°02′12″E
- Country: Turkey
- Province: Çankırı
- District: Atkaracalar
- Population (2021): 53
- Time zone: UTC+3 (TRT)

Kızılibrik is a village in the Atkaracalar District of Çankırı Province in Turkey. Its population is 53 (2021).
