= Şabanözü District =

District of Çankırı Province, Turkey

- District
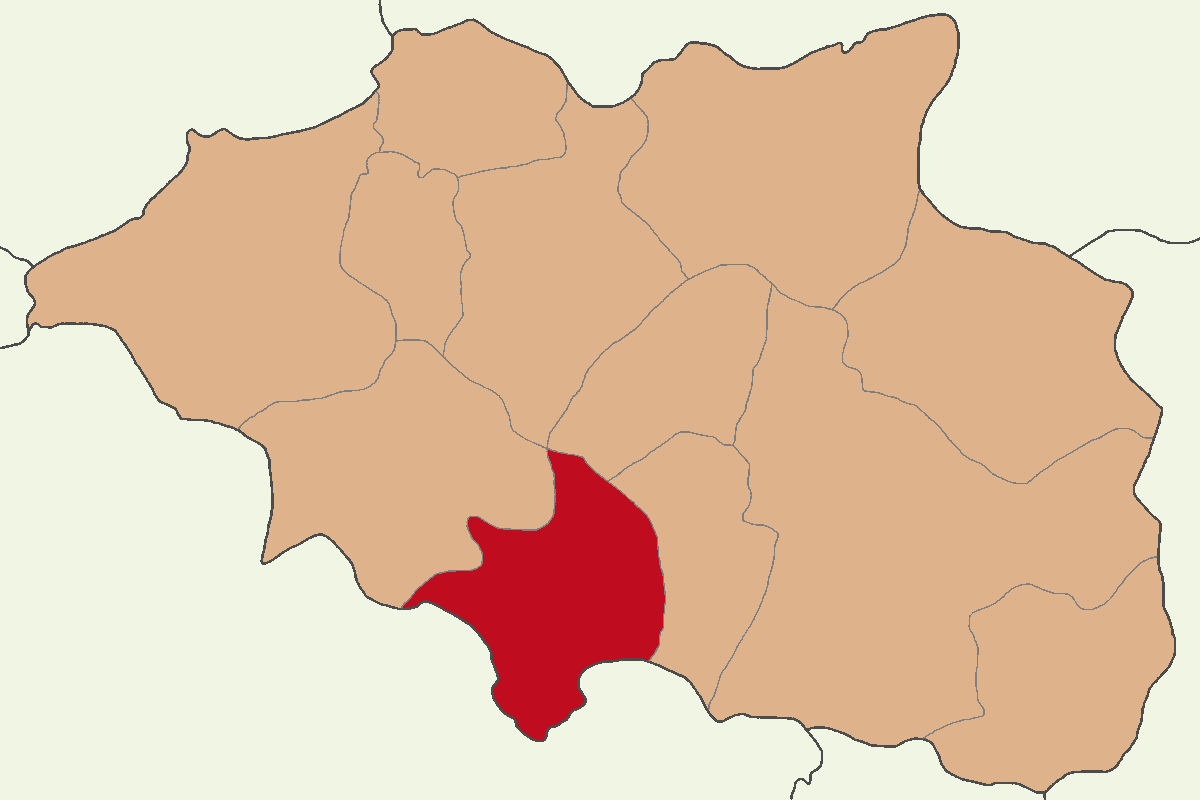
- Map showing Şabanözü District in Çankırı Province

- Location in Turkey Şabanözü District (Turkey Central Anatolia)
- Coordinates: 40°28′N 33°16′E
- Country: Turkey
- Province: Çankırı
- Seat: Şabanözü

Government
  - Kaymakam: Mehmet Zahid Uzun
- Area: 467 km^{2} (180 sq mi)
- Population (2021): 11,657
  - Density: 25/km^{2} (65/sq mi)
- Time zone: UTC+3 (TRT)
- Website: www.sabanozu.gov.tr

Şabanözü District is a district of the Çankırı Province of Turkey. Its seat is the town of Şabanözü. Its area is 467 km^{2}, and its population is 11,657 (2021).

== Composition ==
There is one municipality in Şabanözü District:

- Şabanözü

There are 18 villages in Şabanözü District:

- Bakırlı
- Bulduk
- Bulgurcu
- Büyükyakalı
- Çapar
- Çaparkayı
- Çerçi
- Göldağı
- Gündoğmuş
- Kamışköy
- Karahacı
- Karakoçaş
- Karamusa
- Küçükyakalı
- Kutluşar
- Martköy
- Ödek
- Özbek
