= Çankırı Province =

Province of Turkey

Coordinates: 40°44′08″N 33°21′58″E

Çankırı Province Çankırı ili
- Province
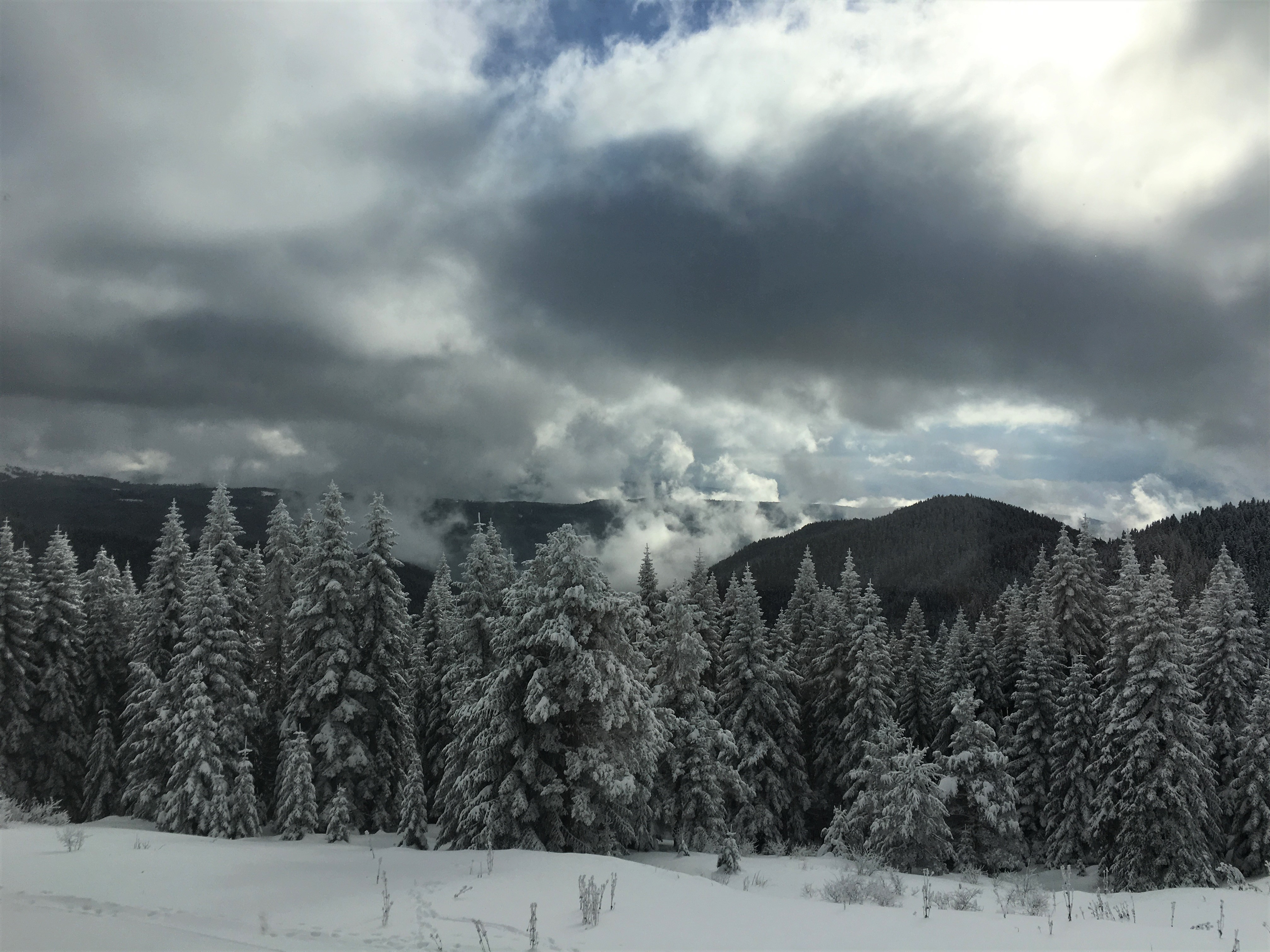
- Ilgaz Mountains

- Location of the province within Turkey
- Country: Turkey
- Seat: Çankırı

Government
  - Governor: Hüseyin Çakırtaş
- Area: 7,542 km^{2} (2,912 sq mi)
- Population (2022): 195,766
  - Density: 25.96/km^{2} (67.23/sq mi)
- Time zone: UTC+3 (TRT)
- Area code: 0376
- Website: www.cankiri.gov.tr

Çankırı Province (Turkish: Çankırı ili) is a province of Turkey, which lies close to the capital, Ankara. The provincial capital is Çankırı. Its area is 7,542 km^{2}, and its population is 195,766 (2022).

== Economy ==
The economy of Çankırı Province primarily runs on agriculture, with wheat, barley, beans, corn, vetch and potatoes being the most commonly cultivated and exported crops.

== Geography and climate ==
Around 60% of Çankırı Province's territory is mountainous, with three sets of mountain ranges along the northern province borders. The southern part of the province is comparatively flat and bare, with a major plain located around the Kızılırmak district and smaller plains spread throughout the province.

Çankırı Province's climate is heavily seasonal. Summers are typically hot, and winters are cold and snowy.

18% of the land is forested, and 35% is cultivated. Wolves, foxes, squirrels and rabbits are among the most commonly spotted wild animals.

== Districts ==
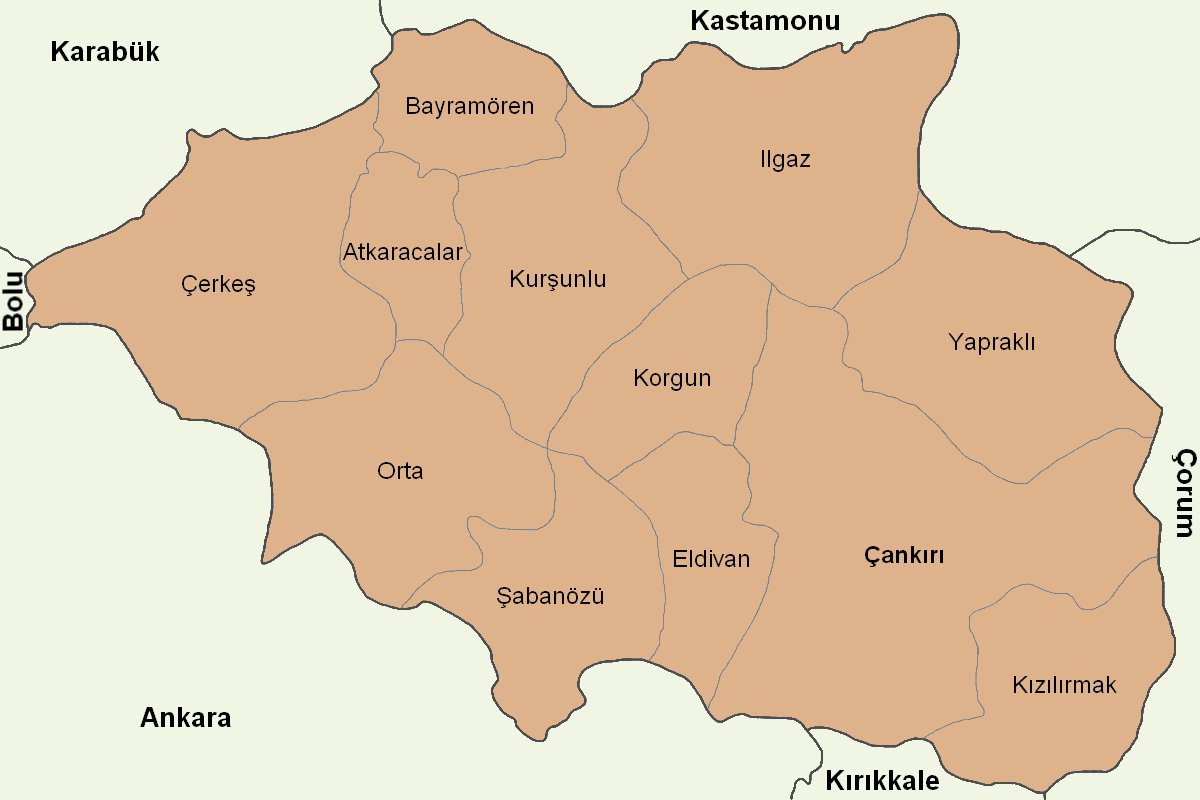

Çankırı province is divided into 12 districts (capital district in bold):

- Atkaracalar
- Bayramören
- **Çankırı**
- Çerkeş
- Eldivan
- Ilgaz
- Kızılırmak
- Korgun
- Kurşunlu
- Orta
- Şabanözü
- Yapraklı

== See also ==
- İnandıktepe
