= Pionia =

Pionia may refer to:

- Pionia (Mysia), an ancient city in the Troad and a suffragan see in the Roman Empire (see Cyzicus)
- Pionia (moth), synonym for the genus Correbia

== See also ==
- Paeonia (disambiguation)
- Piona
