= Kestros =

Kestros or Kaystros (Greek: Κέστρoς) may refer to:

- Kestros (weapon), a type of sling used to throw darts
- Kestros River, an ancient name of the Aksu River in Turkey
  - a god of said river
- Kestros (Cilicia), a town of ancient Cilicia, later in Isauria
- Kestros (Pamphylia), a town of ancient Pamphylia, later in Isauria
