= Çobanlar (disambiguation) =

Çobanlar can refer to:

- Çobanlar
- Çobanlar, Afyonkarahisar
- Çobanlar, Gazipaşa
- Çobanlar, İvrindi
- Çobanlar, Kargı
