= Gazipaşa =

- District and municipality
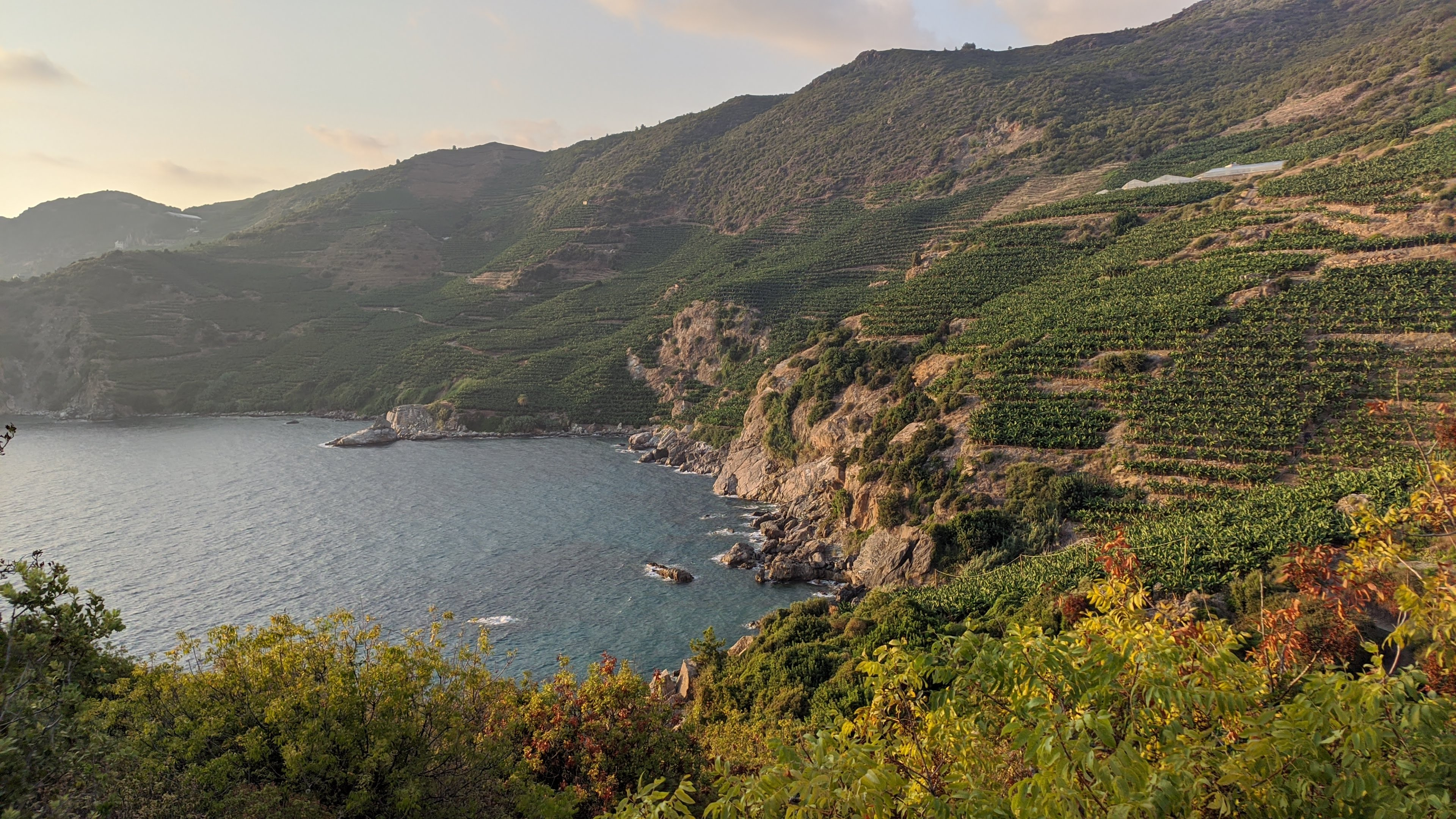
- Kral koyu, 'King's village' Gazipaşa, Antalya.

- Logo

- Map showing Gazipaşa District in Antalya Province

- Location within Turkey
- Coordinates: 36°16′22″N 32°18′47″E
- Country: Turkey
- Province: Antalya

Government
  - Mayor: Mehmet Ali Yılmaz (CHP)
- Area: 1,111 km^{2} (429 sq mi)
- Population (2022): 53,702
  - Density: 48.34/km^{2} (125.2/sq mi)
- Time zone: UTC+3 (TRT)
- Postal code: 07900
- Area code: 0242
- Website: www.gazipasa.bel.tr

Gazipaşa (Turkish pronunciation: [ɡaˈzipaʃa]) is a municipality and district of Antalya Province, Turkey. Its area is 1,111 km^{2}, and its population is 53,702 (2022). It is situated on the Mediterranean coast, 180 km east of the city of Antalya. Gazipaşa is a quiet rural district famous for its bananas and oranges. Gazipaşa district is adjacent to Alanya to the northwest, Sarıveliler to the north, Anamur to the east, and the Mediterranean Sea to the west.

== Geography ==
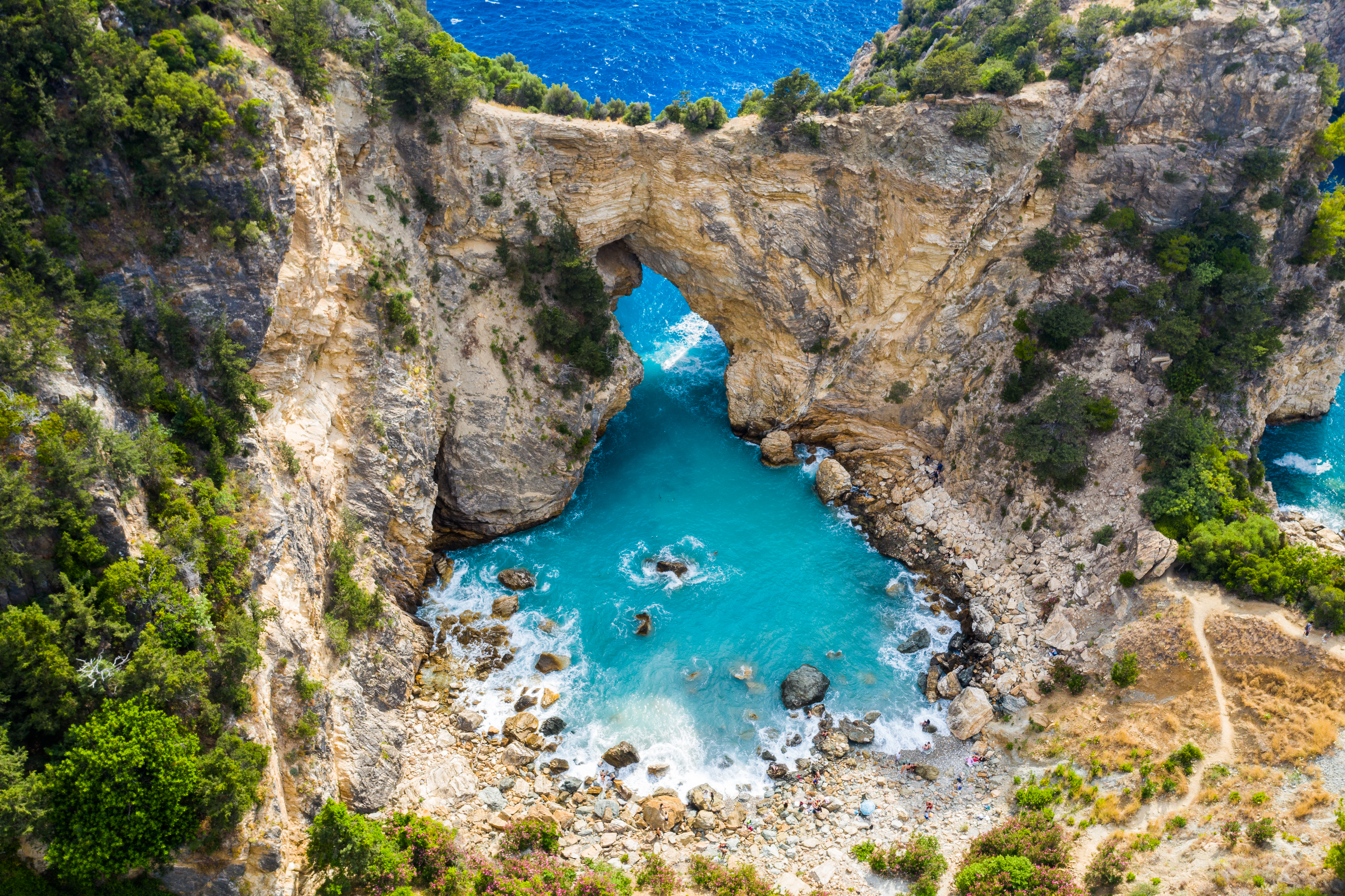
Pirates' Bay in Gazipaşa, Alanya.

The district of Gazipaşa stands on a narrow strip of coast between the Mediterranean Sea and the high Taurus Mountains rising steeply behind (highest point the 2253m "Deliktaş". Prehistoric animal remains (shelled sea animals) can be found at many locations in the mountains. Before these were the Taurus Mountains (Paleozoic Age) these peaks were below the sea. The coast road is winding Alanya, but good with four lanes in places making Gazipaşa easy to access from Antalya and Alanya. From Gazipaşa east the road is two lanes but in the process of being improved to four. It is 80 km to the next town Anamur which takes two hours to drive). The remote rocky hillsides are home to snakes, scorpions and other wildlife such as deer, rabbits, wild boar, wild sheep and badgers. There is 50 km of coastline, half of which is sandy beach and rocky stretches with small coves that can be used for swimming. The beaches of Gazipaşa are used as nesting grounds by loggerhead sea turtles. Construction is forbidden in these sea turtle areas.

The local economy depends on agriculture and the land of the coastal strip is used for growing fruits and vegetables, especially citrus fruits and bananas. The mountainous areas have many fruit orchards and in recent years a large number of glasshouses have been built to produce crops such as cucumbers, strawberries and artichokes all year round in both locations. Some grain is grown and there is also much animal husbandry animals in the summer these animals are grazed higher in the mountains. Gazipasa has a dam (Gökçeler Barajı). There is also some forestry and fishing but only small industry. Its current mayor is Mehmet Ali Yılmaz.

Gazipaşa has not experienced the tourist boom of neighbouring Alanya but there are efforts being made to attract tourists to the district by building a yacht marina and an international airport. Tourist attractions include some sites from antiquity, caves, beaches, and the opportunity for mountain walking or motor touring in the Taurus Mountains.

The Gazipaşa-Alanya Airport, opened in 2010, serves the tourist economies of Alanya, Anamur and Yeşilöz.

=== Climate ===
Gazipaşa has a hot-summer Mediterranean climate (Köppen: Csa), with very hot, dry summers, and mild winters with heavy rain.

Climate data for Gazipaşa (1991–2020)
Month	Jan	Feb	Mar	Apr	May	Jun	Jul	Aug	Sep	Oct	Nov	Dec	Year
Mean daily maximum °C (°F)	16.1 (61.0)	16.5 (61.7)	18.5 (65.3)	21.4 (70.5)	25.3 (77.5)	29.6 (85.3)	32.4 (90.3)	32.8 (91.0)	30.5 (86.9)	27.1 (80.8)	22.1 (71.8)	17.8 (64.0)	24.2 (75.6)
Daily mean °C (°F)	11.0 (51.8)	11.4 (52.5)	13.4 (56.1)	16.3 (61.3)	20.3 (68.5)	24.6 (76.3)	27.6 (81.7)	28.0 (82.4)	25.2 (77.4)	21.0 (69.8)	16.1 (61.0)	12.5 (54.5)	19.0 (66.2)
Mean daily minimum °C (°F)	7.1 (44.8)	7.1 (44.8)	8.6 (47.5)	11.2 (52.2)	15.1 (59.2)	19.1 (66.4)	22.2 (72.0)	22.8 (73.0)	19.8 (67.6)	15.7 (60.3)	11.4 (52.5)	8.6 (47.5)	14.1 (57.4)
Average precipitation mm (inches)	176.11 (6.93)	109.94 (4.33)	83.54 (3.29)	40.97 (1.61)	30.65 (1.21)	4.12 (0.16)	1.12 (0.04)	3.08 (0.12)	23.33 (0.92)	83.12 (3.27)	117.75 (4.64)	194.59 (7.66)	868.32 (34.19)
Average precipitation days (≥ 1.0 mm)	11.4	8.8	7.2	4.4	3.3	2.0	1	1.2	2.3	5.1	6.5	11.0	64.2
Average relative humidity (%)	64.7	64.1	66.3	68.6	68.4	64.0	62.3	63.5	62.0	61.8	62.9	66.3	64.6
Source: NOAA

== Composition ==
There are 53 neighbourhoods in Gazipaşa District:

- Akoluk
- Aydın
- Aydıncık
- Bakılar
- Beyobası
- Beyrebucak
- Çakmak
- Çalıpınar
- Çamlıca
- Çığlık
- Çile
- Çimenbağ
- Çobanlar
- Çörüş
- Cumhuriyet
- Doğanca
- Ekmel
- Esenpınar
- Esentepe
- Gazi
- Göçük
- Gökçebelen
- Gökçesaray
- Güneyköy
- Gürçam
- Hasdere
- Ilıcaköy
- İnalköy
- İnceğiz
- İstiklal
- Kahyalar
- Karaçukur
- Karalar
- Karatepe
- Kırahmetler
- Kızılgüney
- Koru
- Korubaşı
- Küçüklü
- Macarköy
- Muzkent
- Öznurtepe
- Pazarcı
- Şahinler
- Sarıağaç
- Sugözü
- Üçkonak
- Yakacık
- Yeni
- Yenigüney
- Yeniköy
- Yeşilyurt
- Zeytinada

== History ==
This is a part of the world with a long history, and there is evidence of Hittite settlement going back to 2000 BC, and it is assumed that this coast was settled long before that. The Ancient Greek city of Selinus was established here on the River Kestros (today called Hacımusa) by 628 BC, as part of the kingdom of Cilicia. In 197 BC the area passed into the hands of the Ancient Romans, and in the 2nd century AD the Emperor Trajan died here after falling ill while journeying along the Mediterranean coast. His body was taken by his successor Hadrian for burial in Rome and for a period the town was named Traianapolis.

The later Roman Empire (Byzantine Empire) continued to rule the area until it was taken by the Armenian Kingdom of Cilicia who lost the area to the Seljuk Turks of `Ala' ad-Din Kay-Qubad in 1225. Selinus was retaken briefly by Armenians before the conquest of Karamanids in the end of the 13th century. During the area of the Anatolian beyliks the coast including Selinti was controlled by the Karamanid clan of Konya and was brought into the Ottoman Empire in 1472 by Gedik Ahmet Pasha, naval commander of Sultan Mehmet II. The 17th century traveller Evliya Çelebi records Selinti as a group of 26 villages, with a well-kept mosque on the seafront along with a jetty for boats to Cyprus, and green mountains behind.

Archaeological research continues and in 2004 a team from Florida State University found a small bronze statue of Pegasus dating back to 300 BC in the waters off Gazipaşa; it is now in the Museum of Alanya.

We can list the castles in Gazipaşa as Selinus, Iotape, Lamos (Adanda), Nephelis and Antiochia ad Cragum.

== International relations ==
Gazipaşa is twinned with:

- Brønnøysund, Norway
- Virovitica, Croatia

== Gallery of various scenes ==
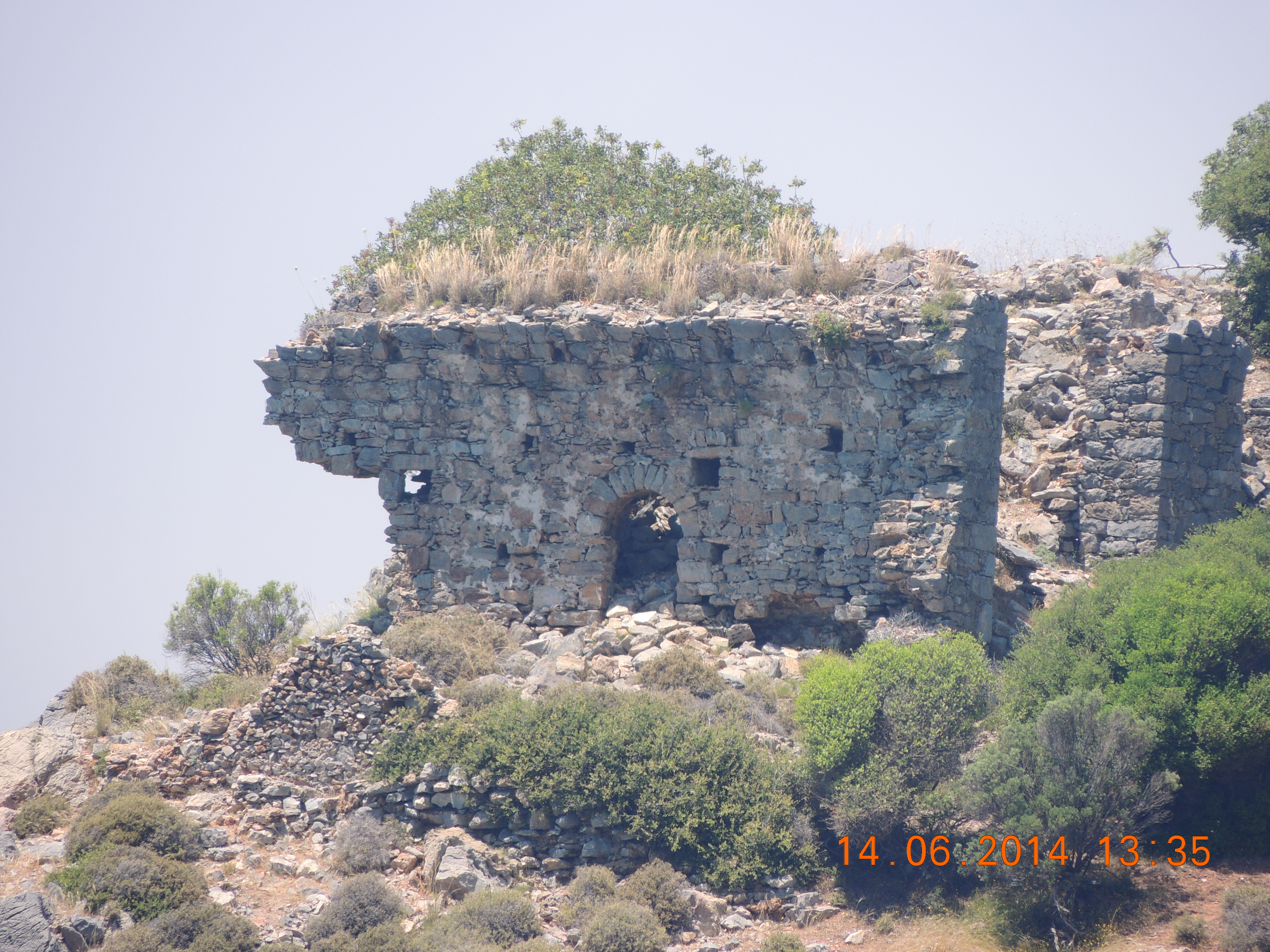
Ruins

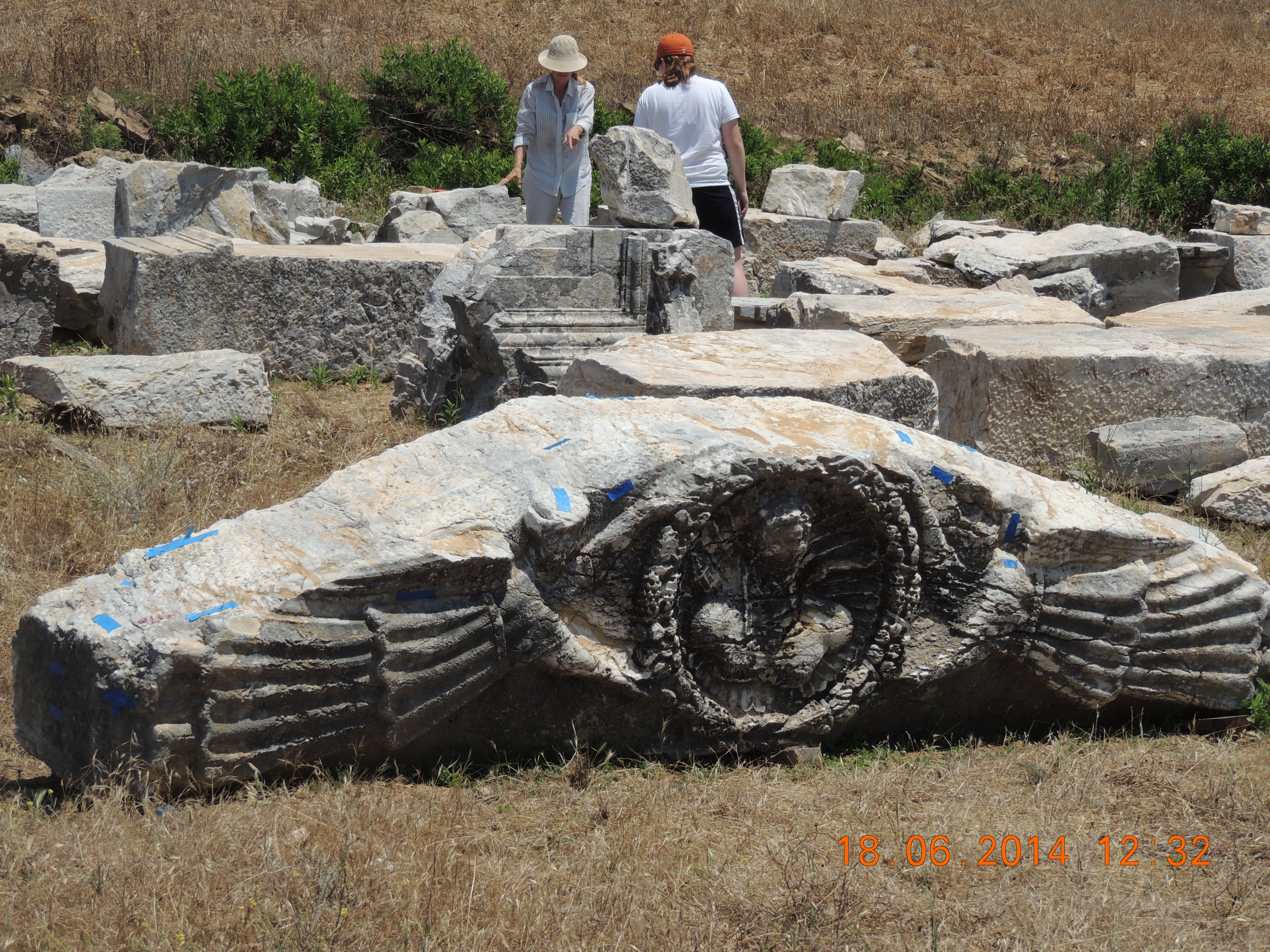
More ruins

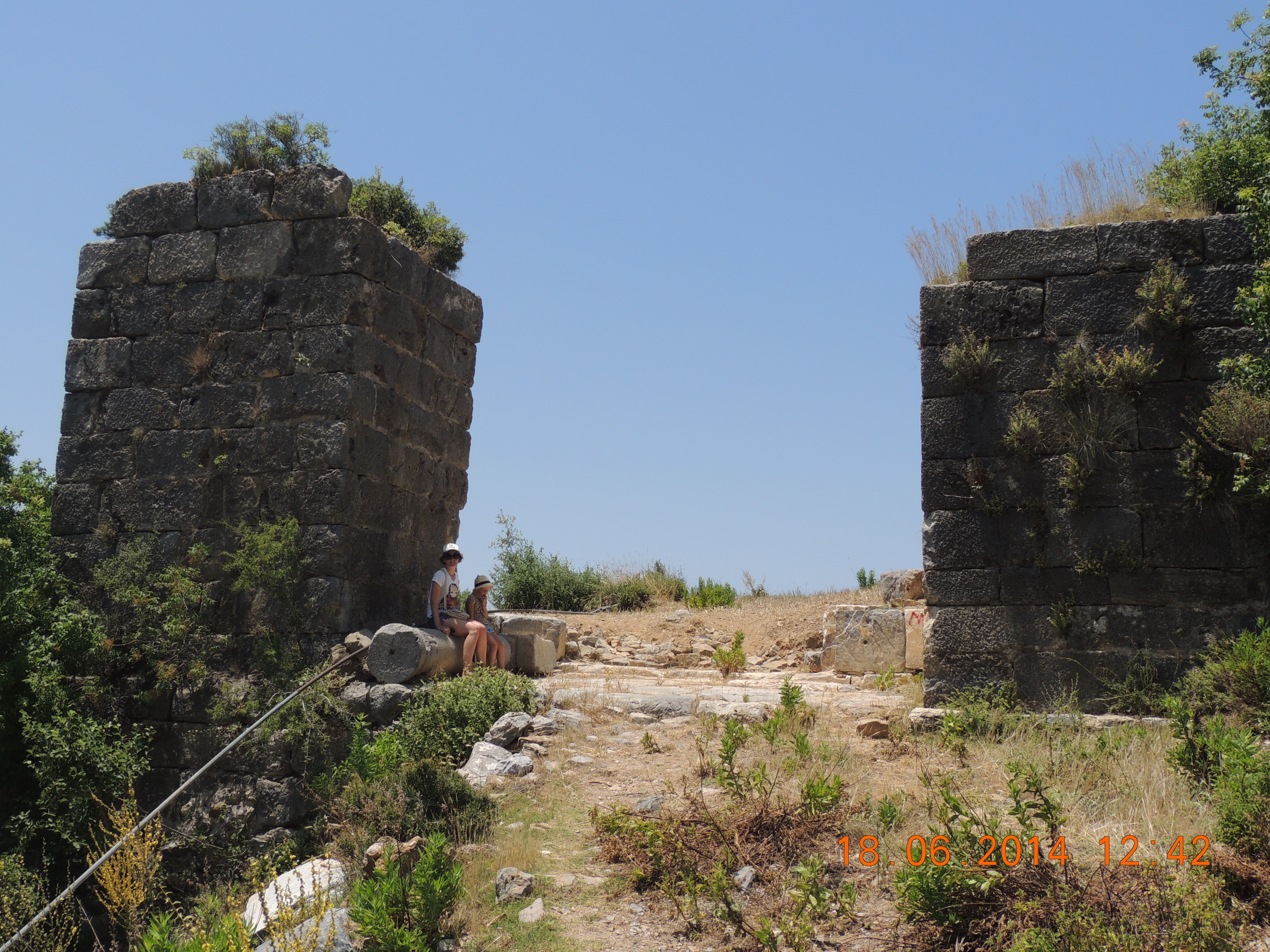
Even more ruins

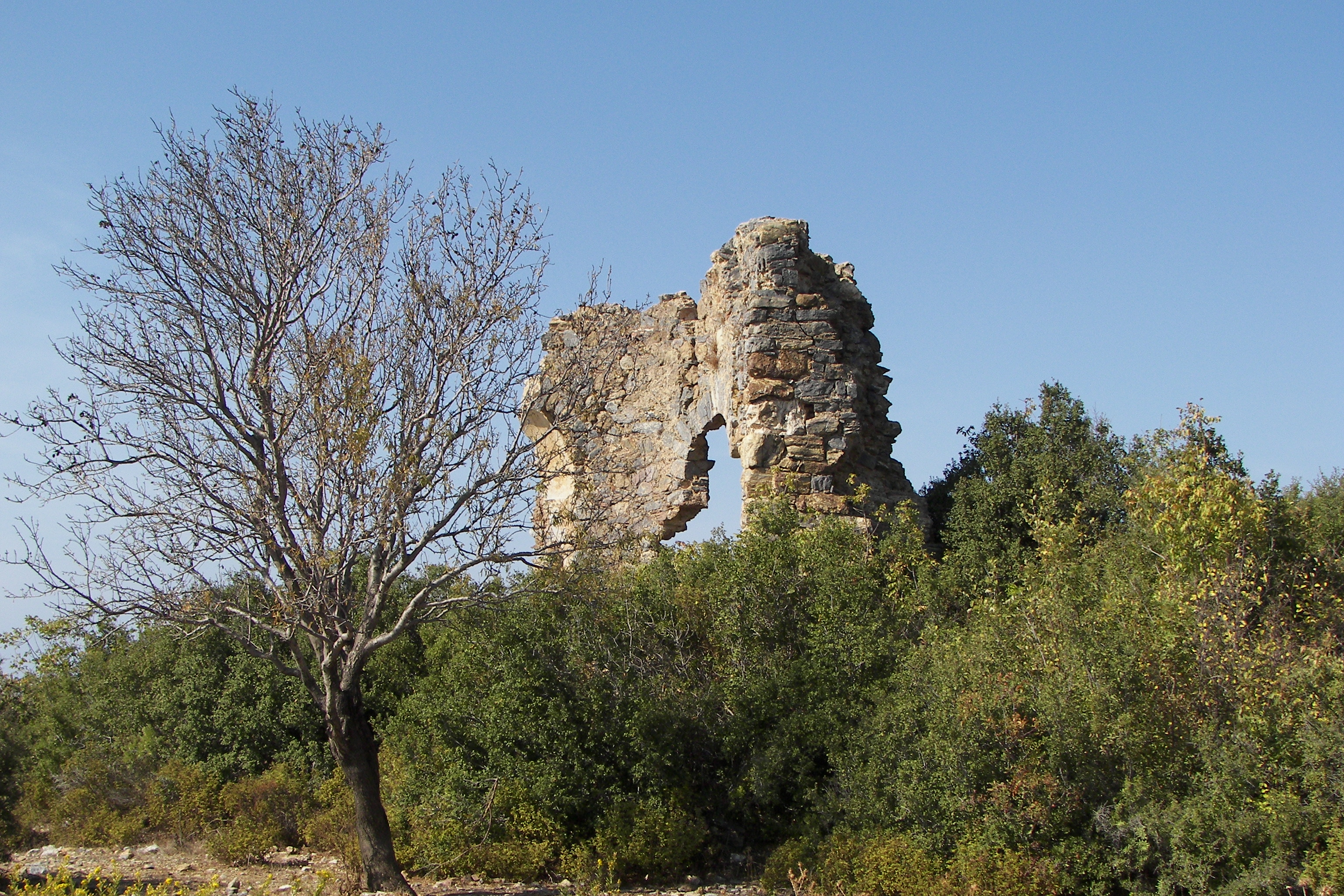
Yet more ruins

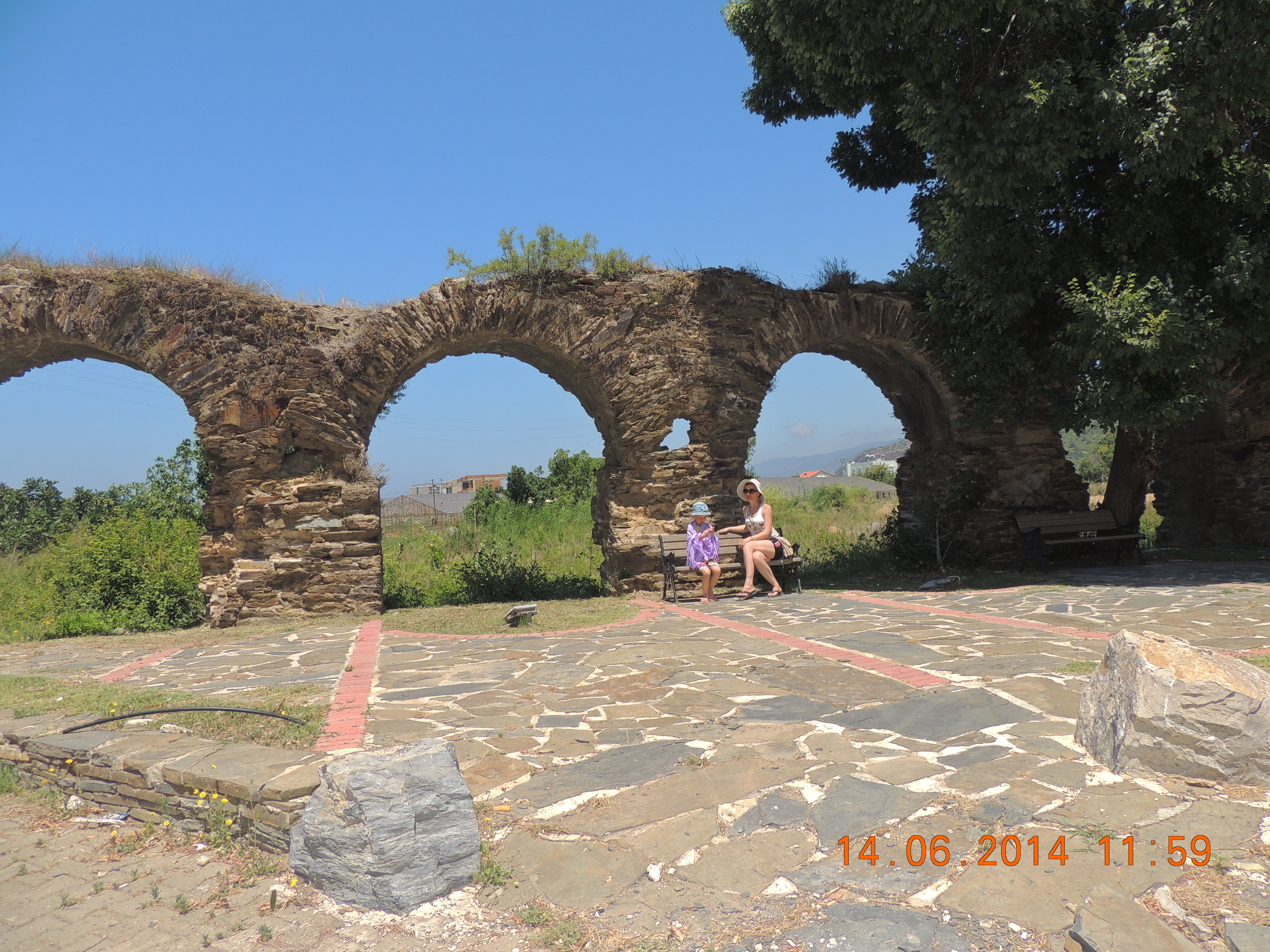
Roman aqueduct ruins

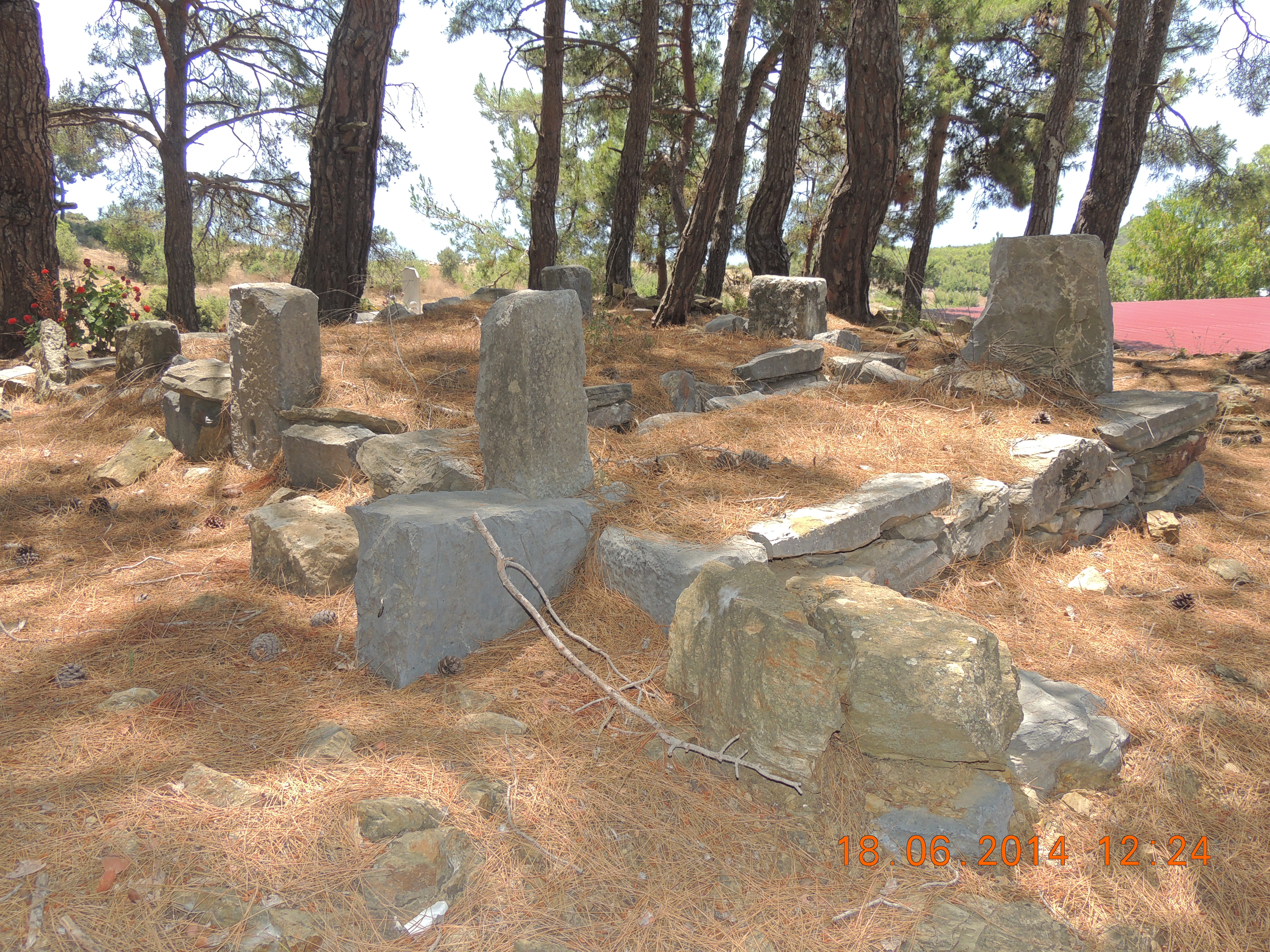
Roman graves

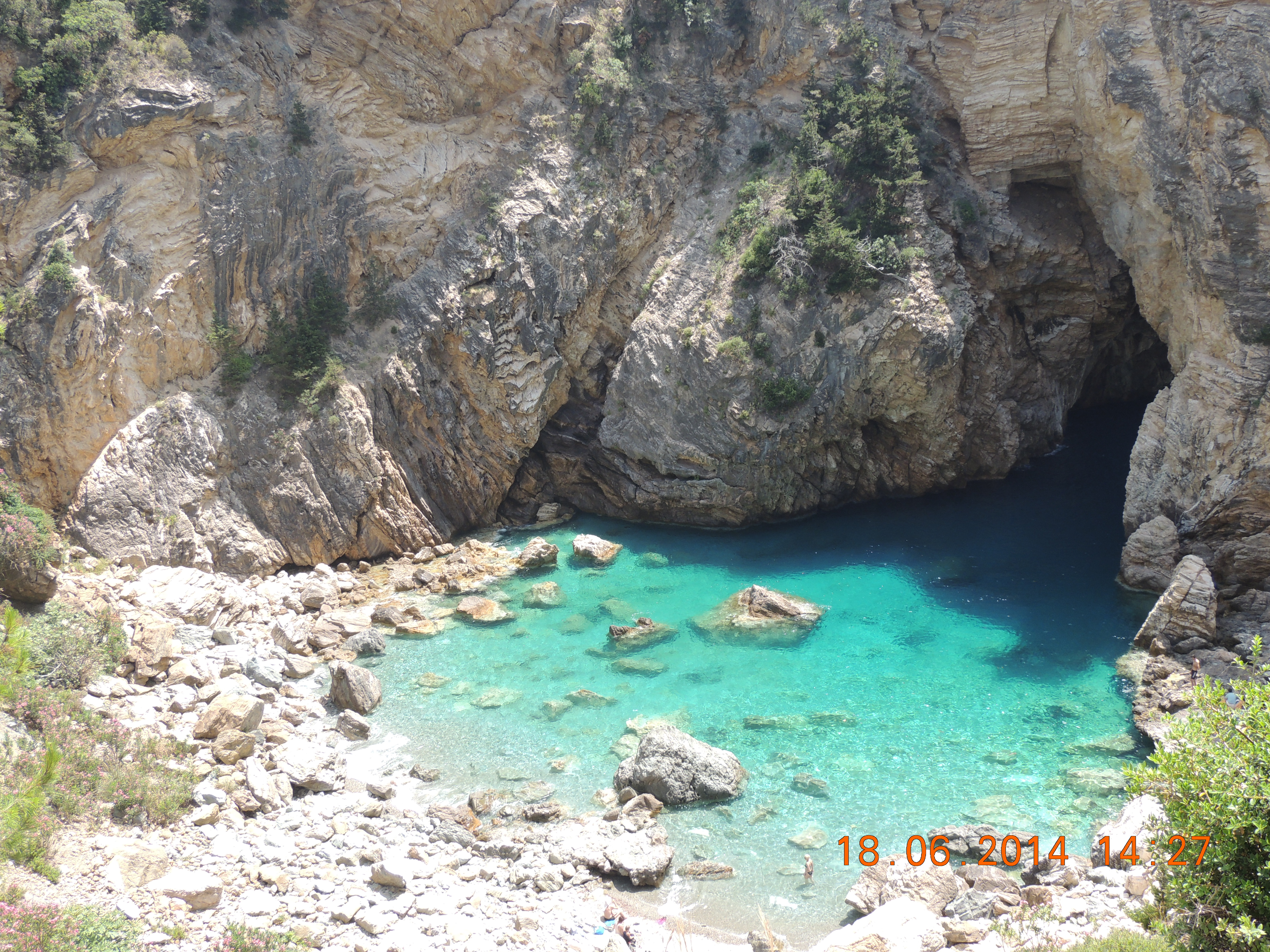
Emerald Lagoon

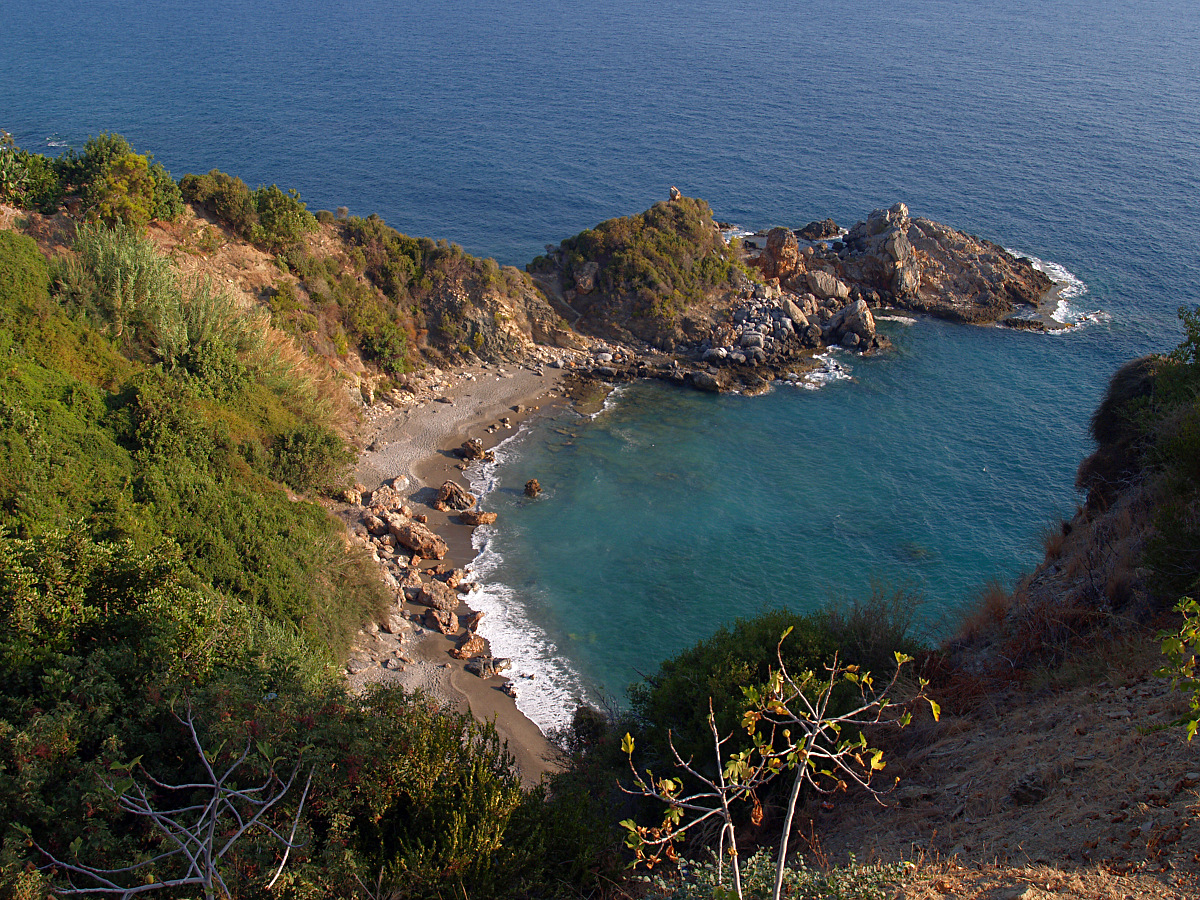

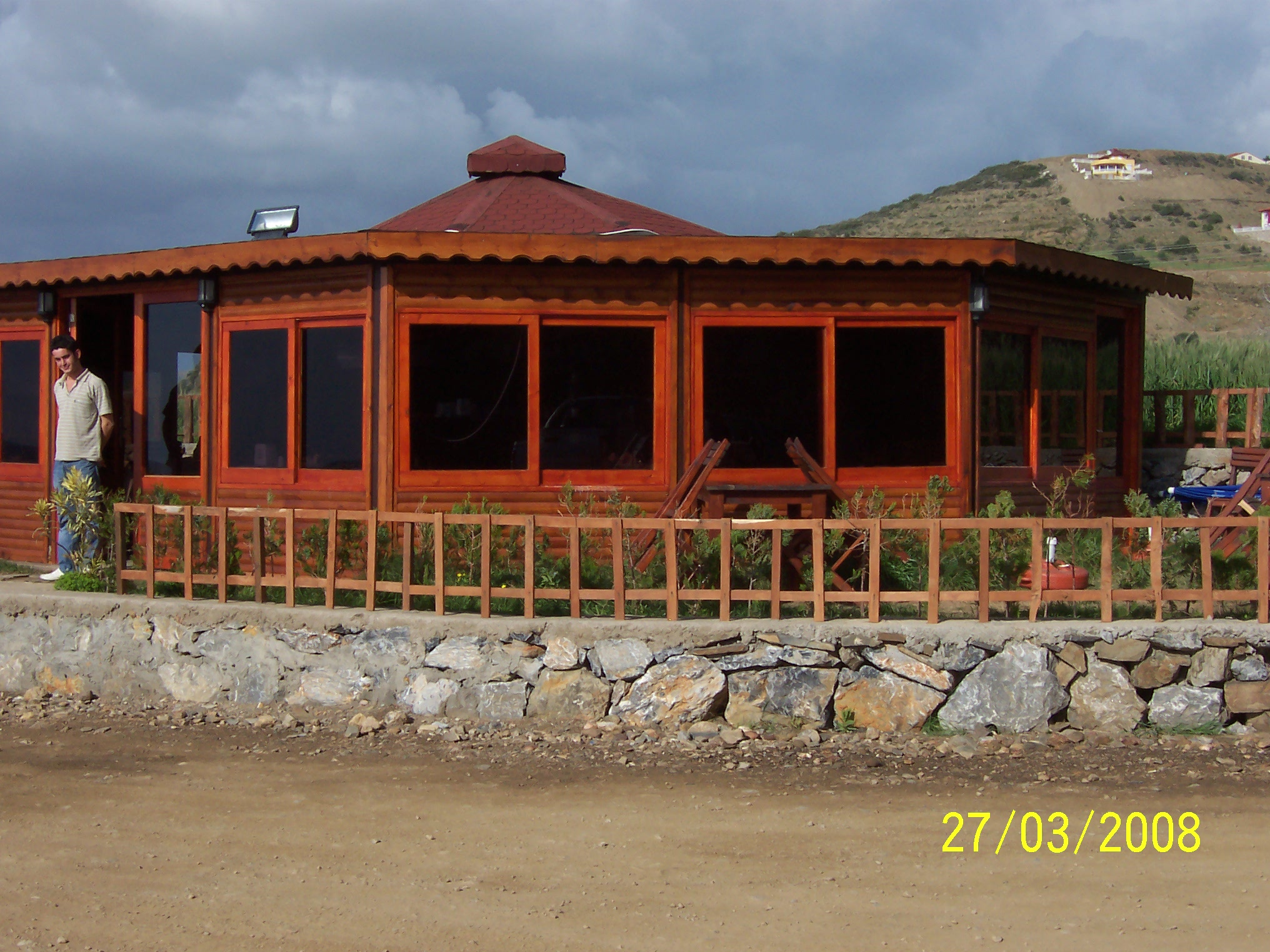
A coastal restaurant

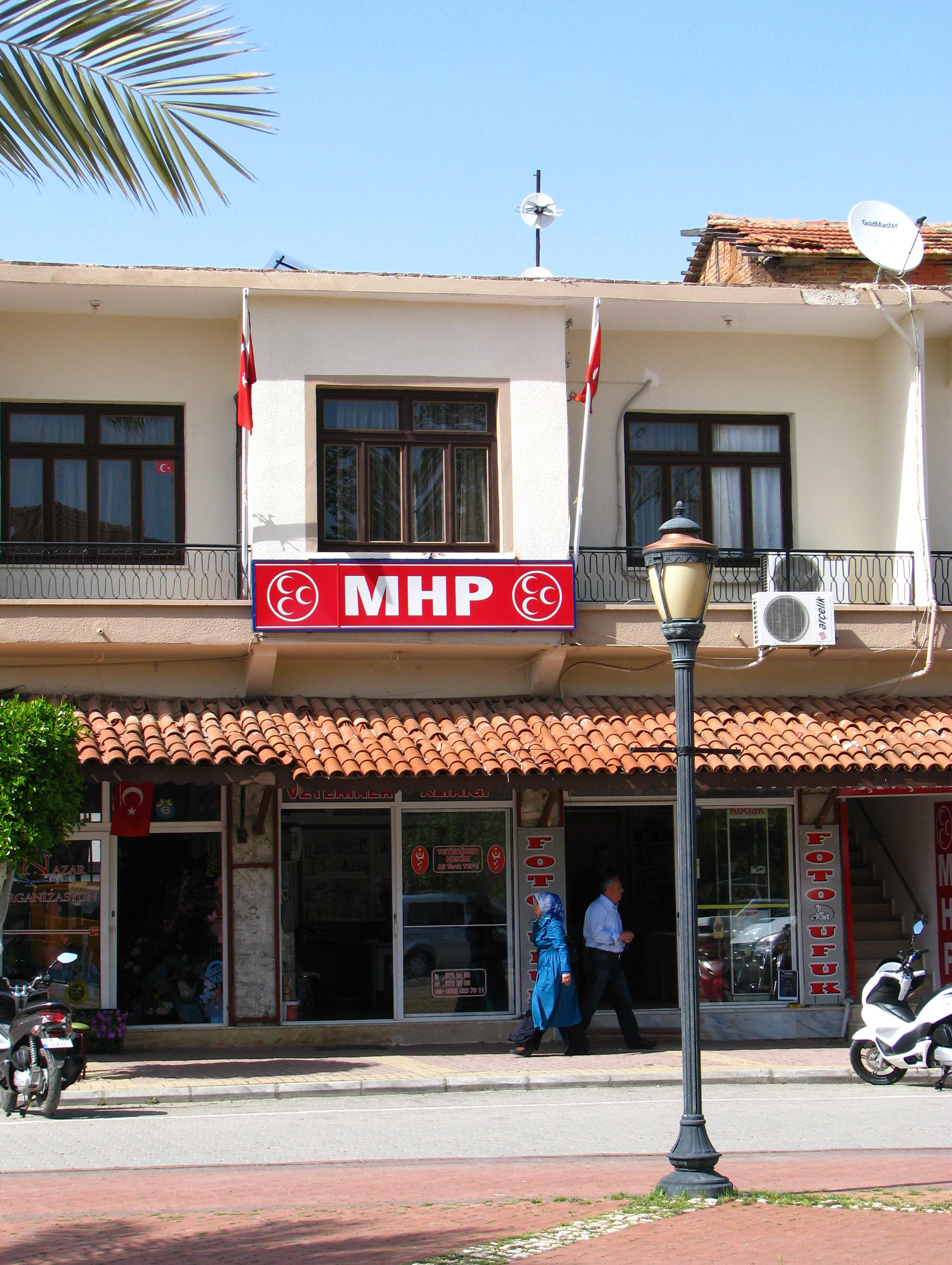
Nationalist Movement Party office

== Notable residents ==
- Ahmet Arslan (born 1986), athlete
