= Haydarköy =

Haydarköy can refer to the following villages in Turkey:

- Haydarköy, Alaca
- Haydarköy, İvrindi
- Haydarköy, Mut
