= Çukuroba =

Çukuroba can refer to:

- Çukuroba, İvrindi
- Çukuroba, Yenice
- Çukuroba, Kilis
