= Kaystros =

Unlocated town of ancient Cilicia

Coordinates: 36°14′11″N 32°19′46″E

Kaystros or Kestros was a town of ancient Cilicia and later of Isauria inhabited during Roman and Byzantine times. Its relationship with Cestrus, a titular bishopric, otherwise unlocated is not clear.

Its site is located near Kilisebeleni, Macar, in Asiatic Turkey.
