= Yaren (disambiguation) =

Yaren is a district and the de facto capital of Nauru.

Yaren may also refer to:

== Given name ==
- Yaren Berfe Göker (born 1999), Turkish female handball player
- Yaren Sözer (born 1997), Australian professional footballer of Turkish descent

== Surname ==
- Aylin Yaren (born 1989), a Turkish-German female soccer player

== Other uses ==
- Yaren Constituency, an electoral constituency of Nauru
- Yaren, İvrindi, a village in Turkey
- Yaren (stork), a stork popularly known for its friendship with a fisherman in Turkey.
