= Kayapa, İvrindi =

Town in Balıkesir, Turkey

Kayapa is a town (officially a neighborhood) in the İvrindi District, Balıkesir Province, Turkey. It is located approximately 15 kilometers southwest of the town of İvrindi. Its population is 1,733 (2012). In the past, each household in the town included at least one potter, so the place was known as Desti Diyarı ("Jug Land").

== Geography ==
The town's altitude is approximately 400 meters above sea level. The terrain around the town is mountainous, geologically volcanic and sedimentary formations of the Neogene. The town is north of Taşoluk Creek; the valley of the creek is the main agricultural area in the area of the town. Clay deposits 2-3 kilometers northeast of the town are used for pottery making. The raw clay is almost black, but fires to red.

Average annual temperature is 12.8 °C, with January the coldest month and July the warmest. Average annual rainfall is 680.3 millimeters, with the most rainfall in January and the least in August.

== History ==
The people of Kayapa reportedly first settled in a place called Dölağılı. After a war, two beys from that village settled their people in two separate places. These two villages eventually merged and became known as Ören. When Ören was struck by a disease called çarıkçıkartmaz (cholera), however, its people moved to what is now Kayapa.

Kayapa was part of the Kaza of İvrindi in 1530.

Between 1891 and 1893, the Kayapa Mosque was renovated and decorated.

In July 1920, during the Turkish War of Independence,the Greek army occupied Kayapa. Skirmishes took place in and around the village. In September 1922, the Greeks abandoned the village.

In 1929, Kayapa became part of the newly established (Bucak) of Osmanköy. However, in 1934, the center of this bucak was moved to Kayapa. In 1991, Kayapa was made a municipality (belediye).

== Economy ==
The town's economy relies on dryland farming, mainly tobacco and grapes, and on clay products such as bricks and pottery.

=== Ceramics ===
The town's workshops produce ceramic items. Local names for these items include

- bardak (jug, literally "cup")
- emzikli bardak (jug with spout, literally "nippled cup")
- emziksiz bardak (jug without spout, literally "nipple-less cup")
- coptan destisi (small jug, literally more or less "jug of twig")
- Balıkesir işi (large jug, literally "Balıkesir work")

=== Festival ===
The town hosts an annual "Traditional Kayapa Jug and Cornelian Cherry Festival" (Geleneksel Kayapa Desti ve Kızılcık Festivali). The festival includes an oil wrestling tournament.
