= Değirmenbaşı =

Değirmenbaşı can refer to:

- Değirmenbaşı, Düzce
- Değirmenbaşı, İvrindi
