= Akçal =

Akçal can refer to the following villages in Turkey:

- Akçal, İvrindi
- Akçal, Tufanbeyli
