= İkizce (disambiguation) =

İkizce is a town and district of Ordu Province, Turkey.

İkizce may also refer to:

- İkizce, Bilecik, a village in the district of Bilecik, Bilecik Province, Turkey
- İkizce, Gölbaşı, a neighborhood of the district of Gölbaşı, Ankara Province, Turkey
- İkizce, İvrindi, a village
- İkizce, Kahta, a village in the district of Kahta, Adıyaman Province, Turkey
- İkizce, Kaş, a village in the district of Kaş, Antalya Province, Turkey
- İkizce, Laçin
