= Hacıahmetler =

Hacıahmetler can refer to the following villages in Turkey:

- Hacıahmetler, Düzce
- Hacıahmetler, İvrindi
- Hacıahmetler, Mengen
