= Erdel =

Erdel is the historical name of Transylvania in Turkish.

Erdel may also refer to:

== People ==
- Cavit Erdel, Turkish military officer
- Christina Erdel, German figure skater
- Zsolt Erdel, Hungarian former professional boxer
- Saul Erdel, a fictitious character created by DC Comics
- Mete Erdel, is a music producer from Netherlands. Official website: Erdel.com

== Places ==
- Erdel, İvrindi, a village
- Principality of Transylvania, also known as "Erdel Voyvodalığı" in Turkish
- Erdel (Erdèl) is the name in the Bergamasque dialect of the village Verdello, located in the province of Bergamo (Italy).

== See also ==
- Transylvania (disambiguation)
