= Pelitören =

Pelitören can refer to the following villages in Turkey:

- Pelitören, İvrindi
- Pelitören, Sındırgı
