= Kocaoba =

Kocaoba can refer to the following villages in Turkey:

- Kocaoba, Dikili
- Kocaoba, İvrindi
