= Göçük =

Göçük (literally "landslide" in Turkish) may refer to:

- Göçük, Gazipaşa, a village in Gazipaşa district of Antalya Province, Turkey
- Göçük, Tarsus, a village in Tarsus district of Mersin Province, Turkey
