= Mallıca =

Mallıca can refer to the following villages in Turkey:

- Mallıca, Bayat
- Mallıca, İvrindi
