= Nephelis =

Town in ancient Cilicia

Coordinates: 36°10′31″N 32°22′58″E

Nephelis (Ancient Greek: Νεφελίς) was a small town of ancient Cilicia, situated, according to Ptolemy, between Antioch and Anemurium; but if, as some suppose, it be the same place as the Zephelium or Zephelion (Ζεφέλιον) mentioned in the Stadiasmus Maris Magni, it ought to be looked for between Selinus and Celenderis. Near the place was a promontory of the same name, where, according to Livy, the fleet of Antiochus the Great was stationed, when, after reducing the towns of Cilicia as far as Selinus, he was engaged in the siege of Coracesium, and where he received the ambassadors of the Rhodians.

Its site is tentatively located near Kicikköy, Muzkent, in Asiatic Turkey.
