= İnceğiz =

İnceğiz can refer to:

- Battle of İnceğiz
- Cave monastery of İnceğiz
- İnceğiz, Gazipaşa
- İnceğiz, Kale
- İnceğiz, Kazan
- İnceğiz, Kızılcahamam
