= Correbia elongatus =

Scientific classification
- Domain: Eukaryota
- Kingdom: Animalia
- Phylum: Arthropoda
- Class: Insecta
- Order: Lepidoptera
- Superfamily: Noctuoidea
- Family: Erebidae
- Subfamily: Arctiinae
- Genus: Correbia
- Species: C. elongatus

Binomial name
- Correbia elongatus (Dognin, 1890)

Synonyms
- Chloropsinus elongatus Dognin, 1890; Correbia elongatus f. boliviana Rothschild, 1912; Correbia intermedia Draudt, 1915

Species of moth

Correbia elongatus is a moth of the subfamily Arctiinae. It was described by Paul Dognin in 1890. It is found in Ecuador.
