= İvrindi =

- District and municipality
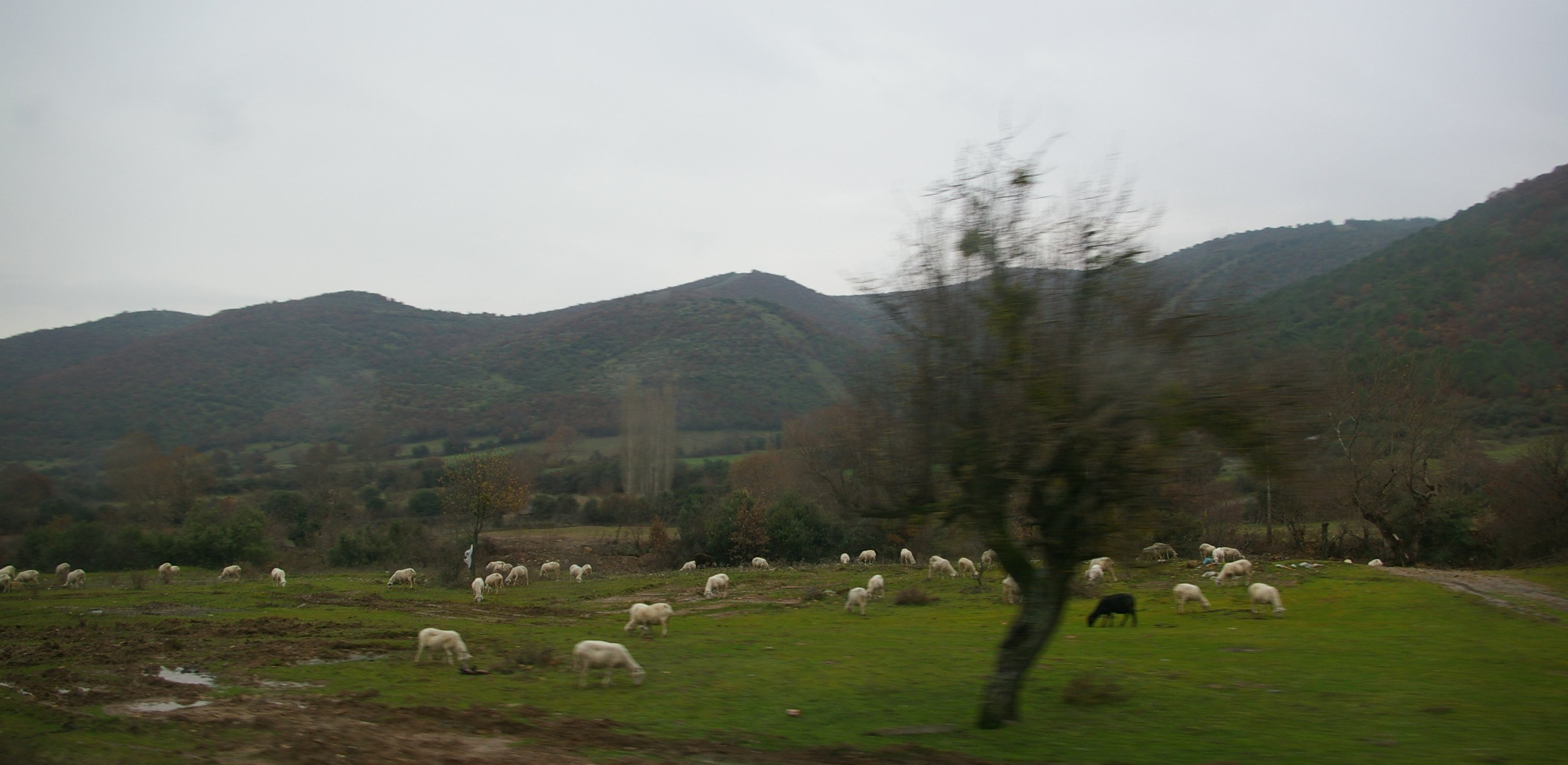
- İvrindi countryside

- Map showing İvrindi District in Balıkesir Province

- Location within Turkey Location within Marmara
- Coordinates: 39°35′N 27°29′E
- Country: Turkey
- Province: Balıkesir

Government
  - Mayor: Önder Lapanta (İYİ)
- Area: 818 km^{2} (316 sq mi)
- Population (2022): 31,512
  - Density: 38.5/km^{2} (99.8/sq mi)
- Time zone: UTC+3 (TRT)
- Area code: 0266
- Website: www.ivrindi.bel.tr

İvrindi is a municipality and district of Balıkesir Province, Turkey. Its area is 818 km^{2}, and its population is 31,512 (2022). The mayor is Önder Lapanta (İYİ).

== Composition ==
There are 69 neighbourhoods in İvrindi District:

- Akçal
- Aşağıoba
- Ayaklı
- Bedrettin
- Bozören
- Büyükfındık
- Büyükılıca
- Büyükyenice
- Çarkacı
- Çatalan
- Çelimler
- Çiçekli
- Çobanlar
- Çukurlar
- Çukuroba
- Değirmenbaşı
- Demirciler
- Döşeme
- Erdel
- Eriklikömürcü
- Evciler
- Gebeçınar
- Geçmiş
- Gökçeler
- Gökçeyazı
- Gömeniç
- Gözlüçayır
- Gümeli
- Hacıahmetler
- Haydarköy
- Hüseyinbeyobası
- İkizce
- Ilıcakpınar
- Kaleoba
- Karaçebiş
- Kaşağıl
- Kayapa
- Kılcılar
- Kınaköy
- Kınık
- Kıpıklar
- Kiraz Ören
- Kışladere
- Kocaeli
- Kocaoba
- Korucu
- Küçükfındık
- Küçükılıca
- Küçükyenice
- Kurtuluş
- Kuşdere
- Mallıca
- Okçular
- Osmanköy
- Osmanlar
- Pelitören
- Sakarya
- Sarıca
- Sarıpınar
- Sofular
- Soğanbükü
- Susuzyayla
- Taşdibi
- Topuzlar
- Yağlılar
- Yaren
- Yedieylül
- Yeşilköy
- Yürekli
