= Kocaeli, İvrindi =

Village in Turkey

Kocaeli
- Neighbourhood
- Location in Turkey Kocaeli (Marmara)
- Coordinates: 39.624°N 27.513°E
- Country: Turkey
- Province: Balıkesir
- District: İvrindi
- Population (2022): 602
- Time zone: UTC+3 (TRT)

Kocaeli is a neighbourhood in the municipality and district of İvrindi, Balıkesir Province in Turkey. Its population is 602 (2022), and it has a postal code of 10770.
