= Yeşilöz, Alanya =

Yeşilöz
- Neighbourhood
- Location in Turkey
- Coordinates: 36°23′17″N 32°11′41″E
- Country: Turkey
- Province: Antalya
- District: Alanya
- Population (2022): 1,270
- Time zone: UTC+3 (TRT)

Yeşilöz (previously Domalan) is a neighbourhood in the municipality and district of Alanya, Antalya Province, Turkey. Its population is 1,270 (2022). It is a beach resort village on the south Mediterranean coast. Yeşilöz has a large sandy beach that stretches for about 3 km. There are several small shops, a variety of restaurants, a barber, 2 hotels and some of Turkey's most exclusive private villas.

Situated on the coast road between the Alanya town center and Antalya Gazipaşa Airport, the village also has a regular bus service. The buses run every 15 minutes and are available from early morning until late night. The road is dotted with fish restaurants, hotels, and shops. Many of the restaurants along the beach have private sections of the beaches reserved for guests.

Yeşilöz is about 15 minutes from Gazipaşa going south and 15 minutes from Alanya going north. The new international airport, Gazipaşa Airport, is 15 minutes from Yeşilöz.

There are major development plans for a golf course above Yeşilöz.

The Taurus Mountains behind the village are the source of the river that flows into the sea, and the mountains are covered with trees planted by the Turkish government. The main economic activities are farming and tourism, and the village is in a protected development area which has restricted all developments to single villas.

Yeşilöz is one of the destinations of the boat trips from Alanya's harbour, with boats anchoring in the inlets and coves up the coast towards Gazipaşa.
