= Correbia rufescens =

Scientific classification
- Domain: Eukaryota
- Kingdom: Animalia
- Phylum: Arthropoda
- Class: Insecta
- Order: Lepidoptera
- Superfamily: Noctuoidea
- Family: Erebidae
- Subfamily: Arctiinae
- Genus: Correbia
- Species: C. rufescens

Binomial name
- Correbia rufescens Rothschild, 1912

Species of moth

Correbia rufescens is a moth of the subfamily Arctiinae. It was described by Rothschild in 1912. It is found in Colombia.

== Subspecies ==
- Correbia rufescens rufescens
- Correbia rufescens colombiana Zerny, 1931 (Colombia)

Note: Some sources consider Correbia rufescens colombiana a separate species, Correibia colombiana
