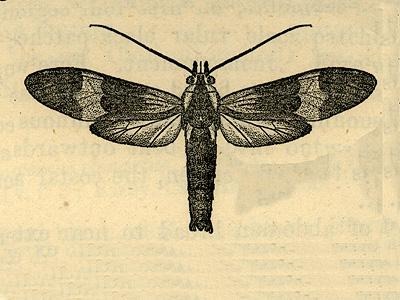

Scientific classification
- Kingdom: Animalia
- Phylum: Arthropoda
- Class: Insecta
- Order: Lepidoptera
- Superfamily: Noctuoidea
- Family: Erebidae
- Subfamily: Arctiinae
- Genus: Correbia
- Species: C. lycoides

Binomial name
- Correbia lycoides (Walker, 1854)

Synonyms
- Euchormia lycoides Walker, 1854; Pionia lycoides; Correbia ceramboides Herrich-Schäffer, [1855]

= Correbia lycoides =

Tiger bug mimic

Species of moth

Correbia lycoides, the tiger bug mimic, is a moth of the subfamily Arctiinae. It was described by Francis Walker in 1854. It is found in Mexico, Honduras, Panama, the amazon biome from Guyana to southern Brazil and Peru and on Cuba and Jamaica.

Adults mimic certain wasps and heteropteran bugs. They are active during the day, but also fly at night.
