= İnalköy, Gazipaşa =

İnalköy
- Neighbourhood
- Location in Turkey
- Coordinates: 36.1342°N 32.5397°E
- Country: Turkey
- Province: Antalya
- District: Gazipaşa
- Population (2022): 236
- Time zone: UTC+3 (TRT)

İnalköy is a neighbourhood in the municipality and district of Gazipaşa, Antalya Province, Turkey. Its population is 236 (2022).
