= Kızılgüney, Gazipaşa =

Kızılgüney
- Neighbourhood
- Country: Turkey
- Province: Antalya
- District: Gazipaşa
- Population (2022): 484
- Time zone: UTC+3 (TRT)

Kızılgüney is a neighbourhood in the municipality and district of Gazipaşa, Antalya Province, Turkey. Its population is 484 (2022).
