= Correbia tristitia =

Scientific classification
- Domain: Eukaryota
- Kingdom: Animalia
- Phylum: Arthropoda
- Class: Insecta
- Order: Lepidoptera
- Superfamily: Noctuoidea
- Family: Erebidae
- Subfamily: Arctiinae
- Genus: Correbia
- Species: C. tristitia

Binomial name
- Correbia tristitia Kaye, 1911

Synonyms
- Correbia klagesi Rothschild, 1912

Species of moth

Correbia tristitia is a moth of the subfamily Arctiinae. It was described by William James Kaye in 1911. It is found in Guyana.
