= Çimenbağ, Gazipaşa =

Çimenbağ
- Neighbourhood
- Location in Turkey
- Coordinates: 36°15′57″N 32°28′54″E
- Country: Turkey
- Province: Antalya
- District: Gazipaşa
- Population (2022): 105
- Time zone: UTC+3 (TRT)

Çimenbağ is a neighbourhood in the municipality and district of Gazipaşa, Antalya Province, Turkey. Its population is 105 (2022).
