= Topuzlar, İvrindi =

Village in Turkey

Topuzlar
- Neighbourhood
- Location in Turkey Topuzlar (Marmara)
- Coordinates: 39.604°N 27.411°E
- Country: Turkey
- Province: Balıkesir
- District: İvrindi
- Population (2022): 473
- Time zone: UTC+3 (TRT)

Topuzlar is a neighbourhood in the municipality and district of İvrindi, Balıkesir Province in Turkey. Its population is 473 (2022).
