= Yağlılar, İvrindi =

Village in Turkey

Yağlılar
- Neighbourhood
- Location in Turkey Yağlılar (Marmara)
- Coordinates: 39.551°N 27.482°E
- Country: Turkey
- Province: Balıkesir
- District: İvrindi
- Population (2022): 767
- Time zone: UTC+3 (TRT)

Yağlılar is a neighbourhood in the municipality and district of İvrindi, Balıkesir Province in Turkey. Its population is 767 (2022).
