= Küçüklü, Gazipaşa =

Küçüklü
- Neighbourhood
- Location in Turkey
- Coordinates: 36.3077°N 32.3503°E
- Country: Turkey
- Province: Antalya
- District: Gazipaşa
- Population (2022): 605
- Time zone: UTC+3 (TRT)

Küçüklü is a neighbourhood in the municipality and district of Gazipaşa, Antalya Province, Turkey. Its population is 605 (2022).
