= Beyobası, Gazipaşa =

Beyobası
- Neighbourhood
- Location in Turkey
- Coordinates: 36.2813°N 32.3377°E
- Country: Turkey
- Province: Antalya
- District: Gazipaşa
- Population (2022): 2,210
- Time zone: UTC+3 (TRT)

Beyobası is a neighbourhood in the municipality and district of Gazipaşa, Antalya Province, Turkey. Its population is 2,210 (2022).
