= Büyükılıca, İvrindi =

Village in Turkey

Büyükılıca
- Neighbourhood
- Location in Turkey Büyükılıca (Marmara)
- Coordinates: 39.481°N 27.330°E
- Country: Turkey
- Province: Balıkesir
- District: İvrindi
- Population (2022): 232
- Time zone: UTC+3 (TRT)

Büyükılıca is a neighbourhood in the municipality and district of İvrindi, Balıkesir Province in Turkey. Its population is 232 (2022).
