= Karaçukur, Gazipaşa =

Karaçukur
- Neighbourhood
- Location in Turkey
- Coordinates: 36.2797°N 32.4067°E
- Country: Turkey
- Province: Antalya
- District: Gazipaşa
- Population (2022): 135
- Time zone: UTC+3 (TRT)

Karaçukur is a neighbourhood in the municipality and district of Gazipaşa, Antalya Province, Turkey. Its population is 135 (2022).
