= Yeşilköy, İvrindi =

Village in Turkey

Yeşilköy
- Neighbourhood
- Location in Turkey Yeşilköy (Marmara)
- Coordinates: 39.623°N 27.473°E
- Country: Turkey
- Province: Balıkesir
- District: İvrindi
- Population (2022): 131
- Time zone: UTC+3 (TRT)

Yeşilköy is a neighbourhood in the municipality and district of İvrindi, Balıkesir Province in Turkey. Its population is 131 (2022).
