= Kınık, İvrindi =

Village in Turkey

Kınık
- Neighbourhood
- Location in Turkey Kınık (Marmara)
- Coordinates: 39.580°N 27.552°E
- Country: Turkey
- Province: Balıkesir
- District: İvrindi
- Population (2022): 385
- Time zone: UTC+3 (TRT)

Kınık is a neighbourhood in the municipality and district of İvrindi, Balıkesir Province in Turkey. Its population is 385 (2022).
