= Correbia punctigera =

Scientific classification
- Domain: Eukaryota
- Kingdom: Animalia
- Phylum: Arthropoda
- Class: Insecta
- Order: Lepidoptera
- Superfamily: Noctuoidea
- Family: Erebidae
- Subfamily: Arctiinae
- Genus: Correbia
- Species: C. punctigera

Binomial name
- Correbia punctigera Gaede, 1926

Species of moth

Correbia punctigera is a moth of the subfamily Arctiinae. It was described by Max Gaede in 1926.
