= Çukurlar, İvrindi =

Village in Turkey

Çukurlar
- Neighbourhood
- Location in Turkey Çukurlar (Marmara)
- Coordinates: 39.444°N 27.480°E
- Country: Turkey
- Province: Balıkesir
- District: İvrindi
- Population (2022): 312
- Time zone: UTC+3 (TRT)

Çukurlar is a neighbourhood in the municipality and district of İvrindi, Balıkesir Province in Turkey. Its population is 312 (2022).
