= Doğanca, Gazipaşa =

Doğanca
- Neighbourhood
- Location in Turkey
- Coordinates: 36.2527°N 32.5310°E
- Country: Turkey
- Province: Antalya
- District: Gazipaşa
- Population (2022): 307
- Time zone: UTC+3 (TRT)

Doğanca is a neighbourhood in the municipality and district of Gazipaşa, Antalya Province, Turkey. Its population is 307 (2022).
