= Çile =

- Neighbourhood
- Location in Turkey
- Coordinates: 36.2422°N 32.4871°E
- Country: Turkey
- Province: Antalya
- District: Gazipaşa
- Population (2022): 162
- Time zone: UTC+3 (TRT)

Çile is a neighbourhood in the municipality and district of Gazipaşa, Antalya Province, Turkey. Its population is 162 (2022).
