= Gömeniç =

- Neighbourhood
- Location in Turkey Gömeniç (Marmara)
- Coordinates: 39°38′24″N 27°35′02″E
- Country: Turkey
- Province: Balıkesir
- District: İvrindi
- Population (2022): 156
- Time zone: UTC+3 (TRT)

Gömeniç is a neighbourhood in the municipality and district of İvrindi, Balıkesir Province, Turkey. Its population is 156 (2022).

The village is at an altitude of 287 m (941 ft) above the Sea of Marmara. The village is 27 km from Balıkesir city center and 13 km from İvrindi town.

Gömeniç takes its name from the Gömeniç Castle, but in antiquity was known as Pionia. The village was a seat of a bishop during late antiquity and fell to the Ottoman Turks in 1345.
