= Taşdibi, İvrindi =

Village in Turkey

Taşdibi
- Neighbourhood
- Location in Turkey Taşdibi (Marmara)
- Coordinates: 39.401°N 27.398°E
- Country: Turkey
- Province: Balıkesir
- District: İvrindi
- Population (2022): 127
- Time zone: UTC+3 (TRT)

Taşdibi is a neighbourhood in the municipality and district of İvrindi, Balıkesir Province in Turkey. Its population is 127 (2022).
