= Sofular, İvrindi =

Village in Turkey

Sofular
- Neighbourhood
- Location in Turkey Sofular (Marmara)
- Coordinates: 39.572°N 27.624°E
- Country: Turkey
- Province: Balıkesir
- District: İvrindi
- Population (2022): 381
- Time zone: UTC+3 (TRT)

Sofular is a neighbourhood in the municipality and district of İvrindi, Balıkesir Province in Turkey. Its population is 381 (2022).
