= Çiçekli, İvrindi =

Village in Turkey

Çiçekli
- Neighbourhood
- Location in Turkey Çiçekli (Marmara)
- Coordinates: 39.449°N 27.463°E
- Country: Turkey
- Province: Balıkesir
- District: İvrindi
- Population (2022): 288
- Time zone: UTC+3 (TRT)

Çiçekli is a neighbourhood in the municipality and district of İvrindi, Balıkesir Province in Turkey. Its population is 288 (2022).
