= Ilıcakpınar, İvrindi =

Village in Turkey

Ilıcakpınar
- Neighbourhood
- Location in Turkey Ilıcakpınar (Marmara)
- Coordinates: 39.460°N 27.495°E
- Country: Turkey
- Province: Balıkesir
- District: İvrindi
- Population (2022): 55
- Time zone: UTC+3 (TRT)

Ilıcakpınar is a neighbourhood in the municipality and district of İvrindi, Balıkesir Province in Turkey. Its population is 55 (2022).
