= Yeniköy, Gazipaşa =

Yeniköy
- Neighbourhood
- Country: Turkey
- Province: Antalya
- District: Gazipaşa
- Population (2022): 559
- Time zone: UTC+3 (TRT)

Yeniköy is a neighbourhood in the municipality and district of Gazipaşa, Antalya Province, Turkey. Its population is 559 (2022).
