= Correbia fulvescens =

Scientific classification
- Domain: Eukaryota
- Kingdom: Animalia
- Phylum: Arthropoda
- Class: Insecta
- Order: Lepidoptera
- Superfamily: Noctuoidea
- Family: Erebidae
- Subfamily: Arctiinae
- Genus: Correbia
- Species: C. fulvescens

Binomial name
- Correbia fulvescens Dognin, 1913

Species of moth

Correbia fulvescens is a moth of the subfamily Arctiinae. It was described by Paul Dognin in 1913. It is found in Panama.
