= Yürekli, İvrindi =

Village in Turkey

Yürekli
- Neighbourhood
- Location in Turkey Yürekli (Marmara)
- Coordinates: 39.499°N 27.307°E
- Country: Turkey
- Province: Balıkesir
- District: İvrindi
- Population (2022): 500
- Time zone: UTC+3 (TRT)

Yürekli is a neighbourhood in the municipality and district of İvrindi, Balıkesir Province in Turkey. Its population is 500 (2022).
