= Küçükyenice, İvrindi =

Village in Turkey

Küçükyenice
- Neighbourhood
- Location in Turkey Küçükyenice (Marmara)
- Coordinates: 39.538°N 27.536°E
- Country: Turkey
- Province: Balıkesir
- District: İvrindi
- Population (2022): 621
- Time zone: UTC+3 (TRT)

Küçükyenice is a neighbourhood in the municipality and district of İvrindi, Balıkesir Province in Turkey. Its population is 621 (2022).
