= Çakmak, Gazipaşa =

Çakmak
- Neighbourhood
- Location in Turkey
- Coordinates: 36.3239°N 32.4041°E
- Country: Turkey
- Province: Antalya
- District: Gazipaşa
- Population (2022): 216
- Time zone: UTC+3 (TRT)

Çakmak is a neighbourhood in the municipality and district of Gazipaşa, Antalya Province, Turkey. Its population is 216 (2022).
