= Gökçebelen, Gazipaşa =

Gökçebelen
- Neighbourhood
- Location in Turkey
- Coordinates: 36.1531°N 32.5031°E
- Country: Turkey
- Province: Antalya
- District: Gazipaşa
- Population (2022): 179
- Time zone: UTC+3 (TRT)

Gökçebelen is a neighbourhood in the municipality and district of Gazipaşa, Antalya Province, Turkey. Its population is 179 (2022).
