= Sarıpınar, İvrindi =

Village in Turkey

Sarıpınar
- Neighbourhood
- Location in Turkey Sarıpınar (Marmara)
- Coordinates: 39.472°N 27.536°E
- Country: Turkey
- Province: Balıkesir
- District: İvrindi
- Population (2022): 178
- Time zone: UTC+3 (TRT)

Sarıpınar is a neighbourhood in the municipality and district of İvrindi, Balıkesir Province in Turkey. Its population is 178 (2022).
