= Ayaklı, İvrindi =

Village in Turkey

Ayaklı
- Neighbourhood
- Location in Turkey Ayaklı (Marmara)
- Coordinates: 39.511°N 27.360°E
- Country: Turkey
- Province: Balıkesir
- District: İvrindi
- Population (2022): 332
- Time zone: UTC+3 (TRT)

Ayaklı is a neighbourhood in the municipality and district of İvrindi, Balıkesir Province in Turkey. Its population is 332 (2022).
