= Kırahmetler, Gazipaşa =

Kırahmetler
- Neighbourhood
- Location within Turkey
- Country: Turkey
- Province: Antalya
- District: Gazipaşa
- Population (2022): 289
- Time zone: UTC+3 (TRT)

Kırahmetler is a neighbourhood in the municipality and district of Gazipaşa, Antalya Province, Turkey. Its population is 289 (2024).

The name of the neighborhood derives from a Yörük chieftain named Kır Ahmet, and the Kırahmetler are the most recent Yörük tribe to settle in Gazipaşa. They established the village of Kırahmetler by purchasing the lands they used as winter pastures

The Kırahmetler tribe identifies itself as "Abdil Uşağı" and is divided into three groups: "Hasan Uşağı" and "Kara Yusuf Uşağı." These three groups form distinct branches of the Bahşiş tribe. The Kırahmetler tribe belongs to the Qara Qoyunlu Tribe (قاراقویونلولار) but maintains a separate identity from the Teke Turkmens within the Bahşiş tribe. Abdil Bey is regarded as the progenitor of the Kırahmetler tribe, and some studies suggest a connection between him and the Karamanoglu feudal lords. Abdil Bey migrated from the Horasan region to the vicinity of Erzurum . After residing there for some time, the tribe later settled in the Çukurova-Taşeli Region. Over time, they migrated from this area to Anamur and eventually to the Gazipaşa region. Abdil Bey had three sons: Abdil, Hasan, and Yusuf, and his garndson, Kırahmet Bey, is recognized today as the eponymous ancestor of the tribe and the neighborhood. Furthermore, the Kırahmetler Clans and their members are currently residing in various locations, including Muzkent and Tosalak in Gazipaşa, Sugözü in Alanya, and Kaş in Antalya.

== Family Tree ==
Abdil Begh of Qaraqoyunlu

|

├── Sarı Hasan (Ancestor of Hasan Uşağı)

|

├── Kara Yusuf

|

└── Abdil (Ancestor of Abdil Uşağı)

|

├── Kır Ahmet

| |

| ├── Yağır Mehmet

| ├── Yağır Mustafa

| | ├── Kır Ahmet

| | ├── Boz Halil

| | └── Hıdır Begh

| └── Çalık İbrahim

|

├── Kır Süleyman

|

├── Şıh Mehmet

|

└── Kır Dede
