= Soğanbükü, İvrindi =

Village in Turkey

Soğanbükü
- Neighbourhood
- Location in Turkey Soğanbükü (Marmara)
- Coordinates: 39°37′44″N 27°34′37″E
- Country: Turkey
- Province: Balıkesir
- District: İvrindi
- Population (2022): 807
- Time zone: UTC+3 (TRT)

Soğanbükü is a neighbourhood in the municipality and district of İvrindi, Balıkesir Province in Turkey. Its population is 807 (2022).
