= Karaçebiş, İvrindi =

Village in Turkey

Karaçebiş
- Neighbourhood
- Location in Turkey Karaçebiş (Marmara)
- Coordinates: 39°33′17″N 27°25′59″E
- Country: Turkey
- Province: Balıkesir
- District: İvrindi
- Population (2022): 654
- Time zone: UTC+3 (TRT)

Karaçebiş is a neighbourhood in the municipality and district of İvrindi, Balıkesir Province in Turkey. Its population is 654 (2022).
