= Kılcılar, İvrindi =

Village in Turkey

Kılcılar
- Neighbourhood
- Location in Turkey Kılcılar (Marmara)
- Coordinates: 39°26′01″N 27°19′52″E
- Country: Turkey
- Province: Balıkesir
- District: İvrindi
- Population (2022): 104
- Time zone: UTC+3 (TRT)

Kılcılar is a neighbourhood in the municipality and district of İvrindi, Balıkesir Province in Turkey. Its population is 104 (2022).
