= Beyrebucak, Gazipaşa =

Beyrebucak
- Neighbourhood
- Location in Turkey
- Coordinates: 36°13′N 32°23′E
- Country: Turkey
- Province: Antalya
- District: Gazipaşa
- Population (2022): 1,610
- Time zone: UTC+3 (TRT)

Beyrebucak is a neighbourhood in the municipality and district of Gazipaşa, Antalya Province, Turkey. Its population is 1,610 (2022).
