= Üçkonak, Gazipaşa =

Üçkonak
- Neighbourhood
- Location in Turkey
- Coordinates: 36.2788°N 32.4853°E
- Country: Turkey
- Province: Antalya
- District: Gazipaşa
- Population (2022): 119
- Time zone: UTC+3 (TRT)

Üçkonak is a neighbourhood in the municipality and district of Gazipaşa, Antalya Province, Turkey. Its population is 119 (2022).
