= Gökçesaray, Gazipaşa =

Gökçesaray
- Neighbourhood
- Location in Turkey
- Coordinates: 36.2588°N 32.5538°E
- Country: Turkey
- Province: Antalya
- District: Gazipaşa
- Population (2022): 135
- Time zone: UTC+3 (TRT)

Gökçesaray is a neighbourhood in the municipality and district of Gazipaşa, Antalya Province, Turkey. Its population is 135 (2022).
