= Ilıcaköy, Gazipaşa =

Ilıcaköy
- Neighbourhood
- Country: Turkey
- Province: Antalya
- District: Gazipaşa
- Population (2022): 477
- Time zone: UTC+3 (TRT)

Ilıcaköy is a neighbourhood in the municipality and district of Gazipaşa, Antalya Province, Turkey. Its population is 477 (2022).
