= Zeytinada, Gazipaşa =

Zeytinada
- Neighbourhood
- Location in Turkey
- Coordinates: 36°08′N 32°28′E
- Country: Turkey
- Province: Antalya
- District: Gazipaşa
- Population (2022): 622
- Time zone: UTC+3 (TRT)

Zeytinada is a neighbourhood in the municipality and district of Gazipaşa, Antalya Province, Turkey. Its population is 622 (2022).
