= Kınaköy, İvrindi =

Village in Turkey

Kınaköy
- Neighbourhood
- Location in Turkey Kınaköy (Marmara)
- Coordinates: 39°29′22″N 27°16′34″E
- Country: Turkey
- Province: Balıkesir
- District: İvrindi
- Population (2022): 127
- Time zone: UTC+3 (TRT)

Kınaköy is a neighbourhood in the municipality and district of İvrindi, Balıkesir Province in Turkey. Its population is 127 (2022).
