= Karatepe, Gazipaşa =

Karatepe
- Neighbourhood
- Location in Turkey
- Coordinates: 36.4029°N 32.4101°E
- Country: Turkey
- Province: Antalya
- District: Gazipaşa
- Population (2022): 417
- Time zone: UTC+3 (TRT)

Karatepe is a neighbourhood in the municipality and district of Gazipaşa, Antalya Province, Turkey. Its population is 417 (2022).
