= Gürçam, Gazipaşa =

Gürçam
- Neighbourhood
- Location in Turkey
- Coordinates: 36.2115°N 32.4939°E
- Country: Turkey
- Province: Antalya
- District: Gazipaşa
- Population (2022): 142
- Time zone: UTC+3 (TRT)

Gürçam is a neighbourhood in the municipality and district of Gazipaşa, Antalya Province, Turkey. Its population is 142 (2022).
