= Yeşilyurt, Gazipaşa =

Yeşilyurt
- Neighbourhood
- Location in Turkey
- Coordinates: 36.3392°N 32.4885°E
- Country: Turkey
- Province: Antalya
- District: Gazipaşa
- Population (2022): 266
- Time zone: UTC+3 (TRT)

Yeşilyurt is a neighbourhood in the municipality and district of Gazipaşa, Antalya Province, Turkey. Its population is 266 (2022).
