= Çığlık, Gazipaşa =

Çığlık
- Neighbourhood
- Location in Turkey
- Coordinates: 36.3134°N 32.5231°E
- Country: Turkey
- Province: Antalya
- District: Gazipaşa
- Population (2022): 323
- Time zone: UTC+3 (TRT)

Çığlık is a neighbourhood in the municipality and district of Gazipaşa, Antalya Province, Turkey. Its population is 323 (2022).
