= Gümeli, İvrindi =

Village in Turkey

Gümeli
- Neighbourhood
- Location in Turkey Gümeli (Marmara)
- Coordinates: 39.418°N 27.298°E
- Country: Turkey
- Province: Balıkesir
- District: İvrindi
- Population (2022): 640
- Time zone: UTC+3 (TRT)

Gümeli is a neighbourhood in the municipality and district of İvrindi, Balıkesir Province in Turkey. Its population is 640 (2022).
