= Correbia meridionalis =

Scientific classification
- Domain: Eukaryota
- Kingdom: Animalia
- Phylum: Arthropoda
- Class: Insecta
- Order: Lepidoptera
- Superfamily: Noctuoidea
- Family: Erebidae
- Subfamily: Arctiinae
- Genus: Correbia
- Species: C. meridionalis

Binomial name
- Correbia meridionalis (Rothschild, 1912)

Synonyms
- Correbidia meridionalis Rothschild, 1912

Species of moth

Correbia meridionalis is a moth of the subfamily Arctiinae. It was described by Walter Rothschild, 2nd Baron Rothschild, in 1912. It is found in Ecuador.

The wingspan is about 36 mm. The forewings are orange-scarlet with a minute blackish spot at the middle of the costa and a blackish streak on the inner margin. There is also a rounded apical black-brown patch, slightly tinged with bluish. The costa and veins are streaked with orange and the terminal area below it has slight brown streaks in the interspaces. The hindwings are brown, the lower part of the cell and the area just below it are semihyaline.
