= Sarıca, İvrindi =

Village in Turkey

Sarıca
- Neighbourhood
- Location in Turkey Sarıca (Marmara)
- Coordinates: 39.625°N 27.491°E
- Country: Turkey
- Province: Balıkesir
- District: İvrindi
- Population (2022): 131
- Time zone: UTC+3 (TRT)

Sarıca is a neighbourhood in the municipality and district of İvrindi, Balıkesir Province in Turkey. Its population is 131 (2022).
