= Gözlüçayır, İvrindi =

Village in Turkey

Gözlüçayır
- Neighbourhood
- Location in Turkey Gözlüçayır (Marmara)
- Coordinates: 39.519°N 27.554°E
- Country: Turkey
- Province: Balıkesir
- District: İvrindi
- Population (2022): 195
- Time zone: UTC+3 (TRT)

Gözlüçayır is a neighbourhood in the municipality and district of İvrindi, Balıkesir Province in Turkey. Its population is 195 (2022).
