= Sugözü, Gazipaşa =

Sugözü
- Neighbourhood
- Location in Turkey
- Coordinates: 36.4252°N 32.4480°E
- Country: Turkey
- Province: Antalya
- District: Gazipaşa
- Population (2022): 210
- Time zone: UTC+3 (TRT)

Sugözü is a neighbourhood in the municipality and district of Gazipaşa, Antalya Province, Turkey. Its population is 210 (2022).

== History ==
According to a 1928 record, the neighborhood's name was mentioned to be Kurukarı.

== Geography ==
The neighborhood is 202 kilometers away from the city center of Antalya, and it is 27.3 kilometers away from the district center of Gazipaşa.
