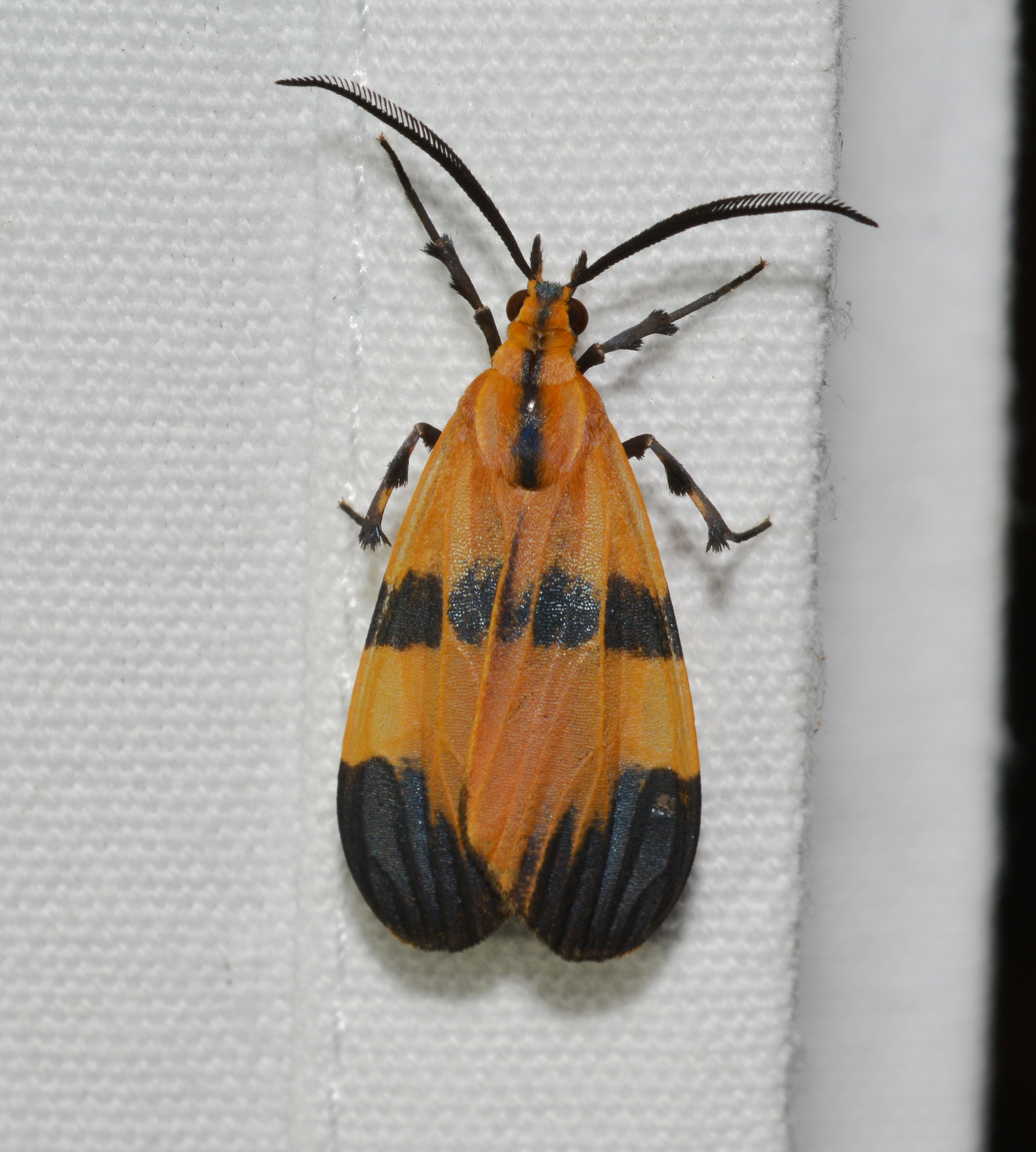

Scientific classification
- Domain: Eukaryota
- Kingdom: Animalia
- Phylum: Arthropoda
- Class: Insecta
- Order: Lepidoptera
- Superfamily: Noctuoidea
- Family: Erebidae
- Subfamily: Arctiinae
- Genus: Correbia
- Species: C. undulata

Binomial name
- Correbia undulata (H. Druce, 1884)

Synonyms
- Pionia undulata H. Druce, 1884; Correbia undulata f. flavidorsalis Draudt, 1915; Correbia undulata f. nigridorsalis Draudt, 1915

= Correbia undulata =

Species of moth

Correbia undulata is a moth of the subfamily Arctiinae. It was described by Herbert Druce in 1884. It is found in Mexico and Guatemala.
