= Akoluk, Gazipaşa =

Akoluk
- Neighbourhood
- Location in Turkey
- Coordinates: 36.2874°N 32.5782°E
- Country: Turkey
- Province: Antalya
- District: Gazipaşa
- Population (2022): 81
- Time zone: UTC+3 (TRT)

Akoluk is a neighbourhood in the municipality and district of Gazipaşa, Antalya Province, Turkey. Its population is 81 (2022).
