= Eriklikömürcü, İvrindi =

Village in Turkey

Eriklikömürcü
- Neighbourhood
- Location in Turkey Eriklikömürcü (Marmara)
- Coordinates: 39.580°N 27.574°E
- Country: Turkey
- Province: Balıkesir
- District: İvrindi
- Population (2022): 77
- Time zone: UTC+3 (TRT)

Eriklikömürcü is a neighbourhood in the municipality and district of İvrindi, Balıkesir Province in Turkey. Its population is 77 (2022).
