= Susuzyayla, İvrindi =

Village in Turkey

Susuzyayla
- Neighbourhood
- Location in Turkey Susuzyayla (Marmara)
- Coordinates: 39°30′30″N 27°30′58″E
- Country: Turkey
- Province: Balıkesir
- District: İvrindi
- Population (2022): 258
- Time zone: UTC+3 (TRT)

Susuzyayla is a neighbourhood in the municipality and district of İvrindi, Balıkesir Province in Turkey. Its population is 258 (2022).
