= Demirciler, İvrindi =

Village in Turkey

Demirciler
- Neighbourhood
- Location in Turkey Demirciler (Marmara)
- Coordinates: 39.473°N 27.244°E
- Country: Turkey
- Province: Balıkesir
- District: İvrindi
- Population (2022): 185
- Time zone: UTC+3 (TRT)

Demirciler is a neighbourhood in the municipality and district of İvrindi, Balıkesir Province in Turkey. Its population is 185 (2022).
