= Correbia flavata =

Scientific classification
- Domain: Eukaryota
- Kingdom: Animalia
- Phylum: Arthropoda
- Class: Insecta
- Order: Lepidoptera
- Superfamily: Noctuoidea
- Family: Erebidae
- Subfamily: Arctiinae
- Genus: Correbia
- Species: C. flavata

Binomial name
- Correbia flavata H. Druce, 1909

Species of moth

Correbia flavata is a moth of the subfamily Arctiinae. It was described by Herbert Druce in 1909. It is found in Colombia.
