= Esenpınar, Gazipaşa =

Esenpınar
- Neighbourhood
- Location in Turkey
- Coordinates: 36.2809°N 32.5292°E
- Country: Turkey
- Province: Antalya
- District: Gazipaşa
- Population (2022): 61
- Time zone: UTC+3 (TRT)

Esenpınar is a neighbourhood in the municipality and district of Gazipaşa, Antalya Province, Turkey. Its population is 61 (2022).
