= Kıpıklar, İvrindi =

Village in Turkey

Kıpıklar
- Neighbourhood
- Location in Turkey Kıpıklar (Marmara)
- Coordinates: 39°28′37″N 27°14′47″E
- Country: Turkey
- Province: Balıkesir
- District: İvrindi
- Population (2022): 235
- Time zone: UTC+3 (TRT)

Kıpıklar is a neighbourhood in the municipality and district of İvrindi, Balıkesir Province in Turkey. Its population is 235 (2022).
