= Şahinler, Gazipaşa =

Şahinler
- Neighbourhood
- Location in Turkey
- Coordinates: 36.4212°N 32.4319°E
- Country: Turkey
- Province: Antalya
- District: Gazipaşa
- Population (2022): 117
- Time zone: UTC+3 (TRT)

Şahinler is a neighbourhood in the municipality and district of Gazipaşa, Antalya Province, Turkey. Its population is 117 (2022).
