= Çörüş, Gazipaşa =

Çörüş
- Neighbourhood
- Location in Turkey
- Coordinates: 36.3091°N 32.4772°E
- Country: Turkey
- Province: Antalya
- District: Gazipaşa
- Population (2022): 247
- Time zone: UTC+3 (TRT)

Çörüş is a neighbourhood in the municipality and district of Gazipaşa, Antalya Province, Turkey. Its population is 247 (2022).
