= Correbia oberthuri =

Scientific classification
- Kingdom: Animalia
- Phylum: Arthropoda
- Class: Insecta
- Order: Lepidoptera
- Superfamily: Noctuoidea
- Family: Erebidae
- Subfamily: Arctiinae
- Genus: Correbia
- Species: C. oberthuri

Binomial name
- Correbia oberthuri Hampson, 1898

Synonyms
- Mimica lycoides Oberthür, 1881

Species of moth

Correbia oberthuri is a moth of the subfamily Arctiinae. It was described by George Hampson in 1898. It is found in Peru and Bolivia.
