= Paeonia =

Paeonia or Paionia may refer to:

- Paeonia, the genus which comprises all peony plants
- Paeonia (kingdom), an ancient state occupying roughly the same area as the present-day Republic of North Macedonia
- Paionia (municipality), in the Central Macedonia region of Greece
- Paeonia, alternate name of Paeonidae, a deme of ancient Attica
- 1061 Paeonia, an asteroid

== See also ==
- Pionia (disambiguation)
