= Korubaşı, Gazipaşa =

Korubaşı
- Neighbourhood
- Location in Turkey
- Coordinates: 36.2706°N 32.3506°E
- Country: Turkey
- Province: Antalya
- District: Gazipaşa
- Population (2022): 1,452
- Time zone: UTC+3 (TRT)

Korubaşı is a neighbourhood in the municipality and district of Gazipaşa, Antalya Province, Turkey. Its population is 1,452 (2022).
