= Correbia felderi =

Scientific classification
- Domain: Eukaryota
- Kingdom: Animalia
- Phylum: Arthropoda
- Class: Insecta
- Order: Lepidoptera
- Superfamily: Noctuoidea
- Family: Erebidae
- Subfamily: Arctiinae
- Genus: Correbia
- Species: C. felderi

Binomial name
- Correbia felderi Rothschild, 1912

Species of moth

Correbia felderi is a moth of the subfamily Arctiinae. It was described by Rothschild in 1912. It is found in French Guiana.
