= Küçükılıca, İvrindi =

Village in Turkey

Küçükılıca
- Neighbourhood
- Location in Turkey Küçükılıca (Marmara)
- Coordinates: 39°26′25″N 27°15′39″E
- Country: Turkey
- Province: Balıkesir
- District: İvrindi
- Population (2022): 180
- Time zone: UTC+3 (TRT)

Küçükılıca is a neighbourhood in the municipality and district of İvrindi, Balıkesir Province in Turkey. Its population is 180 (2022).
