= Yenigüney, Gazipaşa =

Yenigüney
- Neighbourhood
- Location in Turkey
- Coordinates: 36.2867°N 32.4530°E
- Country: Turkey
- Province: Antalya
- District: Gazipaşa
- Population (2022): 183
- Time zone: UTC+3 (TRT)

Yenigüney is a neighbourhood in the municipality and district of Gazipaşa, Antalya Province, Turkey. Its population is 183 (2022).
