= Hüseyinbeyobası, İvrindi =

Village in Turkey

Hüseyinbeyobası
- Neighbourhood
- Location in Turkey Hüseyinbeyobası (Marmara)
- Coordinates: 39.619°N 27.378°E
- Country: Turkey
- Province: Balıkesir
- District: İvrindi
- Population (2022): 201
- Time zone: UTC+3 (TRT)

Hüseyinbeyobası is a neighbourhood in the municipality and district of İvrindi, Balıkesir Province in Turkey. Its population is 201 (2022).
