= Evciler, İvrindi =

Village in Turkey

Evciler
- Neighbourhood
- Location in Turkey Evciler (Marmara)
- Coordinates: 39.664°N 27.471°E
- Country: Turkey
- Province: Balıkesir
- District: İvrindi
- Population (2022): 558
- Time zone: UTC+3 (TRT)

Evciler is a neighbourhood in the municipality and district of İvrindi, Balıkesir Province in Turkey. Its population is 558 (2022).
