= Kiraz Ören, İvrindi =

Village in Turkey

Kiraz Ören
- Neighbourhood
- Location in Turkey Kiraz Ören (Marmara)
- Coordinates: 39°35′35″N 27°36′32″E
- Country: Turkey
- Province: Balıkesir
- District: İvrindi
- Population (2022): 482
- Time zone: UTC+3 (TRT)

Kiraz Ören is a neighbourhood in the municipality and district of İvrindi, Balıkesir Province in Turkey. Its population is 482 (2022).
