= Kaşağıl, İvrindi =

Village in Turkey

Kaşağıl
- Neighbourhood
- Location in Turkey Kaşağıl (Marmara)
- Coordinates: 39°28′04″N 27°25′05″E
- Country: Turkey
- Province: Balıkesir
- District: İvrindi
- Population (2022): 262
- Time zone: UTC+3 (TRT)

Kaşağıl is a neighbourhood in the municipality and district of İvrindi, Balıkesir Province in Turkey. Its population is 262 (2022).
