= Aydıncık, Gazipaşa =

Aydıncık
- Neighbourhood
- Location in Turkey
- Coordinates: 36.3035°N 32.3066°E
- Country: Turkey
- Province: Antalya
- District: Gazipaşa
- Population (2022): 875
- Time zone: UTC+3 (TRT)

Aydıncık is a neighbourhood in the municipality and district of Gazipaşa, Antalya Province, Turkey. Its population is 875 (2022).
