= Karalar, Gazipaşa =

Karalar
- Neighbourhood
- Location in Turkey
- Coordinates: 36.3404°N 32.3135°E
- Country: Turkey
- Province: Antalya
- District: Gazipaşa
- Population (2022): 1,508
- Time zone: UTC+3 (TRT)

Karalar is a neighbourhood in the municipality and district of Gazipaşa, Antalya Province, Turkey. Its population is 1,508 (2022).
