= Correbia affinis =

Scientific classification
- Domain: Eukaryota
- Kingdom: Animalia
- Phylum: Arthropoda
- Class: Insecta
- Order: Lepidoptera
- Superfamily: Noctuoidea
- Family: Erebidae
- Subfamily: Arctiinae
- Genus: Correbia
- Species: C. affinis

Binomial name
- Correbia affinis (H. Druce, 1884)

Synonyms
- Pionia affinis H. Druce, 1884

Species of moth

Correbia affinis is a moth of the subfamily Arctiinae. It was described by Herbert Druce in 1884. It is found in Guatemala.
