= Döşeme, İvrindi =

Village in Turkey

Döşeme
- Neighbourhood
- Location in Turkey Döşeme (Marmara)
- Coordinates: 39.417°N 27.428°E
- Country: Turkey
- Province: Balıkesir
- District: İvrindi
- Population (2022): 134
- Time zone: UTC+3 (TRT)

Döşeme is a neighbourhood in the municipality and district of İvrindi, Balıkesir Province in Turkey. Its population is 134 (2022).
