= Geçmiş, İvrindi =

Village in Turkey

Geçmiş
- Neighbourhood
- Location in Turkey Geçmiş (Marmara)
- Coordinates: 39.549°N 27.369°E
- Country: Turkey
- Province: Balıkesir
- District: İvrindi
- Population (2022): 413
- Time zone: UTC+3 (TRT)

Geçmiş is a neighbourhood in the municipality and district of İvrindi, Balıkesir Province in Turkey. Its population is 413 (2022).
