= Correbia raca =

Scientific classification
- Domain: Eukaryota
- Kingdom: Animalia
- Phylum: Arthropoda
- Class: Insecta
- Order: Lepidoptera
- Superfamily: Noctuoidea
- Family: Erebidae
- Subfamily: Arctiinae
- Genus: Correbia
- Species: C. raca

Binomial name
- Correbia raca (H. Druce, 1896)

Synonyms
- Pionia raca H. Druce, 1896

Species of moth

Correbia raca is a moth of the subfamily Arctiinae. It was described by Herbert Druce in 1896. It is found in Panama.
