= Gökçeler, İvrindi =

Village in Turkey

Gökçeler
- Neighbourhood
- Location in Turkey Gökçeler (Marmara)
- Coordinates: 39.649°N 27.422°E
- Country: Turkey
- Province: Balıkesir
- District: İvrindi
- Population (2022): 287
- Time zone: UTC+3 (TRT)

Gökçeler is a neighbourhood in the municipality and district of İvrindi, Balıkesir Province in Turkey. Its population is 287 (2022).
