= Gebeçınar, İvrindi =

Village in Turkey

Gebeçınar
- Neighbourhood
- Location in Turkey Gebeçınar (Marmara)
- Coordinates: 39°26′27″N 27°17′07″E
- Country: Turkey
- Province: Balıkesir
- District: İvrindi
- Population (2022): 337
- Time zone: UTC+3 (TRT)

Gebeçınar is a neighbourhood in the municipality and district of İvrindi, Balıkesir Province in Turkey. Its population is 337 (2022).
