= Kuşdere, İvrindi =

Village in Turkey

Kuşdere
- Neighbourhood
- Location in Turkey Kuşdere (Marmara)
- Coordinates: 39°26′53″N 27°18′26″E
- Country: Turkey
- Province: Balıkesir
- District: İvrindi
- Population (2022): 204
- Time zone: UTC+3 (TRT)

Kuşdere is a neighbourhood in the municipality and district of İvrindi, Balıkesir Province in Turkey. Its population is 204 (2022).
