= Büyükfındık, İvrindi =

Village in Turkey

Büyükfındık
- Neighbourhood
- Location in Turkey Büyükfındık (Marmara)
- Coordinates: 39°33′29″N 27°34′40″E
- Country: Turkey
- Province: Balıkesir
- District: İvrindi
- Population (2022): 603
- Time zone: UTC+3 (TRT)

Büyükfındık is a neighbourhood in the municipality and district of İvrindi, Balıkesir Province in Turkey. Its population is 603 (2022).
