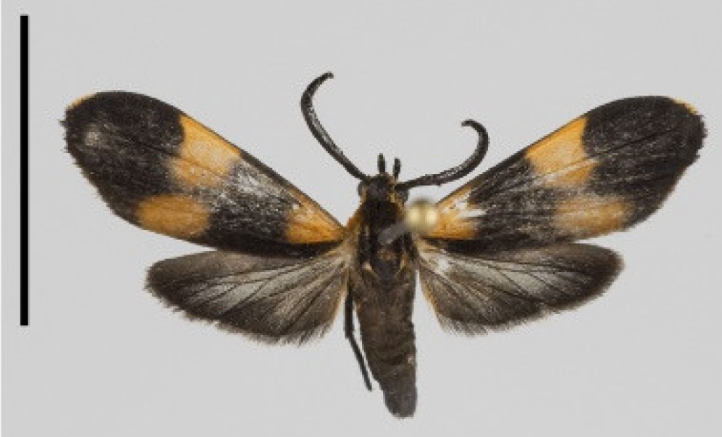

Scientific classification
- Domain: Eukaryota
- Kingdom: Animalia
- Phylum: Arthropoda
- Class: Insecta
- Order: Lepidoptera
- Superfamily: Noctuoidea
- Family: Erebidae
- Subfamily: Arctiinae
- Genus: Correbia
- Species: C. minima

Binomial name
- Correbia minima H. Druce, 1905

= Correbia minima =

Species of moth

Correbia minima is a moth of the subfamily Arctiinae. It was described by Herbert Druce in 1905. It is found in Venezuela.
