= Hasdere, Gazipaşa =

Hasdere
- Neighbourhood
- Location in Turkey
- Coordinates: 36°16′N 32°22′E
- Country: Turkey
- Province: Antalya
- District: Gazipaşa
- Population (2022): 614
- Time zone: UTC+3 (TRT)

Hasdere is a neighbourhood in the municipality and district of Gazipaşa, Antalya Province, Turkey. Its population is 614 (2022).
