= Kahyalar, Gazipaşa =

Kahyalar
- Neighbourhood
- Location in Turkey
- Coordinates: 36.3102°N 32.2802°E
- Country: Turkey
- Province: Antalya
- District: Gazipaşa
- Population (2022): 1,500
- Time zone: UTC+3 (TRT)

Kahyalar is a neighbourhood in the municipality and district of Gazipaşa, Antalya Province, Turkey. Its population is 1,500 (2022). Before the 2013 reorganisation, it was a town (belde).
