= Çamlıca, Gazipaşa =

Çamlıca
- Neighbourhood
- Location in Turkey
- Coordinates: 36.3957°N 32.4233°E
- Country: Turkey
- Province: Antalya
- District: Gazipaşa
- Population (2022): 137
- Time zone: UTC+3 (TRT)

Çamlıca is a neighbourhood in the municipality and district of Gazipaşa, Antalya Province, Turkey. Its population is 137 (2022).
