= Çatalan, İvrindi =

Village in Turkey

Çatalan
- Neighbourhood
- Location in Turkey Çatalan (Marmara)
- Coordinates: 39.451°N 27.448°E
- Country: Turkey
- Province: Balıkesir
- District: İvrindi
- Population (2022): 266
- Time zone: UTC+3 (TRT)

Çatalan is a neighbourhood in the municipality and district of İvrindi, Balıkesir Province in Turkey. Its population is 266 (2022).
