= Çarkacı, İvrindi =

Village in Turkey

Çarkacı
- Neighbourhood
- Location in Turkey Çarkacı (Marmara)
- Coordinates: 39°29′00″N 27°24′16″E
- Country: Turkey
- Province: Balıkesir
- District: İvrindi
- Population (2022): 230
- Time zone: UTC+3 (TRT)

Çarkacı is a neighbourhood in the municipality and district of İvrindi, Balıkesir Province in Turkey. Its population is 230 (2022).
