= Çalıpınar, Gazipaşa =

Çalıpınar
- Neighbourhood
- Location in Turkey
- Coordinates: 36.3203°N 32.3119°E
- Country: Turkey
- Province: Antalya
- District: Gazipaşa
- Population (2022): 476
- Time zone: UTC+3 (TRT)

Çalıpınar is a neighbourhood in the municipality and district of Gazipaşa, Antalya Province, Turkey. Its population is 476 (2022).
