= Kocaoba, İvrindi =

Village in Turkey

Kocaoba
- Neighbourhood
- Location in Turkey Kocaoba (Marmara)
- Coordinates: 39.637°N 27.396°E
- Country: Turkey
- Province: Balıkesir
- District: İvrindi
- Population (2022): 231
- Time zone: UTC+3 (TRT)

Kocaoba is a neighbourhood in the municipality and district of İvrindi, Balıkesir Province in Turkey. Its population is 231 (2022).
