= Değirmenbaşı, İvrindi =

Village in Turkey

Değirmenbaşı
- Neighbourhood
- Location in Turkey Değirmenbaşı (Marmara)
- Coordinates: 39.466°N 27.236°E
- Country: Turkey
- Province: Balıkesir
- District: İvrindi
- Population (2022): 690
- Time zone: UTC+3 (TRT)

Değirmenbaşı is a neighbourhood in the municipality and district of İvrindi, Balıkesir Province in Turkey. Its population is 690 (2022).
