= Pionia (Mysia) =

Ancient city of Mysia

Coordinates: 39°37′34″N 27°34′46″E

Pionia (Ancient Greek: Πιονία) or Pioniai (Πιονίαι) was a town in the interior of ancient Mysia, on the river Satnioeis, to the northwest of Antandrus, and to the northeast of Gargara.

Its people believed the town was founded by Pionis, one of the descendants of Heracles. According to local tradition, whenever the inhabitants prepared a sacrifice to honor him as a hero, smoke would mysteriously rise from his tomb on its own.

Under the Roman dominion it belonged to the jurisdiction of Adramyttium, and in the ecclesiastical notices it appears as a bishopric of the Hellespontine province. The bishop Aetius represented the city at the Council of Ephesus. No longer the seat of a residential bishop, it remains a titular see of the Roman Catholic Church.

Its site is located near Gömeniç in Asiatic Turkey.
