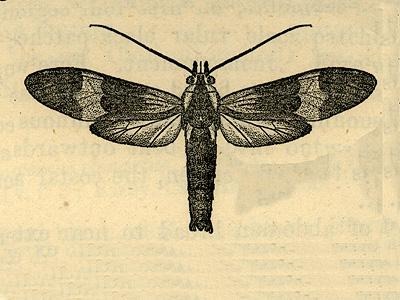
- Correbia lycoides, illustration, 1898

Scientific classification
- Domain: Eukaryota
- Kingdom: Animalia
- Phylum: Arthropoda
- Class: Insecta
- Order: Lepidoptera
- Superfamily: Noctuoidea
- Family: Erebidae
- Subfamily: Arctiinae
- Tribe: Ctenuchini
- Genus: Correbia; Herrich-Schäffer, [1855]

Synonyms
- Pionia Walker, 1854; Mimica Oberthür, 1881

= Correbia =

Genus of moths

Correbia is a genus of moths in the subfamily Arctiinae. The genus was erected by Gottlieb August Wilhelm Herrich-Schäffer in 1855.

== Species ==
- Correbia affinis (Druce, 1884)
- Correbia agnonides (Druce, 1884)
- Correbia bricenoi Rothschild, 1912
- Correbia elongatus (Dognin, 1890)
- Correbia euryptera Dognin, 1916
- Correbia felderi Rothschild, 1912
- Correbia flavata Druce, 1909
- Correbia fulvescens Dognin, 1913
- Correbia lycoides (Walker, 1854)
- Correbia meridionalis Rothschild, 1912
- Correbia minima Druce, 1905
- Correbia negrona Draudt, 1917
- Correbia oberthuri Hampson, 1898
- Correbia obscura Schaus, 1905
- Correbia obtusa (Druce, 1884)
- Correbia punctigera Gaede, 1926
- Correbia raca (Druce, 1896)
- Correbia rufescens Rothschild, 1912
- Correbia semitransversa Schaus, 1911
- Correbia tristitia Kaye, 1911
- Correbia undulata (Druce, 1884)
