= Çobanlar, Gazipaşa =

Çobanlar
- Neighbourhood
- Location in Turkey
- Coordinates: 36.2444°N 32.3608°E
- Country: Turkey
- Province: Antalya
- District: Gazipaşa
- Population (2022): 1,225
- Time zone: UTC+3 (TRT)
- Postal code: 07900
- Area code: 0242

Çobanlar is a neighbourhood in the municipality and district of Gazipaşa, Antalya Province, Turkey. Its population is 1,225 (2022).

== History ==
The village's name is mentioned as being Çobanlı in the Ottoman Archives.
