= Selinus (Cilicia) =

Archaeological site in Turkey

Coordinates: 36°15′30″N 32°16′59″E

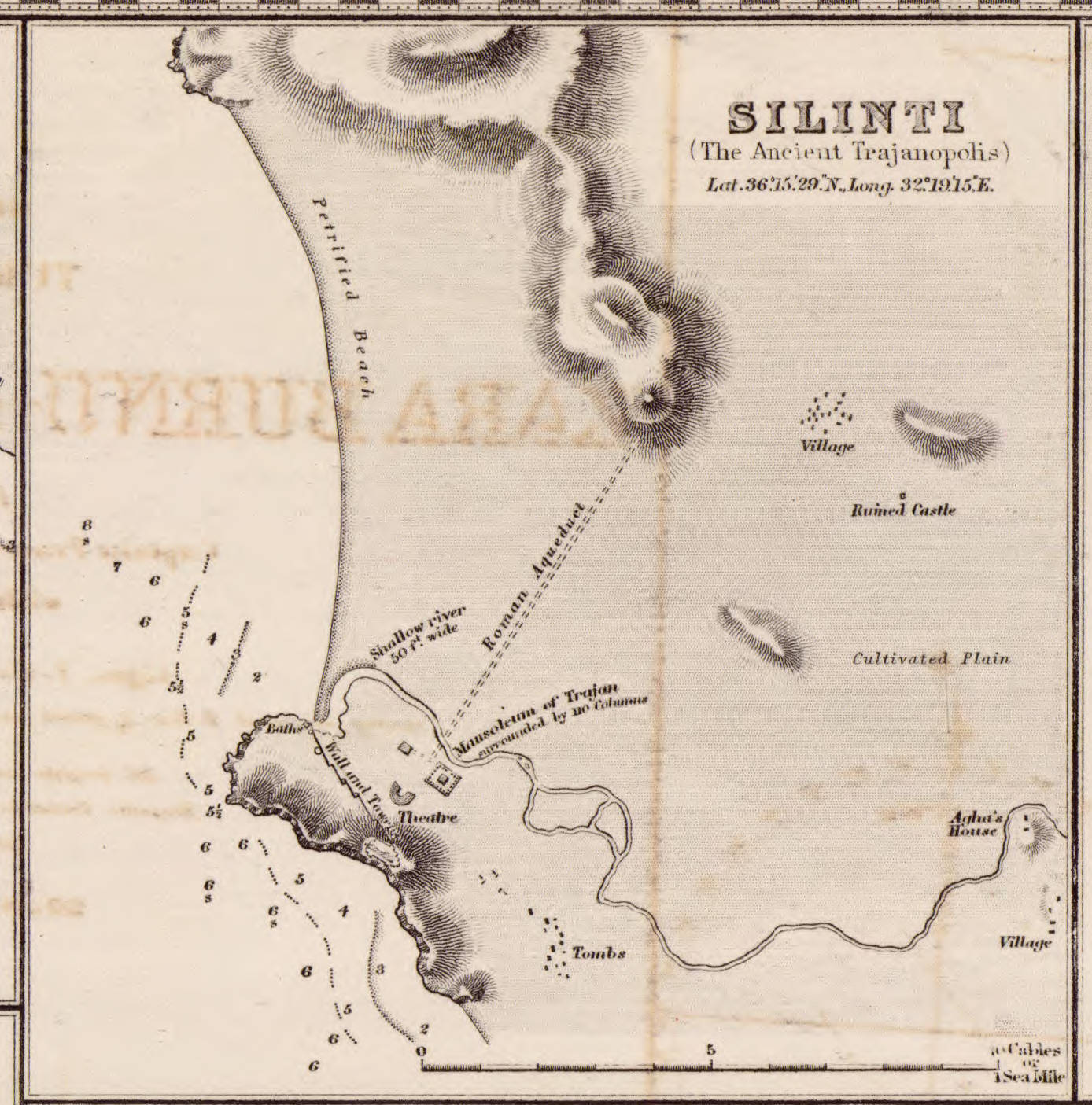
Map of the ancient Trajanopolis from an Admiralty Chart of 1812

Selinus or Selinous (Ancient Greek: Σελινούς, romanized: Selinoús; Latin: Selinus; Neo-Babylonian Akkadian: 𒌷𒊓𒀠𒇻𒉌𒂊, romanized: Sallunê) was a port-town on the west coast of Rough Cilicia and later of Isauria, at the mouth of a small river of the same name, now called Musa Çay. It is located west of the modern city of Gazipaşa in Turkey.

== History ==
In 557 BC, the Neo-Babylonian king Neriglissar captured Sallunê, that is Selinus, during his campaign against the kingdom of Pirindu. Before returning to Babylon, Neriglissar started fires from the pass of Sallunê to the border of Lydia.

=== Roman period ===
Selinus is memorable in history as the place in which Emperor Trajan is said by some authors to have died in 117 AD. After that event, the place for a time bore the name of Trajanopolis or Traianopolis (Τραϊανούπολις), but its bishops afterwards are called bishops of Selinus. Basil of Seleucia describes the place as reduced to a state of insignificance in his time though it had once been a great commercial town.

== The site ==
Selinus was situated on a precipitous rock, surrounded on almost every side by the sea, by which position it was rendered almost impregnable. The whole of the rock, however, was not included in the ancient line of fortifications. Inside the walls there still are many traces of houses, but on the outside and between the foot of the hill and the river, the remains of some large buildings are yet standing, which appear to be a mausoleum, an agora, a theatre, an aqueduct and some tombs. No longer a residential bishopric, it remains a titular see of the Roman Catholic Church.

== Gallery ==
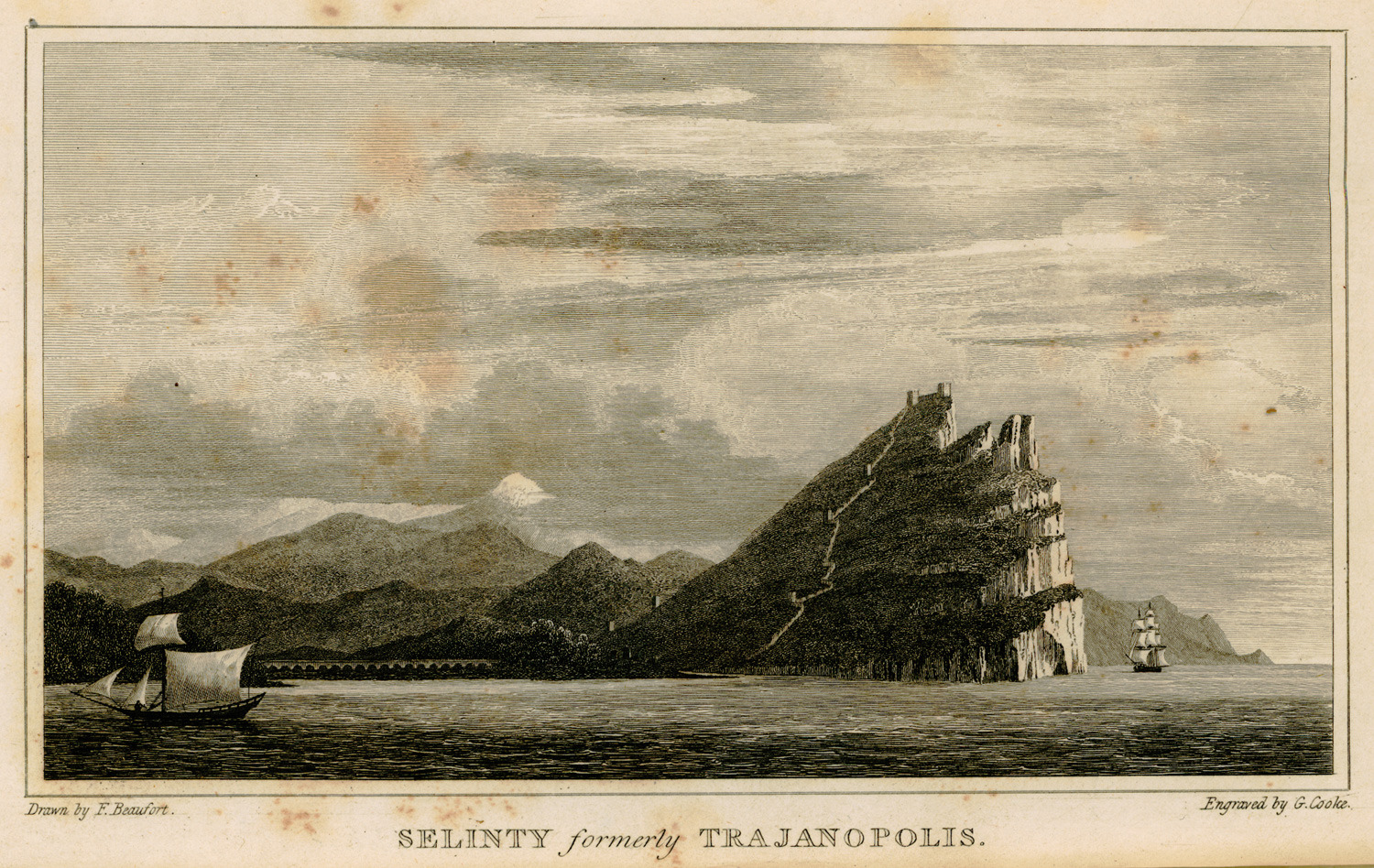
Trajanopolis from Beaufort (1817)

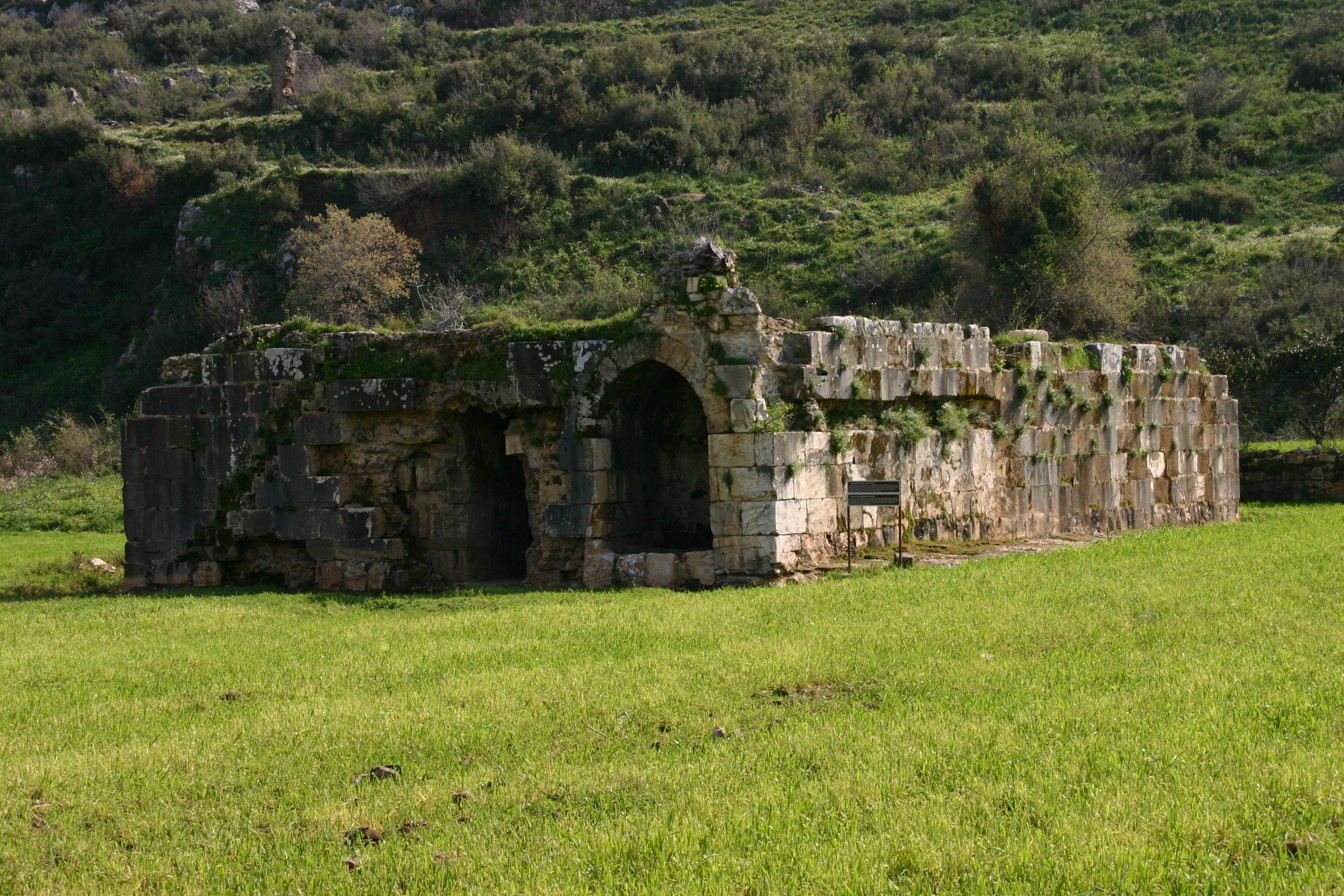
Trajan's Mausoleum

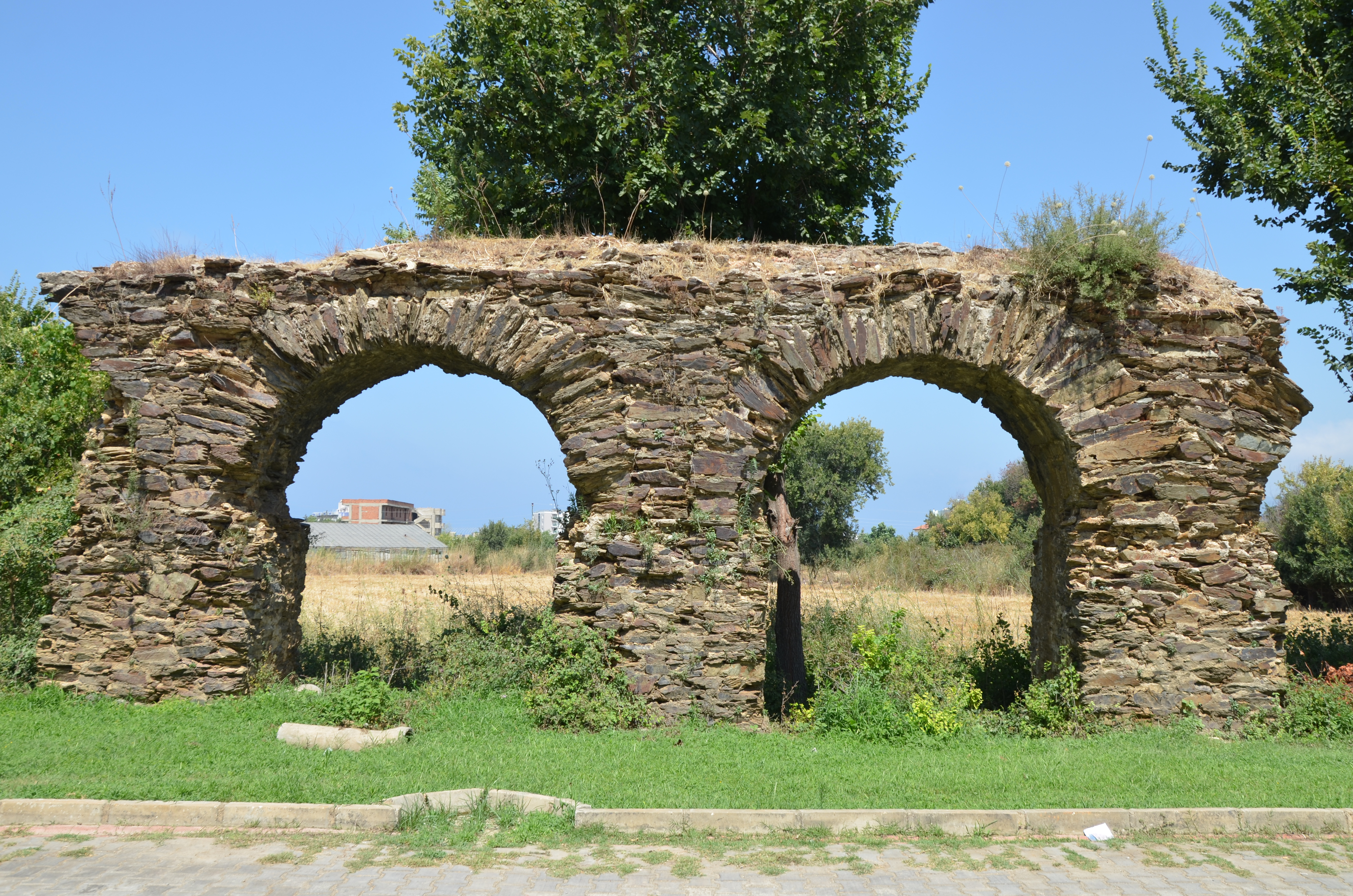
Aqueduct

== Sources ==
- Bryce, Trevor (2009). The Routledge Handbook of the Peoples and Places of Ancient Western Asia: From the Early Bronze Age to the Fall of the Persian Empire. London, United Kingdom: Routledge. ISBN 978-0-415-39485-7.
- Glassner, Jean-Jacques (2004). Foster, Benjamin R. (ed.). Mesopotamian Chronicles. Writings from the Ancient World. Vol. 19. Atlanta, United States: Society of Biblical Literature. ISBN 978-1-589-83090-5.
- Grayson, A.K. (1975). Assyrian and Babylonian Chronicles. Texts from Cuneiform Sources. Vol. 5. Locust Valley, United States: J. J. Augustin Publisher.
