= Pelitören, İvrindi =

Village in Turkey

Pelitören
- Neighbourhood
- Location in Turkey Pelitören (Marmara)
- Coordinates: 39.478°N 27.514°E
- Country: Turkey
- Province: Balıkesir
- District: İvrindi
- Population (2022): 155
- Time zone: UTC+3 (TRT)

Pelitören is a neighbourhood in the municipality and district of İvrindi, Balıkesir Province in Turkey. Its population is 155 (2022).
