= Osmanköy, İvrindi =

Village in Turkey

Osmanköy
- Neighbourhood
- Location in Turkey Osmanköy (Marmara)
- Coordinates: 39.484°N 27.484°E
- Country: Turkey
- Province: Balıkesir
- District: İvrindi
- Population (2022): 237
- Time zone: UTC+3 (TRT)

Osmanköy is a neighbourhood in the municipality and district of İvrindi, Balıkesir Province in Turkey. Its population is 237 (2022).
