= Erdel, İvrindi =

Village in Turkey

Erdel
- Neighbourhood
- Location in Turkey Erdel (Marmara)
- Coordinates: 39°32′30″N 27°36′06″E
- Country: Turkey
- Province: Balıkesir
- District: İvrindi
- Population (2022): 206
- Time zone: UTC+3 (TRT)

Erdel is a neighbourhood in the municipality and district of İvrindi, Balıkesir Province in Turkey. Its population is 206 (2022).
