= Göçük, Gazipaşa =

Göçük
- Neighbourhood
- Location in Turkey
- Coordinates: 36.1794°N 32.4732°E
- Country: Turkey
- Province: Antalya
- District: Gazipaşa
- Population (2022): 499
- Time zone: UTC+3 (TRT)

Göçük is a neighbourhood in the municipality and district of Gazipaşa, Antalya Province, Turkey. Its population is 499 (2022).
