= Akçal, İvrindi =

Village in Turkey

Akçal
- Neighbourhood
- Location in Turkey Akçal (Marmara)
- Coordinates: 39.600°N 27.559°E
- Country: Turkey
- Province: Balıkesir
- District: İvrindi
- Population (2022): 156
- Time zone: UTC+3 (TRT)

Akçal is a neighbourhood in the municipality and district of İvrindi, Balıkesir Province in Turkey. Its population is 156 (2022).
