= Macarköy, Gazipaşa =

Macarköy
- Neighbourhood
- Location in Turkey
- Coordinates: 36°14′N 32°21′E
- Country: Turkey
- Province: Antalya
- District: Gazipaşa
- Population (2022): 940
- Time zone: UTC+3 (TRT)

Macarköy is a neighbourhood in the municipality and district of Gazipaşa, Antalya Province, Turkey. Its population is 940 (2022).
