= Yaren, İvrindi =

Village in Turkey

Yaren
- Neighbourhood
- Location in Turkey Yaren (Marmara)
- Coordinates: 39°33′18″N 27°36′58″E
- Country: Turkey
- Province: Balıkesir
- District: İvrindi
- Population (2022): 109
- Time zone: UTC+3 (TRT)

Yaren is a neighbourhood in the municipality and district of İvrindi, Balıkesir Province in Turkey. Its population is 109 (2022).
