= Çobanlar, İvrindi =

Village in Turkey

Çobanlar
- Neighbourhood
- Location in Turkey Çobanlar (Marmara)
- Coordinates: 39.498°N 27.289°E
- Country: Turkey
- Province: Balıkesir
- District: İvrindi
- Population (2022): 340
- Time zone: UTC+3 (TRT)

Çobanlar is a neighbourhood in the municipality and district of İvrindi, Balıkesir Province in Turkey. Its population is 340 (2022).
