= Muzkent, Gazipaşa =

Muzkent
- Neighbourhood
- Location in Turkey
- Coordinates: 36°11′N 32°24′E
- Country: Turkey
- Province: Antalya
- District: Gazipaşa
- Population (2022): 872
- Time zone: UTC+3 (TRT)

Muzkent is a neighbourhood in the municipality and district of Gazipaşa, Antalya Province, Turkey. Its population is 872 (2022).
