= İnceğiz, Gazipaşa =

İnceğiz
- Neighbourhood
- Location in Turkey
- Coordinates: 36.3322°N 32.3337°E
- Country: Turkey
- Province: Antalya
- District: Gazipaşa
- Population (2022): 262
- Time zone: UTC+3 (TRT)

İnceğiz is a neighbourhood in the municipality and district of Gazipaşa, Antalya Province, Turkey. Its population is 262 (2022).
