= Hacıahmetler, İvrindi =

Village in Turkey

Hacıahmetler
- Neighbourhood
- Location in Turkey Hacıahmetler (Marmara)
- Coordinates: 39.488°N 27.262°E
- Country: Turkey
- Province: Balıkesir
- District: İvrindi
- Population (2022): 218
- Time zone: UTC+3 (TRT)

Hacıahmetler is a neighbourhood in the municipality and district of İvrindi, Balıkesir Province in Turkey. Its population is 218 (2022).
