= Haydarköy, İvrindi =

Village in Turkey

Haydarköy
- Neighbourhood
- Location in Turkey Haydarköy (Marmara)
- Coordinates: 39°25′10″N 27°19′22″E
- Country: Turkey
- Province: Balıkesir
- District: İvrindi
- Population (2022): 247
- Time zone: UTC+3 (TRT)

Haydarköy is a neighbourhood in the municipality and district of İvrindi, Balıkesir Province in Turkey. Its population is 247 (2022).
