= Mallıca, İvrindi =

Village in Turkey

Mallıca
- Neighbourhood
- Location in Turkey Mallıca (Marmara)
- Coordinates: 39.516°N 27.410°E
- Country: Turkey
- Province: Balıkesir
- District: İvrindi
- Population (2022): 376
- Time zone: UTC+3 (TRT)

Mallıca is a neighbourhood in the municipality and district of İvrindi, Balıkesir Province in Turkey. Its population is 376 (2022).
