= Çukuroba, İvrindi =

Village in Turkey

Çukuroba
- Neighbourhood
- Location in Turkey Çukuroba (Marmara)
- Coordinates: 39.503°N 27.580°E
- Country: Turkey
- Province: Balıkesir
- District: İvrindi
- Population (2022): 216
- Time zone: UTC+3 (TRT)

Çukuroba is a neighbourhood in the municipality and district of İvrindi, Balıkesir Province in Turkey. Its population is 216 (2022).
