= Cestrus =

City in the Roman province of Isauria, Asia Minor

Cestrus was a city in the Roman province of Isauria, in Asia Minor. Its placing within Isauria is given by Hierocles, Georgius Cyprius, and Parthey's (Notitiae episcopatuum). While recognizing what the ancient sources said, Le Quien supposed that the town, whose site has not been identified, took its name from the River Cestros and was thus in Pamphylia. Following Lequien's hypothesis, the 19th-century annual publication Gerarchia cattolica identified the town with "Ak-Sou", which Sophrone Pétridès called an odd mistake, since this is the name of the River Cestros, not of a city.

== Bishops ==
Bishop Epiphanius of Cestrus was present at the Council of Chalcedon in 451, and subscribed the joint letter of the bishops of Isauria to the emperor Leo I the Thracian in 458 concerning the killing of Proterius of Alexandria. The Jacobite Michael the Syrian reports that another, Elpidius, was a partisan of Severus of Antioch.

No longer a residential bishopric, Cestrus is today listed by the Catholic Church as a titular see.
