= Daşkənd =

Daşkənd or Dashkend, sometimes also romanized as Tashkend, may refer to:

- Daşkənd, in 1991 Ayrk, Armenia
- Daşkənd, Khojali, Azerbaijan
- Daşkənd, Yardymli, Azerbaijan
- Yeni Daşkənd, Azerbaijan
- Tashkent, a small village in Northern Cyprus

== See also ==
- Tashkent, Uzbekistan, also formerly romanized as Tashkend
- Tashkent (disambiguation)
- Taşkent
