= Tashkent (disambiguation) =

Tashkent is the capital of Uzbekistan.

It may also refer to:

== Places ==
- Tashkent, Tatyshlinsky District, Republic of Bashkortostan, Russia

== Other uses ==
- Tashkent (state), historic Uzbek monarchy
- Toshkent (Tashkent Metro)
- Tashkent (Soviet destroyer), Soviet Navy
- Tashkent (Russian cruiser)
- Tashkent (store), grocery store chain in New York City

== See also ==
- Taşkent, Turkey
- Daşkənd
- Baqi Tashqandi, Mughal commander believed to have built the Babri Masjid
