= Verkhnebaltachevo =

Verkhnebaltachevo Верхнебалтачево
- Village
- Location within Bashkortostan Location within Russia
- Coordinates: 56°12′N 56°05′E
- Country: Russia
- Region: Bashkortostan
- District: Tatyshlinsky District
- Time zone: UTC+5:00

Verkhnebaltachevo (Russian: Верхнебалтачево; Bashkir: Үрге Балтас, Ürge Baltas) is a rural locality (a village) in Nizhnebaltachevsky Selsoviet, Tatyshlinsky District, Bashkortostan, Russia. The population was 189 as of 2010. There are 4 streets.

== Geography ==
Verkhnebaltachevo is located 21 km southeast of Verkhniye Tatyshly (the district's administrative centre) by road. Dubovka is the nearest rural locality.
