= Balcılar =

Balcılar (literally "honey sellers" or "beekeepers") is a Turkish place name that may refer to the following places in Turkey:

- Balcılar, Bismil
- Balcılar, Çüngüş
- Balcılar, Gerede, a village in the district of Gerede, Bolu Province
- Balcılar, Kızılcahamam, a village in the district of Kızılcahamam, Ankara Province
- Balcılar, Lapseki
- Balcılar, Taşkent, a town in the district of Taşkent, Konya Province

== See also ==
- Balcı (disambiguation), the singular form
