= Stary Shardak =

Stary Shardak Старый Шардак
- Village
- Location within Bashkortostan Location within Russia
- Coordinates: 56°19′N 55°55′E
- Country: Russia
- Region: Bashkortostan
- District: Tatyshlinsky District
- Time zone: UTC+5:00

Stary Shardak (Russian: Старый Шардак; Bashkir: Иҫке Шарҙаҡ, İśke Şarźaq) is a rural locality (a village) in Kaltyayevsky Selsoviet, Tatyshlinsky District, Bashkortostan, Russia. The population was 85 as of 2010. There is 1 street.

== Geography ==
Stary Shardak is located 11 km northeast of Verkhniye Tatyshly (the district's administrative centre) by road. Verkhnyaya Salayevka is the nearest rural locality.
