= Çetmi (disambiguation) =

Çetmi can refer to:

- Çetmi
- Çetmi, Ezine
- Çetmi, İskilip
- Çetmi, Kargı
