= Bashkibash =

Bashkibash Башкибаш
- Selo
- Location within Bashkortostan Location within Russia
- Coordinates: 56°06′N 55°41′E
- Country: Russia
- Region: Bashkortostan
- District: Tatyshlinsky District
- Time zone: UTC+5:00

Bashkibash (Russian: Башкибаш; Bashkir: Башҡыбаш, Başqıbaş) is a rural locality (a selo) in Yalgyz-Naratsky Selsoviet, Tatyshlinsky District, Bashkortostan, Russia. The population was 252 as of 2010. There are 3 streets.

== Geography ==
Bashkibash is located 35 km southwest of Verkhniye Tatyshly (the district's administrative centre) by road. Yalgyz-Narat is the nearest rural locality.
