= Biz, Republic of Bashkortostan =

Biz Бизь
- Village
- Location within Bashkortostan Location within Russia
- Coordinates: 56°19′N 55°28′E
- Country: Russia
- Region: Bashkortostan
- District: Tatyshlinsky District
- Time zone: UTC+5:00

Biz (Russian: Бизь; Bashkir: Биҙ, Biź) is a rural locality (a village) in Aksaitovsky Selsoviet, Tatyshlinsky District, Bashkortostan, Russia. The population was 87 as of 2010. There is 1 street.

== Geography ==
Biz is located 28 km west of Verkhniye Tatyshly (the district's administrative centre) by road. Artaulovo is the nearest rural locality.
