= Utar-Yelga =

Utar-Yelga Утар-Елга
- Village
- Location within Bashkortostan Location within Russia
- Coordinates: 56°13′N 56°03′E
- Country: Russia
- Region: Bashkortostan
- District: Tatyshlinsky District
- Time zone: UTC+5:00

Utar-Yelga (Russian: Утар-Елга; Bashkir: Утарйылға, Utaryılğa) is a rural locality (a village) in Nizhnebaltachevsky Selsoviet, Tatyshlinsky District, Bashkortostan, Russia. The population was 54 as of 2010. There is 1 street.

== Geography ==
Utar-Yelga is located 19 km southeast of Verkhniye Tatyshly (the district's administrative centre) by road. Bigineyevo is the nearest rural locality.
