= Bigineyevo =

Bigineyevo Бигинеево
- Village
- Location within Bashkortostan Location within Russia
- Coordinates: 56°12′N 56°01′E
- Country: Russia
- Region: Bashkortostan
- District: Tatyshlinsky District
- Time zone: UTC+5:00

Bigineyevo (Russian: Бигинеево; Bashkir: Бигәнәй, Bigänäy) is a rural locality (a village) in Nizhnebaltachevsky Selsoviet, Tatyshlinsky District, Bashkortostan, Russia. The population was 205 as of 2010. There are 5 streets.

== Geography ==
Bigineyevo is located 16 km southeast of Verkhniye Tatyshly (the district's administrative centre) by road. Malaya Balzuga is the nearest rural locality.
