= Ilmetovo =

Ilmetovo Ильметово
- Selo
- Location within Bashkortostan Location within Russia
- Coordinates: 56°21′N 55°38′E
- Country: Russia
- Region: Bashkortostan
- District: Tatyshlinsky District
- Time zone: UTC+5:00

Ilmetovo (Russian: Ильметово; Bashkir: Илмәт, İlmät) is a rural locality (a selo) in Aksaitovsky Selsoviet, Tatyshlinsky District, Bashkortostan, Russia. The population was 380 as of 2010. There are 4 streets.

== Geography ==
Ilmetovo is located 18 km northwest of Verkhniye Tatyshly (the district's administrative centre) by road. Aksaitovo is the nearest rural locality.
