= Hallie =

Hallie may refer to:

== Places ==
- Hallie, Wisconsin, a town in the United States
  - Lake Hallie, Wisconsin, a village incorporated into the above town
- Hallie, Kentucky, an unincorporated community in the United States

== People ==
=== Given name ===
- Hallie (given name)

=== Surname ===
- Philip Hallie (1922–1994), American author
- Gerard Hallie (1911–2002), Dutch coxswain

== Fictional characters ==
- Hallie Clemens, in the American television series Rita Rocks
- Hallie Parker, in the 1998 film The Parent Trap
- Hallie Stokes, in the American soap opera Dark Shadows
- Hallie Takahama, a Marvel comics character known as Jolt

== See also ==
- Tropical Storm Hallie, one of two storms
- Halle (disambiguation)
- Halli (disambiguation)
- Hallı (disambiguation)
