= Managaz =

Managaz Манагаз
- Village
- Location within Bashkortostan Location within Russia
- Coordinates: 56°08′N 55°56′E
- Country: Russia
- Region: Bashkortostan
- District: Tatyshlinsky District
- Time zone: UTC+5:00

Managaz (Russian: Манагаз; Bashkir: Мәнәгәз, Mänägäz) is a rural locality (a village) in Kalmiyarovsky Selsoviet, Tatyshlinsky District, Bashkortostan, Russia. The population was 44 as of 2010. There is 1 street.

== Geography ==
Managaz is located 20 km south of Verkhniye Tatyshly (the district's administrative centre) by road. Savkiyaz is the nearest rural locality.
