= Savkiyaz =

Savkiyaz Савкияз
- Selo
- Location within Bashkortostan Location within Russia
- Coordinates: 56°09′N 55°55′E
- Country: Russia
- Region: Bashkortostan
- District: Tatyshlinsky District
- Time zone: UTC+5:00

Savkiyaz (Russian: Савкияз; Bashkir: Сәүкияҙ, Säwkiyaź) is a rural locality (a selo) in Kalmiyarovsky Selsoviet, Tatyshlinsky District, Bashkortostan, Russia. The population was 249 as of 2010. There are 4 streets.

== Geography ==
Savkiyaz is located 18 km south of Verkhniye Tatyshly (the district's administrative centre) by road. Maysk is the nearest rural locality.
