= Starochukurovo =

Starochukurovo Старочукурово
- Selo
- Location within Bashkortostan Location within Russia
- Coordinates: 56°19′N 55°39′E
- Country: Russia
- Region: Bashkortostan
- District: Tatyshlinsky District
- Time zone: UTC+5:00

Starochukurovo (Russian: Старочукурово; Bashkir: Иҫке Соҡор, İśke Soqor) is a rural locality (a selo) in Bul-Kaypanovsky Selsoviet, Tatyshlinsky District, Bashkortostan, Russia. The population was 101 as of 2010. There are 5 streets.

== Geography ==
Starochukurovo is located 18 km northwest of Verkhniye Tatyshly (the district's administrative centre) by road. Mamatayevo is the nearest rural locality.
