= Ivanovka, Tatyshlinsky District, Republic of Bashkortostan =

Ivanovka Ивановка
- Village
- Location within Bashkortostan Location within Russia
- Coordinates: 56°15′N 56°08′E
- Country: Russia
- Region: Bashkortostan
- District: Tatyshlinsky District
- Time zone: UTC+5:00

Ivanovka (Russian: Ивановка) is a rural locality (a village) in Nizhnebaltachevsky Selsoviet, Tatyshlinsky District, Bashkortostan, Russia. The population was 142 as of 2010. There are 3 streets.

== Geography ==
Ivanovka is located 27 km southeast of Verkhniye Tatyshly (the district's administrative centre) by road. Stary Kyzyl-Yar is the nearest rural locality.
