= Starokaypanovo =

Starokaypanovo Старокайпаново
- Selo
- Location within Bashkortostan Location within Russia
- Coordinates: 56°22′N 55°44′E
- Country: Russia
- Region: Bashkortostan
- District: Tatyshlinsky District
- Time zone: UTC+5:00

Starokaypanovo (Russian: Старокайпаново; Bashkir: Иҫке Ҡайпан, İśke Qaypan) is a rural locality (a selo) in Bul-Kaypanovsky Selsoviet, Tatyshlinsky District, Bashkortostan, Russia. The population was 357 as of 2010. There are 4 streets.

== Geography ==
Starokaypanovo is located 15 km northwest of Verkhniye Tatyshly (the district's administrative centre) by road. Novokaypanovo is the nearest rural locality.
