= Tanyp-Chishma =

Tanyp-Chishma Танып-Чишма
- Village
- Location within Bashkortostan Location within Russia
- Coordinates: 56°16′N 56°04′E
- Country: Russia
- Region: Bashkortostan
- District: Tatyshlinsky District
- Time zone: UTC+5:00

Tanyp-Chishma (Russian: Танып-Чишма; Bashkir: Танып-Шишмә, Tanıp-Şişmä) is a rural locality (a village) in Nizhnebaltachevsky Selsoviet, Tatyshlinsky District, Bashkortostan, Russia. The population was 18 as of 2010. There is 1 street.

== Geography ==
Tanyp-Chishma is located 17 km east of Verkhniye Tatyshly (the district's administrative centre) by road. Nizhneye Kaltayevo is the nearest rural locality.
