= 1st Zirimzibash =

1st Zirimzibash 1-й Зиримзибаш 1-се Еремйәбаш 1-se Yeremyäbaş
- Village
- Location within Bashkortostan Location within Russia
- Coordinates: 56.253889°N 55.53°E
- Country: Russia
- Region: Bashkortostan
- District: Tatyshlinsky District
- Time zone: UTC+05:00

1st Zirimzibash (Russian: 1-й Зиримзибаш; Bashkir: 1-се Еремйәбаш, 1-se Yeremyäbaş) is a rural locality (a village) in Kurdymsky Selsoviet of Tatyshlinsky District, Russia. The population was 106 as of 2010.

== Geography ==
1st Zirimzibash is located 23 km west of Verkhniye Tatyshly (the district's administrative centre) by road. Stary Kurdym is the nearest rural locality.

== Ethnicity ==
The village is inhabited by Bashkirs and other ethnic groups.

== Streets ==
- Lesnaya
- Tsentralnaya
