= Badryashevo =

Badryashevo Бадряшево
- Village
- Location within Bashkortostan Location within Russia
- Coordinates: 56°22′N 55°52′E
- Country: Russia
- Region: Bashkortostan
- District: Tatyshlinsky District
- Time zone: UTC+5:00

Badryashevo (Russian: Бадряшево; Bashkir: Бәҙрәш, Bäźräş) is a rural locality (a village) and the administrative centre of Badryashevsky Selsoviet, Tatyshlinsky District, Bashkortostan, Russia. The population was 361 as of 2010. There are 6 streets.

== Geography ==
Badryashevo is located 11 km north of Verkhniye Tatyshly (the district's administrative centre) by road. Auk-Bulyak is the nearest rural locality.
