= Novokaypanovo =

Novokaypanovo Новокайпаново
- Selo
- Location within Bashkortostan Location within Russia
- Coordinates: 56°20′N 55°46′E
- Country: Russia
- Region: Bashkortostan
- District: Tatyshlinsky District
- Time zone: UTC+5:00

Novokaypanovo (Russian: Новокайпаново; Bashkir: Яңы Ҡайпан, Yañı Qaypan) is a rural locality (a selo) in Bul-Kaypanovsky Selsoviet, Tatyshlinsky District, Bashkortostan, Russia. The population was 485 as of 2010. There are five streets.

== Geography ==
Novokaypanovo is located 9 km northwest of Verkhniye Tatyshly (the district's administrative centre) by road. Bul-Kaypanovo is the nearest rural locality.
