= Artaulovo =

Artaulovo Артаулово
- Village
- Location within Bashkortostan Location within Russia
- Coordinates: 56°20′N 55°30′E
- Country: Russia
- Region: Bashkortostan
- District: Tatyshlinsky District
- Time zone: UTC+5:00

Artaulovo (Russian: Артаулово; Bashkir: Артауыл, Artawıl) is a rural locality (a village) in Aksaitovsky Selsoviet, Tatyshlinsky District, Bashkortostan, Russia. The population was 221 as of 2010. There are 2 streets.

== Geography ==
Artaulovo is located 27 km northwest of Verkhniye Tatyshly (the district's administrative centre) by road. Soyuz is the nearest rural locality.
