= Belyashevo =

Belyashevo Беляшево
- Selo
- Location within Bashkortostan Location within Russia
- Coordinates: 56°25′N 55°53′E
- Country: Russia
- Region: Bashkortostan
- District: Tatyshlinsky District
- Time zone: UTC+5:00

Belyashevo (Russian: Беляшево; Bashkir: Беләш, Beläş) is a rural locality (a selo) in Badryashevsky Selsoviet, Tatyshlinsky District, Bashkortostan, Russia. The population was 469 as of 2010. There are 7 streets.

== Geography ==
Belyashevo is located 16 km north of Verkhniye Tatyshly (the district's administrative centre) by road. Badryashevo is the nearest rural locality.
