= Alga, Tatyshlinsky District, Republic of Bashkortostan =

Alga Алга
- Village
- Location within Bashkortostan Location within Russia
- Coordinates: 56°12′N 56°03′E
- Country: Russia
- Region: Bashkortostan
- District: Tatyshlinsky District
- Time zone: UTC+5:00

Alga (Russian: Алга; Bashkir: Алға, Alğa) is a rural locality (a village) in Nizhnebaltachevsky Selsoviet, Tatyshlinsky District, Bashkortostan, Russia. The population was 60 as of 2010. There is 1 street.

== Geography ==
Alga is located 26 km southeast of Verkhniye Tatyshly (the district's administrative centre) by road. Nizhnebaltachevo is the nearest rural locality.
