= Novyye Irakty =

Novyye Irakty Новые Иракты
- Village
- Location within Bashkortostan Location within Russia
- Coordinates: 56°16′N 55°32′E
- Country: Russia
- Region: Bashkortostan
- District: Tatyshlinsky District
- Time zone: UTC+5:00

Novyye Irakty (Russian: Новые Иракты; Bashkir: Яңы Ирәкте, Yañı İräkte) is a rural locality (a village) in Kudashevsky Selsoviet, Tatyshlinsky District, Bashkortostan, Russia. The population was 11 as of 2010. There is 1 street.

== Geography ==
Novyye Irakty is located 20 km west of Verkhniye Tatyshly (the district's administrative centre) by road. 1-y Yanaul is the nearest rural locality.
