= Aribash =

Aribash Арибаш
- Village
- Location within Bashkortostan Location within Russia
- Coordinates: 56°15′N 55°46′E
- Country: Russia
- Region: Bashkortostan
- District: Tatyshlinsky District
- Time zone: UTC+5:00

Aribash (Russian: Арибаш; Bashkir: Әрибаш, Äribaş) is a rural locality (a village) in Kudashevsky Selsoviet, Tatyshlinsky District, Bashkortostan, Russia. The population was 552 as of 2010. There are 9 streets.

== Geography ==
Aribash is located 8 km southwest of Verkhniye Tatyshly (the district's administrative centre) by road. Aribashevo is the nearest rural locality.
