= Stary Kyzyl-Yar =

Stary Kyzyl-Yar Старый Кызыл-Яр
- Village
- Location within Bashkortostan Location within Russia
- Coordinates: 56°14′N 56°09′E
- Country: Russia
- Region: Bashkortostan
- District: Tatyshlinsky District
- Time zone: UTC+5:00

Stary Kyzyl-Yar (Russian: Старый Кызыл-Яр; Bashkir: Иҫке Ҡыҙылъяр, İśke Qıźılyar) is a rural locality (a village) in Nizhnebaltachevsky Selsoviet, Tatyshlinsky District, Bashkortostan, Russia. The population was 201 as of 2010. There are 2 streets.

== Geography ==
Stary Kyzyl-Yar is located 26 km southeast of Verkhniye Tatyshly (the district's administrative centre) by road. Ivanovka is the nearest rural locality.
