= Urazgildy =

Urazgildy Уразгильды
- Selo
- Location within Bashkortostan Location within Russia
- Coordinates: 56°15′N 55°52′E
- Country: Russia
- Region: Bashkortostan
- District: Tatyshlinsky District
- Time zone: UTC+5:00

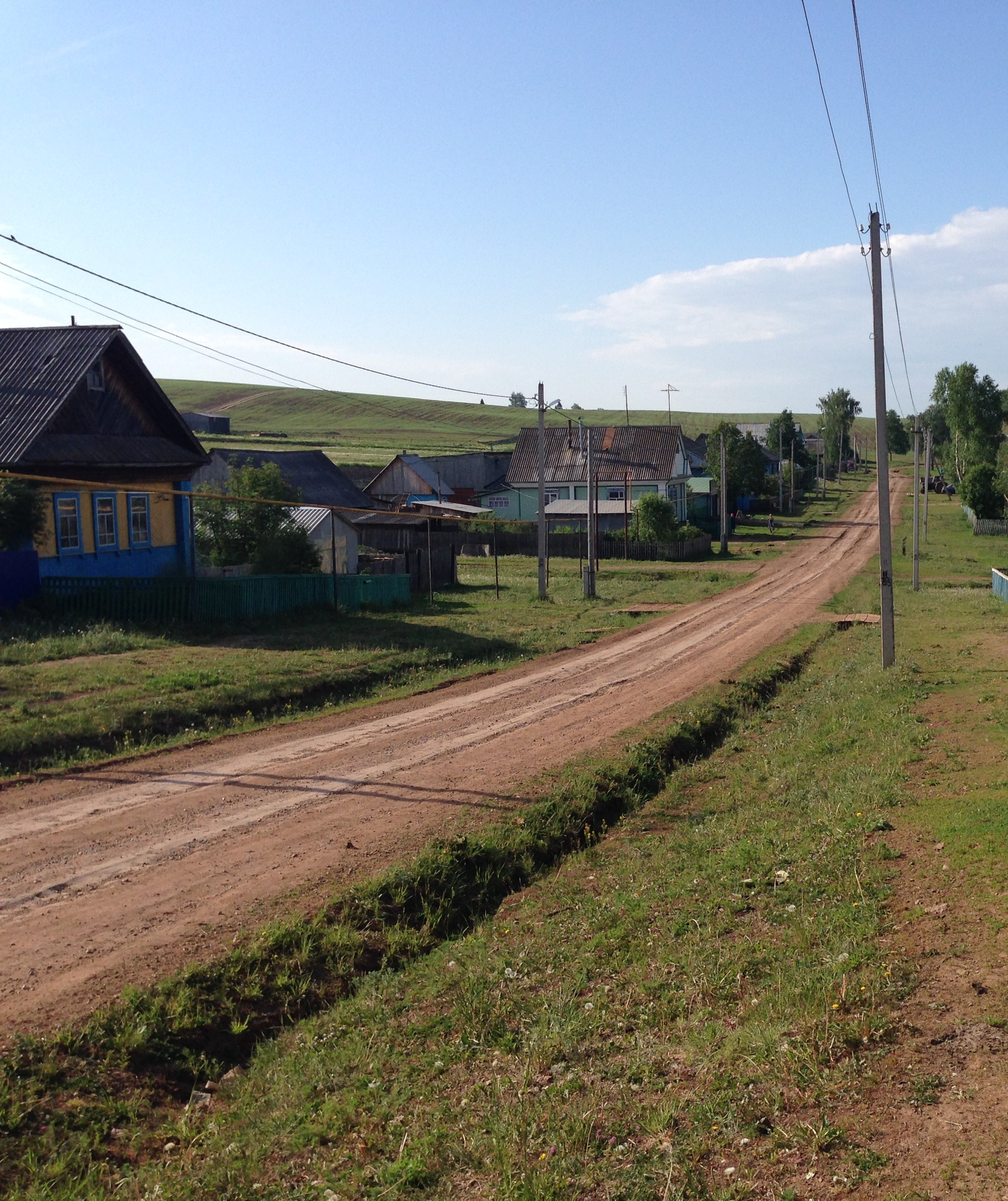
The Main Street of Urazgildy

Urazgildy (Russian: Уразгильды; Bashkir: Ураҙгилде, Uraźgilde) is a rural locality (a selo) in Novotatyshlinsky Selsoviet, Tatyshlinsky District, Bashkortostan, Russia. The population was 471 as of 2010. There are 6 streets.

== Geography ==
Urazgildy is located 5 km south of Verkhniye Tatyshly (the district's administrative centre) by road. Verkhniye Tatyshly is the nearest rural locality.
