= Garibashevo =

Garibashevo Гарибашево
- Village
- Location within Bashkortostan Location within Russia
- Coordinates: 56°10′N 55°34′E
- Country: Russia
- Region: Bashkortostan
- District: Tatyshlinsky District
- Time zone: UTC+5:00

Garibashevo (Russian: Гарибашево; Bashkir: Гәрәбаш, Gäräbaş) is a rural locality (a village) in Shulganovsky Selsoviet, Tatyshlinsky District, Bashkortostan, Russia. The population was 446 as of 2010. There are 8 streets.

== Geography ==
Garibashevo is located 42 km southwest of Verkhniye Tatyshly (the district's administrative centre) by road. Chishma is the nearest rural locality.
