= Achu-Yelga =

Achu-Yelga Ачу-Елга
- Village
- Location within Bashkortostan Location within Russia
- Coordinates: 56°17′N 55°22′E
- Country: Russia
- Region: Bashkortostan
- District: Tatyshlinsky District
- Time zone: UTC+5:00

Achu-Yelga (Russian: Ачу-Елга; Bashkir: Асыуйылға, Asıwyılğa) is a rural locality (a village) in Kurdymsky Selsoviet, Tatyshlinsky District, Bashkortostan, Russia. The population was 69 as of 2010. There is 1 street.

== Geography ==
Achu-Yelga is located 35 km west of Verkhniye Tatyshly (the district's administrative centre) by road. Verkhnyaya Barabanovka is the nearest rural locality.
