= Kustarevka =

Kustarevka (Russian: Кустаревка) is the name of several rural localities in Russia:

- Kustarevka, Republic of Bashkortostan, a village in Tatyshlinsky District of the Republic of Bashkortostan
- Kustarevka, Ryazan Oblast, a settlement in Sasovsky District of Ryazan Oblast
