= Zirimzibash =

Zirimzibash may refer to:

- 1st Zirimzibash, Bashkortostan
- 2nd Zirimzibash, Bashkortostan
