= Karaburun (disambiguation) =

Karaburun is a district and the center town of the same district of İzmir Province, Turkey.

Karaburun or Karaburnu (literally "black nose" or "black cape") is a Turkish place name. It may also refer to:

- Karaburun Peninsula, Albania, a peninsula in Albania
- Karaburun Peninsula, Turkey, a peninsula in Turkey
- Karaburun, Arnavutköy, a seaside resort in Istanbul Province, Turkey
- Karaburun, Gölbaşı, a village in the district of Gölbaşı, Adıyaman Province, Turkey
- Karaburun, İskilip, a village in İskilip district of Çorum Province, Turkey
- Karaburun (Bozburun), a cape in the peninsula of Bozburun, Turkey, delimiting the Aegean and the East Mediterranean Sea
- (Great) Karaburnu, Halkidiki or Megalo Embolo, a cape near Thessaloniki, Greece
- Mikro Karabournou 'Small Karaburnu', Karabournaki, or Mikro Embolo, a cape near Thessaloniki, Greece

== See also ==
- Karaburun Peninsula (disambiguation)
- Karaburun tragedy
