= Sarashtybash =

Sarashtybash Сараштыбаш
- Selo
- Location within Bashkortostan Location within Russia
- Coordinates: 56°15′N 55°24′E
- Country: Russia
- Region: Bashkortostan
- District: Tatyshlinsky District
- Time zone: UTC+5:00

Sarashtybash (Russian: Сараштыбаш; Bashkir: Сараштыбаш, Saraştıbaş) is a rural locality (a selo) in Kurdymsky Selsoviet, Tatyshlinsky District, Bashkortostan, Russia. The population was 189 as of 2010. There are 2 streets.

== Geography ==
Sarashtybash is located 30 km west of Verkhniye Tatyshly (the district's administrative centre) by road. 2-y Zirimzibash is the nearest rural locality.
