= Aksaitovo =

Aksaitovo Аксаитово
- Selo
- Location within Bashkortostan Location within Russia
- Coordinates: 56°21′N 55°35′E
- Country: Russia
- Region: Bashkortostan
- District: Tatyshlinsky District
- Time zone: UTC+5:00

Aksaitovo (Russian: Аксаитово; Bashkir: Аҡсәйет, Aqsäyet) is a rural locality (a selo) and the administrative centre of Aksaitovsky Selsoviet, Tatyshlinsky District, Bashkortostan, Russia. The population was 794 as of 2010. There are 11 streets.

== Geography ==
Aksaitovo is located 21 km northwest of Verkhniye Tatyshly (the district's administrative centre) by road. Ilmetovo is the nearest rural locality.
