= Verkhnekudashevo =

Verkhnekudashevo Верхнекудашево
- Selo
- Location within Bashkortostan Location within Russia
- Coordinates: 56°17′N 55°41′E
- Country: Russia
- Region: Bashkortostan
- District: Tatyshlinsky District
- Time zone: UTC+5:00

Verkhnekudashevo (Russian: Верхнекудашево; Bashkir: Үрге Ҡоҙаш, Ürge Qoźaş) is a rural locality (a selo) and the administrative centre of Kudashevsky Selsoviet, Tatyshlinsky District, Bashkortostan, Russia. The population was 789 as of 2010. There are 13 streets.

== Geography ==
Verkhnekudashevo is located 11 km west of Verkhniye Tatyshly (the district's administrative centre) by road. Kardagushevo is the nearest rural locality.
