= Staroakbulatovo, Tatyshlinsky District, Republic of Bashkortostan =

Staroakbulatovo Староакбулатово
- Selo
- Location within Bashkortostan Location within Russia
- Coordinates: 56°07′N 55°35′E
- Country: Russia
- Region: Bashkortostan
- District: Tatyshlinsky District
- Time zone: UTC+5:00

Staroakbulatovo (Russian: Староакбулатово; Bashkir: Иҫке Аҡбулат, İśke Aqbulat) is a rural locality (a selo) and the administrative centre of Akbulatovsky Selsoviet, Tatyshlinsky District, Bashkortostan, Russia. The population was 426 as of 2010. There are 10 streets.

== Geography ==
Staroakbulatovo is located 43 km southwest of Verkhniye Tatyshly (the district's administrative centre) by road. Savaleyevo is the nearest rural locality.
