= Kashkakovo =

Kashkakovo Кашкаково
- Village
- Location within Bashkortostan Location within Russia
- Coordinates: 56°06′N 55°27′E
- Country: Russia
- Region: Bashkortostan
- District: Tatyshlinsky District
- Time zone: UTC+5:00

Kashkakovo (Russian: Кашкаково; Bashkir: Ҡашҡаҡ, Qaşqaq) is a rural locality (a village) in Shulganovsky Selsoviet, Tatyshlinsky District, Bashkortostan, Russia. The population was 481 as of 2010. There are 9 streets.

== Geography ==
Kashkakovo is located 42 km southwest of Verkhniye Tatyshly (the district's administrative centre) by road. Verkhny Chat is the nearest rural locality.
