= Malaya Balzuga =

Malaya Balzuga Малая Бальзуга
- Village
- Location within Bashkortostan Location within Russia
- Coordinates: 56°12′N 56°00′E
- Country: Russia
- Region: Bashkortostan
- District: Tatyshlinsky District
- Time zone: UTC+5:00

Malaya Balzuga (Russian: Малая Бальзуга; Bashkir: Бәләкәй Бәлзүгә, Bäläkäy Bälzügä) is a rural locality (a village) in Novotatyshlinsky Selsoviet, Tatyshlinsky District, Bashkortostan, Russia. The population was 246 as of 2010. There are 2 streets.

== Geography ==
Malaya Balzuga is located 15 km southeast of Verkhniye Tatyshly (the district's administrative centre) by road. Bigineyevo is the nearest rural locality.
