= Churguldy =

Churguldy Чургулды
- Selo
- Location within Bashkortostan Location within Russia
- Coordinates: 56°08′N 55°38′E
- Country: Russia
- Region: Bashkortostan
- District: Tatyshlinsky District
- Time zone: UTC+5:00

Churguldy (Russian: Чургулды; Bashkir: Сорғолдо, Sorğoldo) is a rural locality (a selo) in Akbulatovsky Selsoviet, Tatyshlinsky District, Bashkortostan, Russia. The population was 488 as of 2010. There are 6 streets.

== Geography ==
Churguldy is located 38 km southwest of Verkhniye Tatyshly (the district's administrative centre) by road. Staroakbulatovo is the nearest rural locality.
