= Yuda, Tatyshlinsky District, Republic of Bashkortostan =

Yuda Юда
- Village
- Location within Bashkortostan Location within Russia
- Coordinates: 56°21′N 55°53′E
- Country: Russia
- Region: Bashkortostan
- District: Tatyshlinsky District
- Time zone: UTC+5:00

Yuda (Bashkir and Russian: Юда) is a rural locality (a village) in Badryashevsky Selsoviet, Tatyshlinsky District, Bashkortostan, Russia. The population was 186 as of 2010. There are 2 streets.

== Geography ==
Yuda is located 9 km north of Verkhniye Tatyshly (the district's administrative centre) by road. Badryashevo is the nearest rural locality.
