= Verkhnyaya Salayevka =

Verkhnyaya Salayevka Верхняя Салаевка
- Village
- Location within Bashkortostan Location within Russia
- Coordinates: 56°21′N 55°56′E
- Country: Russia
- Region: Bashkortostan
- District: Tatyshlinsky District
- Time zone: UTC+5:00

Verkhnyaya Salayevka (Russian: Верхняя Салаевка; Bashkir: Үрге Сәләй, Ürge Säläy) is a rural locality (a village) in Badryashevsky Selsoviet, Tatyshlinsky District, Bashkortostan, Russia. The population was 3 as of 2010. There is 1 street.

== Geography ==
Verkhnyaya Salayevka is located 13 km northeast of Verkhniye Tatyshly (the district's administrative centre) by road. Yuda is the nearest rural locality.
