= Uyadybash =

Uyadybash Уядыбаш
- Village
- Location within Bashkortostan Location within Russia
- Coordinates: 56°15′N 55°49′E
- Country: Russia
- Region: Bashkortostan
- District: Tatyshlinsky District
- Time zone: UTC+5:00

Uyadybash (Russian: Уядыбаш; Bashkir: Уяҙыбаш, Uyaźıbaş) is a rural locality (a village) in Verkhnetatyshlinsky Selsoviet, Tatyshlinsky District, Bashkortostan, Russia. The population was 26 as of 2010. There is 1 street.

== Geography ==
Uyadybash is located 5 km southwest of Verkhniye Tatyshly (the district's administrative centre) by road. Verkhniye Tatyshly is the nearest rural locality.
