= Aribashevo =

Aribashevo Арибашево
- Selo
- Location within Bashkortostan Location within Russia
- Coordinates: 56°14′N 55°45′E
- Country: Russia
- Region: Bashkortostan
- District: Tatyshlinsky District
- Time zone: UTC+5:00

Aribashevo (Russian: Арибашево; Bashkir: Әри башы, Äri başı) is a rural locality (a selo) in Kudashevsky Selsoviet, Tatyshlinsky District, Bashkortostan, Russia. The population was 273 as of 2010. There are 2 streets.

== Geography ==
Aribashevo is located 9 km southwest of Verkhniye Tatyshly (the district's administrative centre) by road. Aribash is the nearest rural locality.
