= Fanga, Republic of Bashkortostan =

Fanga Фанга
- Village
- Location within Bashkortostan Location within Russia
- Coordinates: 56°17′N 55°59′E
- Country: Russia
- Region: Bashkortostan
- District: Tatyshlinsky District
- Time zone: UTC+5:00

Fanga (Russian: Фанга; Bashkir: Фәнгә, Fängä) is a rural locality (a village) in Kaltyayevsky Selsoviet, Tatyshlinsky District, Bashkortostan, Russia. The population was 2 as of 2010. There is 1 street.

== Geography ==
Fanga is located 11 km east of Verkhniye Tatyshly (the district's administrative centre) by road. Kaltyayevo is the nearest rural locality.
