= Zilyaktau =

Zilyaktau Зиляктау
- Village
- Location within Bashkortostan Location within Russia
- Coordinates: 56°11′N 55°30′E
- Country: Russia
- Region: Bashkortostan
- District: Tatyshlinsky District
- Time zone: UTC+5:00

Zilyaktau (Russian: Зиляктау; Bashkir: Еләктау, Yeläktaw) is a rural locality (a village) in Shulganovsky Selsoviet, Tatyshlinsky District, Bashkortostan, Russia. The population was 11 as of 2010. There is 1 street.

== Geography ==
Zilyaktau is located 34 km southwest of Verkhniye Tatyshly (the district's administrative centre) by road. Salikhovo is the nearest rural locality.
