= Novyye Tatyshly =

Novyye Tatyshly Новые Татышлы
- Selo
- Location within Bashkortostan Location within Russia
- Coordinates: 56°13′N 55°56′E
- Country: Russia
- Region: Bashkortostan
- District: Tatyshlinsky District
- Time zone: UTC+5:00

Novyye Tatyshly (Russian: Новые Татышлы; Bashkir: Яңы Тәтешле, Yañı Täteşle) is a rural locality (a selo) and the administrative centre of Novotatyshlinsky Selsoviet, Tatyshlinsky District, Bashkortostan, Russia. The population was 550 as of 2010. There are 4 streets.

== Geography ==
Novyye Tatyshly is located 10 km southeast of Verkhniye Tatyshly (the district's administrative centre) by road. Malaya Balzuga is the nearest rural locality.
