= Bul-Kaypanovo =

Bul-Kaypanovo Буль-Кайпаново
- Selo
- Location within Bashkortostan Location within Russia
- Coordinates: 56°19′N 55°47′E
- Country: Russia
- Region: Bashkortostan
- District: Tatyshlinsky District
- Time zone: UTC+5:00

Bul-Kaypanovo (Russian: Буль-Кайпаново; Bashkir: Бүл-Ҡайпан, Bül-Qaypan) is a rural locality (a selo) and the administrative centre of Bul-Kaypanovsky Selsoviet, Tatyshlinsky District, Bashkortostan, Russia. The population was 682 as of 2010. There are 11 streets.

== Geography ==
Bul-Kaypanovo is located 7 km northwest of Verkhniye Tatyshly (the district's administrative centre) by road. Novokaypanovo is the nearest rural locality.
