= Auk-Bulyak =

Auk-Bulyak Аук-Буляк
- Village
- Location within Bashkortostan Location within Russia
- Coordinates: 56°22′N 55°51′E
- Country: Russia
- Region: Bashkortostan
- District: Tatyshlinsky District
- Time zone: UTC+5:00

Auk-Bulyak (Russian: Аук-Буляк; Bashkir: Ауыҡ-Бүләк, Awıq-Büläk) is a rural locality (a village) in Badryashevsky Selsoviet, Tatyshlinsky District, Bashkortostan, Russia. The population was 113 as of 2010. There are 3 streets.

== Geography ==
Auk-Bulyak is located 9 km north of Verkhniye Tatyshly (the district's administrative centre) by road. Badryashevo is the nearest rural locality.
