= Starosoldovo =

Starosoldovo Старосолдово
- Village
- Location within Bashkortostan Location within Russia
- Coordinates: 56°25′N 55°45′E
- Country: Russia
- Region: Bashkortostan
- District: Tatyshlinsky District
- Time zone: UTC+5:00

Starosoldovo (Russian: Старосолдово; Bashkir: Иҫке Салдау, İśke Saldaw) is a rural locality (a village) in Badryashevsky Selsoviet, Tatyshlinsky District, Bashkortostan, Russia. The population was 134 as of 2010. There are 3 streets.

== Geography ==
Starosoldovo is located 22 km north of Verkhniye Tatyshly (the district's administrative centre) by road. Kalmiyary is the nearest rural locality.
