= Yusupovo, Tatyshlinsky District, Republic of Bashkortostan =

Yusupovo Юсупово
- Village
- Location within Bashkortostan Location within Russia
- Coordinates: 56°18′N 55°28′E
- Country: Russia
- Region: Bashkortostan
- District: Tatyshlinsky District
- Time zone: UTC+5:00

Yusupovo (Russian: Юсупово; Bashkir: Йосоп, Yosop) is a rural locality (a village) in Aksaitovsky Selsoviet, Tatyshlinsky District, Bashkortostan, Russia. The population was 196 as of 2010. There are two streets.

== Geography ==
Yusupovo is located 26 km west of Verkhniye Tatyshly (the district's administrative centre) by road. Biz is the nearest rural locality.
