= Nizhneye Kaltyayevo =

Nizhneye Kaltyayevo Нижнее Кальтяево
- Village
- Location within Bashkortostan Location within Russia
- Coordinates: 56°16′N 55°59′E
- Country: Russia
- Region: Bashkortostan
- District: Tatyshlinsky District
- Time zone: UTC+5:00

Nizhneye Kaltyayevo (Russian: Нижнее Кальтяево; Bashkir: Түбәнге Кәлтәй, Tübänge Kältäy) is a rural locality (a village) in Kaltyayevsky Selsoviet, Tatyshlinsky District, Bashkortostan, Russia. The population was 41 as of 2010. There is 1 street.

== Geography ==
Nizhneye Kaltyayevo is located 11 km southeast of Verkhniye Tatyshly (the district's administrative centre) by road. Vyazovka is the nearest rural locality.
