= Novochukurovo =

Novochukurovo Новочукурово
- Village
- Location within Bashkortostan Location within Russia
- Coordinates: 56°19′N 55°36′E
- Country: Russia
- Region: Bashkortostan
- District: Tatyshlinsky District
- Time zone: UTC+5:00

Novochukurovo (Russian: Новочукурово; Bashkir: Яңы Соҡор, Yañı Soqor) is a rural locality (a village) in Aksaitovsky Selsoviet, Tatyshlinsky District, Bashkortostan, Russia. The population was 98 as of 2010. There are 2 streets.

== Geography ==
Novochukurovo is located 26 km northwest of Verkhniye Tatyshly (the district's administrative centre) by road. Zirimzi is the nearest rural locality.
