= Kaltyayevo =

Kaltyayevo Кальтяево
- Selo
- Location within Bashkortostan Location within Russia
- Coordinates: 56°16′N 55°56′E
- Country: Russia
- Region: Bashkortostan
- District: Tatyshlinsky District
- Time zone: UTC+5:00

Kaltyayevo (Russian: Кальтяево; Bashkir: Ҡәлтәү, Qältäw) is a rural locality (a selo) and the administrative centre of Kaltyayevsky Selsoviet, Tatyshlinsky District, Bashkortostan, Russia. The population was 573 as of 2010. There are six streets.

== Geography ==
Kaltyayevo is located 7 km southeast of Verkhniye Tatyshly (the district's administrative centre) by road. Vyazovka is the nearest rural locality.
