= Yurmiyazbash =

Yurmiyazbash Юрмиязбаш
- Village
- Location within Bashkortostan Location within Russia
- Coordinates: 56°13′N 55°30′E
- Country: Russia
- Region: Bashkortostan
- District: Tatyshlinsky District
- Time zone: UTC+5:00

Yurmiyazbash (Russian: Юрмиязбаш; Bashkir: Юрмияҙбаш, Yurmiyaźbaş) is a rural locality (a village) in Kurdymsky Selsoviet, Tatyshlinsky District, Bashkortostan, Russia. The population was 72 as of 2010. There are 2 streets.

== Geography ==
Yurmiyazbash is located 26 km southwest of Verkhniye Tatyshly (the district's administrative centre) by road. Stary Kurdym is the nearest rural locality.
