= Nizhnebaltachevo =

Nizhnebaltachevo Нижнебалтачево
- Selo
- Location within Bashkortostan Location within Russia
- Coordinates: 56°12′N 56°06′E
- Country: Russia
- Region: Bashkortostan
- District: Tatyshlinsky District
- Time zone: UTC+5:00

Nizhnebaltachevo (Russian: Нижнебалтачево; Bashkir: Түбәнге Балтас, Tübänge Baltas) is a rural locality (a selo) and the administrative centre of Nizhnebaltachevsky Selsoviet, Tatyshlinsky District, Bashkortostan, Russia. The population was 739 as of 2010. There are 7 streets.

== Geography ==
Nizhnebaltachevo is located 22 km southeast of Verkhniye Tatyshly (the district's administrative centre) by road. Verkhnebaltachevo is the nearest rural locality.
