= Yalgyz-Narat =

Yalgyz-Narat Ялгыз-Нарат
- Selo
- Location within Bashkortostan Location within Russia
- Coordinates: 56°08′N 55°44′E
- Country: Russia
- Region: Bashkortostan
- District: Tatyshlinsky District
- Time zone: UTC+5:00

Yalgyz-Narat (Russian: Ялгыз-Нарат; Bashkir: Яңғыҙнарат, Yañğıźnarat) is a rural locality (a selo) and the administrative centre of Yalgyz-Naratsky Selsoviet, Tatyshlinsky District, Bashkortostan, Russia. The population was 462 as of 2010. There are 9 streets.

== Geography ==
Yalgyz-Narat is located 31 km southwest of Verkhniye Tatyshly (the district's administrative centre) by road. Bashkibash is the nearest rural locality.
