= Mamatayevo =

Mamatayevo Маматаево
- Village
- Location within Bashkortostan Location within Russia
- Coordinates: 56°20′N 55°42′E
- Country: Russia
- Region: Bashkortostan
- District: Tatyshlinsky District
- Time zone: UTC+5:00

Mamatayevo (Russian: Маматаево; Bashkir: Мәмәтәй, Mämätäy) is a rural locality (a village) in Bul-Kaypanovsky Selsoviet, Tatyshlinsky District, Bashkortostan, Russia. The population was 313 as of 2010. There are 5 streets.

== Geography ==
Mamatayevo is located 13 km northwest of Verkhniye Tatyshly (the district's administrative centre) by road. Starochukurovo is the nearest rural locality.
