= Kytki-Yelga =

Kytki-Yelga Кытки-Елга
- Village
- Location within Bashkortostan Location within Russia
- Coordinates: 56°17′N 56°09′E
- Country: Russia
- Region: Bashkortostan
- District: Tatyshlinsky District
- Time zone: UTC+5:00

Kytki-Yelga (Russian: Кытки-Елга; Bashkir: Ҡытҡыйылға, Qıtqıyılğa) is a rural locality (a village) in Nizhnebaltachevsky Selsoviet, Tatyshlinsky District, Bashkortostan, Russia, 32 km east of Verkhniye Tatyshly (the district's administrative centre) by road. Tanypovka is the nearest rural locality. The population was 117 in 2010. There are two streets.
