= 1st Yanaul =

1st Yanaul 1-й Янаул 1-се Яңауыл 1-se Yañawıl
- Village
- Location within Bashkortostan Location within Russia
- Coordinates: 56.276111°N 55.585833°E
- Country: Russia
- Region: Bashkortostan
- District: Tatyshlinsky District
- Time zone: UTC+05:00

1st Yanaul (Russian: 1-й Янаул; Bashkir: 1-се Яңауыл, 1-se Yañawıl) is a rural locality (a village) in Kudashevsky Selsoviet of Tatyshlinsky District, Russia. The population was 98 as of 2010.

== Geography ==
1st Yanaul is located 18 km west of Verkhniye Tatyshly (the district's administrative centre) by road. Kardagushevo is the nearest rural locality.

== Streets ==
- Zarechnaya
- Faiza Galieva
- Tsentralnaya
