= Tanypovka =

Tanypovka Таныповка
- Village
- Location within Bashkortostan Location within Russia
- Coordinates: 56°16′N 56°09′E
- Country: Russia
- Region: Bashkortostan
- District: Tatyshlinsky District
- Time zone: UTC+5:00

Tanypovka (Russian: Таныповка; Bashkir: Танып, Tanıp) is a rural locality (a village) in Nizhnebaltachevsky Selsoviet, Tatyshlinsky District, Bashkortostan, Russia. The population was 101 as of 2010. There is one street.

== Geography ==
Tanypovka is located 30 km southeast of Verkhniye Tatyshly (the district's administrative centre) by road. Kytki-Yelga is the nearest rural locality.
