= Starokalmiyarovo =

Starokalmiyarovo Старокальмиярово
- Selo
- Location within Bashkortostan Location within Russia
- Coordinates: 56°10′N 56°02′E
- Country: Russia
- Region: Bashkortostan
- District: Tatyshlinsky District
- Time zone: UTC+5:00

Starokalmiyarovo (Russian: Старокальмиярово; Bashkir: Иҫке Ҡәлмиәр, İśke Qälmiär) is a rural locality (a selo) and the administrative centre of Kalmiyarovsky Selsoviet, Tatyshlinsky District, Bashkortostan, Russia. The population was 410 as of 2010. There are 9 streets.

== Geography ==
Starokalmiyarovo is located 21 km southeast of Verkhniye Tatyshly (the district's administrative centre) by road. Petropavlovka is the nearest rural locality.
