= Maysk, Republic of Bashkortostan =

Maysk Майск
- Village
- Location within Bashkortostan Location within Russia
- Coordinates: 56°11′N 55°56′E
- Country: Russia
- Region: Bashkortostan
- District: Tatyshlinsky District
- Time zone: UTC+5:00

Maysk (Russian: Майск) is a rural locality (a village) in Novotatyshlinsky Selsoviet, Tatyshlinsky District, Bashkortostan, Russia. The population was 76 as of 2010. There is 1 street.

== Geography ==
Maysk is located 15 km southeast of Verkhniye Tatyshly (the district's administrative centre) by road. Savkiyaz is the nearest rural locality.
