= Savaleyevo, Tatyshlinsky District, Republic of Bashkortostan =

Savaleyevo Савалеево
- Village
- Location within Bashkortostan Location within Russia
- Coordinates: 56°06′N 55°36′E
- Country: Russia
- Region: Bashkortostan
- District: Tatyshlinsky District
- Time zone: UTC+5:00

Savaleyevo (Russian: Савалеево; Bashkir: Һәүәләй, Häwäläy) is a rural locality (a village) in Akbulatovsky Selsoviet, Tatyshlinsky District, Bashkortostan, Russia. The population was 100 as of 2010. There are 3 streets.

== Geography ==
Savaleyevo is located 46 km southwest of Verkhniye Tatyshly (the district's administrative centre) by road. Staroakbulatovo is the nearest rural locality.
