= Stary Sikiyaz =

Stary Sikiyaz Старый Сикияз
- Village
- Location within Bashkortostan Location within Russia
- Coordinates: 56°09′N 55°49′E
- Country: Russia
- Region: Bashkortostan
- District: Tatyshlinsky District
- Time zone: UTC+5:00

Stary Sikiyaz (Russian: Старый Сикияз; Bashkir: Иҫке Һикәяҙ, İśke Hikäyaź) is a rural locality (a village) in Yalgyz-Naratsky Selsoviet, Tatyshlinsky District, Bashkortostan, Russia. The population was 226 as of 2010. There are 4 streets.

== Geography ==
Stary Sikiyaz is located 25 km southwest of Verkhniye Tatyshly (the district's administrative centre) by road. Yalgyz-Narat and Asavdy are the nearest rural localities.
