= Vyazovka, Tatyshlinsky District, Republic of Bashkortostan =

Vyazovka Вязовка
- Selo
- Location within Bashkortostan Location within Russia
- Coordinates: 56°15′N 55°59′E
- Country: Russia
- Region: Bashkortostan
- District: Tatyshlinsky District
- Time zone: UTC+5:00

Vyazovka (Russian: Вязовка) is a rural locality (a selo) in Kaltyayevsky Selsoviet, Tatyshlinsky District, Bashkortostan, Russia. The population was 504 as of 2010. There are 5 streets.

== Geography ==
Vyazovka is located 9 km southeast of Verkhniye Tatyshly (the district's administrative centre) by road. Nizhneye Kaltyayevo is the nearest rural locality.
