= Burgynbash =

Burgynbash Бургынбаш
- Village
- Location within Bashkortostan Location within Russia
- Coordinates: 56°16′N 55°25′E
- Country: Russia
- Region: Bashkortostan
- District: Tatyshlinsky District
- Time zone: UTC+5:00

Burgynbash (Russian: Бургынбаш; Bashkir: Борғонбаш, Borğonbaş) is a rural locality (a village) in Kurdymsky Selsoviet, Tatyshlinsky District, Bashkortostan, Russia. The population was 137 as of 2010. There are 3 streets.

== Geography ==
Burgynbash is located 30 km west of Verkhniye Tatyshly (the district's administrative centre) by road. 2-y Zirimzibash is the nearest rural locality.
