= Shulganovo =

Shulganovo Шулганово
- Selo
- Location within Bashkortostan Location within Russia
- Coordinates: 56°09′N 55°29′E
- Country: Russia
- Region: Bashkortostan
- District: Tatyshlinsky District
- Time zone: UTC+5:00

Shulganovo (Russian: Шулганово; Bashkir: Шулған, Şulğan) is a rural locality (selo) and the administrative centre of Shulganovsky Selsoviet in the Tatyshlinsky District, Bashkortostan, Russia. As of 2010, The population was 925. The locality comprises six streets.

== Geography ==
Shulganovo is located 36 km southwest of Verkhniye Tatyshly (the administrative centre of the district), by road. The nearest rural locality is Zilyaktau.
