= Zirimzi =

Zirimzi Зиримзи
- Village
- Location within Bashkortostan Location within Russia
- Coordinates: 56°19′N 55°35′E
- Country: Russia
- Region: Bashkortostan
- District: Tatyshlinsky District
- Time zone: UTC+5:00

Zirimzi (Russian: Зиримзи; Bashkir: Еремйә, Yeremyä) is a rural locality (a village) in Aksaitovsky Selsoviet, Tatyshlinsky District, Bashkortostan, Russia. The population was 196 as of 2010. There are 2 streets.

== Geography ==
Zirimzi is located 24 km northwest of Verkhniye Tatyshly (the district's administrative centre) by road. Novochukurovo is the nearest rural locality.
