= Onaç =

Onaç can refer to:

- Onaç, Ilgaz
- Onaç, İskilip
- Onaç, Mustafakemalpaşa
- Onaç spring minnow
- Onaç-1 Dam
- Onaç-2 Dam
