= Stary Kurdym =

Stary Kurdym Старый Курдым
- Selo
- Location within Bashkortostan Location within Russia
- Coordinates: 56°14′N 55°29′E
- Country: Russia
- Region: Bashkortostan
- District: Tatyshlinsky District
- Time zone: UTC+5:00

Stary Kurdym (Russian: Старый Курдым; Bashkir: Иҫке Күрҙем, İśke Kürźem) is a rural locality (a selo) and the administrative centre of Kurdymsky Selsoviet, Tatyshlinsky District, Bashkortostan, Russia. The population was 1,095 as of 2010. There are 13 streets.

== Geography ==
Stary Kurdym is located 27 km west of Verkhniye Tatyshly (the district's administrative centre) by road. Yurmiyazbash is the nearest rural locality.
