= Kurusaray =

Kurusaray can refer to:

- Kurusaray, İskilip
- Kurusaray, Kastamonu
