= Halli =

Halli may refer to:

- Halli Airport, a military airport located in Kuorevesi, Jämsä, Finland
- Halli or Challi, an island in the Gulf of Finland
- Halli (taajama), a village in Finland
- Halli (899), a Finnish oil spill response vessel
- Helsinki Halli, an arena in Finland
- Haraldur Ingi Þorleifsson "Halli", an Icelandic entrepreneur, businessman and philanthropist

== See also ==
- Hallı (disambiguation)
- Hallie (disambiguation)
- Hally
