= Balcılar, Bismil =

Village in Diyarbakır Province, Turkey

Balcılar
- Neighbourhood
- Location in Turkey
- Coordinates: 37.731°N 40.862°E
- Country: Turkey
- Province: Diyarbakır
- District: Bismil
- Population (2022): 254
- Time zone: UTC+3 (TRT)

Balcılar (Kurdish: Seledun; Syriac: Sīldūn) (Note: Alternatively transliterated as Saladun, Salladon, or Sildoun.) is a neighbourhood in the municipality and district of Bismil, Diyarbakır Province in Turkey. It is populated by Kurds of the Barava tribe and had a population of 254 in 2022.

== History ==
Sīldūn (today called Balcılar) was historically inhabited by Syriac Orthodox Christians. In the Syriac Orthodox patriarchal register of dues of 1870, it was recorded that the village had 4 households, who paid 15 dues, and did not have a church or a priest. It was located in the district of al-Bahramakiyyah in 1870.

It was located in the kaza (district) of Silvan in the Diyarbekir sanjak in the Diyarbekir vilayet in c. 1900. There were 50 Syriacs in 1914, according to the list presented to the Paris Peace Conference by the Assyro-Chaldean delegation. By 1914, it was situated in the Bafaya nahiyah (commune) of the kaza of Beşiri. No survivors of the Sayfo are attested from this area.

== See also ==
- Alplar, Bismil

== Bibliography ==
- Bcheiry, Iskandar (2009). The Syriac Orthodox Patriarchal Register of Dues of 1870: An Unpublished Historical Document from the Late Ottoman Period. Gorgias Press.
- Gaunt, David (2006). Massacres, Resistance, Protectors: Muslim-Christian Relations in Eastern Anatolia during World War I. Gorgias Press.
- Jongerden, Joost; Verheij, Jelle, eds. (2012). Social Relations in Ottoman Diyarbekir, 1870-1915. Brill.
- Tan, Altan (2018). Turabidin'den Berriye'ye. Aşiretler - Dinler - Diller - Kültürler (in Turkish). ISBN 9789944360944.
