= Karmış =

Karmış can refer to:

- Karmış, İskilip
- Karmış, Karaçoban
