= Aluç =

Aluç can refer to:

- Aluç, Bismil
- Aluç, İskilip
