= Tashkent, Tatyshlinsky District, Republic of Bashkortostan =

Tashkent Ташкент
- Village
- Location within Bashkortostan Location within Russia
- Coordinates: 56°18′N 55°24′E
- Country: Russia
- Region: Bashkortostan
- District: Tatyshlinsky District
- Time zone: UTC+5:00

Tashkent (Russian: Ташкент; Bashkir: Ташкент, Taşkent) is a rural locality (a village) in Kurdymsky Selsoviet, Tatyshlinsky District, Bashkortostan, Russia. The population was 96 as of 2010. There are 2 streets.

== Geography ==
Tashkent is located 35 km west of Verkhniye Tatyshly (the district's administrative centre) by road. Achu-Yelga is the nearest rural locality.
