= Hacıhalil =

Hacıhalil is a Turkish name that may refer to the following places in Turkey:

- Hacıhalil, Adıyaman, a village in the district of Adıyaman, Adıyaman Province
- Hacıhalil, Besni, a village in the district of Besni, Adıyaman Province
- Hacıhalil, Horasan
- Hacıhalil, İskilip
- Hacıhalilarpaç, a village in the district of Erdemli, Mersin Province
