= Yavu =

Yavu can refer to:

- Yavu, Demre
- Yavu, İskilip
