= Ahmetçe =

Ahmetçe can refer to:

- Ahmetçe, Ayvacık
- Ahmetçe, İskilip
