= Çavuşoğlu =

Çavuşoğlu can refer to:

== Surname ==
- Mevlüt Çavuşoğlu

== Places ==
- Çavuşoğlu, Aziziye
- Çavuşoğlu, İskilip
