= 2nd Zirimzibash =

2nd Zirimzibash 2-й Зиримзибаш 2-се Еремйәбаш 2-se Yeremyäbaş
- Village
- Location within Bashkortostan Location within Russia
- Coordinates: 56.263333°N 55.456667°E
- Country: Russia
- Region: Bashkortostan
- District: Tatyshlinsky District
- Time zone: UTC+05:00

2nd Zirimzibash (Russian: 2-й Зиримзибаш; Bashkir: 2-се Еремйәбаш, 2-se Yeremyäbaş) is a rural locality (a village) in Kurdymsky Selsoviet of Tatyshlinsky District, Russia. The population was 151 as of 2010.

== Geography ==
2nd Zirimzibash is located 28 km west of Verkhniye Tatyshly (the district's administrative centre) by road. Stary Kurdym is the nearest rural locality.

== Ethnicity ==
The village is inhabited by Bashkirs.

== Streets ==
- Molodezhnaya
- Tsentralnaya
