= Başmakçı (disambiguation) =

Başmakçı is a town and district of Afyonkarahisar Province, Turkey.

Başmakçı may also refer to:

- Başmakçı, Burdur
- Başmakçı, Çorum, Turkey
- Başmakçı, Niğde, Turkey
