= Musular =

Musular can refer to:

- Musular, İskilip
- Musular, Şereflikoçhisar
