= Kustarevka, Republic of Bashkortostan =

Kustarevka Кустаревка
- Village
- Location within Bashkortostan Location within Russia
- Coordinates: 56°12′N 55°30′E
- Country: Russia
- Region: Bashkortostan
- District: Tatyshlinsky District
- Time zone: UTC+5:00

Kustarevka (Russian: Кустаревка) is a rural locality (a village) in Shulganovsky Selsoviet, Tatyshlinsky District, Bashkortostan, Russia. The population was 1 as of 2010. There is 1 street.

== Geography ==
Kustarevka is located 35 km southwest of Verkhniye Tatyshly (the district's administrative centre) by road. Zilyaktau is the nearest rural locality.
