= Yerli =

Yerli (from Turkish: yerlü, meaning "local") may refer to:

- Yerliyya, Janissary auxiliaries
- Yerli, İskilip, Turkey
- Cevat Yerli (born 1978), Turkish computer game developer
