= Karlık =

Karlık can refer to the following villages in Turkey:

- Karlık, Balya
- Karlık, İskilip
- Karlık, Şuhut
- Karlık, Taşova
- Karlık, Yüreğir
