= COMU =

COMU can refer to:

- Çomu, İskilip
- Çanakkale Onsekiz Mart University
- COMU, (1-Cyano-2-ethoxy-2-oxoethylidenaminooxy)dimethylamino-morpholino-carbenium hexafluorophosphate. Amide coupling reagent. COMU is a registered trademark of Luxembourg Bio Technologies, marketed as a safer and more effective replacement for benzotriazole-based uronium coupling reagents; see Peptide synthesis#Triazoles.
