= Yalak =

Yalak may refer to:

- Yalak, Republic of Dagestan, Russia
- Yalak, Ceyhan, Turkey
- Yalak, İskilip, Turkey
