= Soğucak (disambiguation) =

Soğucak can refer to:

- Soğucak
- Soğucak, Alaca
- Soğucak, İskilip
- Soğucak, Savaştepe
- Soğucak, Yenice
