= Kuzuluk =

Kuzuluk may refer to several places in Turkey:

- Kuzuluk, Aziziye
- Kuzuluk, İskilip
- Kuzuluk, Refahiye
