= Karaçukur =

Karaçukur may refer to:

- Karaçukur, Anamur, village in Mersin Province, Turkey
- Karaçukur, Gazipaşa, village in Antalya Province, Turkey
- Karaçukur, İskilip
