= Kuzköy =

Kuzköy can refer to:

- Kuzköy, Dursunbey
- Kuzköy, İskilip
