= Hallı =

Hallı may refer to:

- Hallı, Alaplı, Turkey
- Hallı, İskilip, Turkey

== See also ==
- Hallie (disambiguation)
- Halli (disambiguation)
