= Aşağışeyhler, İskilip =

Village in Turkey

Aşağışeyhler
- Village
- Location in Turkey
- Coordinates: 40.8963°N 34.4420°E
- Country: Turkey
- Province: Çorum
- District: İskilip
- Population (2022): 368
- Time zone: UTC+3 (TRT)

Aşağışeyhler is a village in the İskilip District of Çorum Province in Turkey. Its population is 368 (2022).
