= Şeyhköy, İskilip =

Village in Turkey

Şeyhköy
- Village
- Location in Turkey
- Coordinates: 40.8016°N 34.6063°E
- Country: Turkey
- Province: Çorum
- District: İskilip
- Population (2022): 375
- Time zone: UTC+3 (TRT)

Şeyhköy is a village in the İskilip District of Çorum Province in Turkey. Its population is 375 (2022).
