= Akpınar, İskilip =

Village in Turkey

Akpınar
- Village
- Location in Turkey
- Coordinates: 40.7539°N 34.3293°E
- Country: Turkey
- Province: Çorum
- District: İskilip
- Population (2022): 109
- Time zone: UTC+3 (TRT)

Akpınar is a village in the İskilip District of Çorum Province in Turkey. Its population is 109 (2022).
