= İkikise, İskilip =

Village in Turkey

İkikise
- Village
- Location in Turkey
- Coordinates: 40°55′N 34°20′E
- Country: Turkey
- Province: Çorum
- District: İskilip
- Population (2022): 148
- Time zone: UTC+3 (TRT)

İkikise (also: İkikese) is a village in the İskilip District of Çorum Province in Turkey. Its population is 148 (2022).
