= Beyoğlan, İskilip =

Village in Turkey

Beyoğlan
- Village
- Location in Turkey
- Coordinates: 40°51′N 34°33′E
- Country: Turkey
- Province: Çorum
- District: İskilip
- Population (2022): 361
- Time zone: UTC+3 (TRT)

Beyoğlan is a village in the İskilip District of Çorum Province in Turkey. Its population is 361 (2022).
