= İskilip District =

District of Çorum Province, Turkey

- District
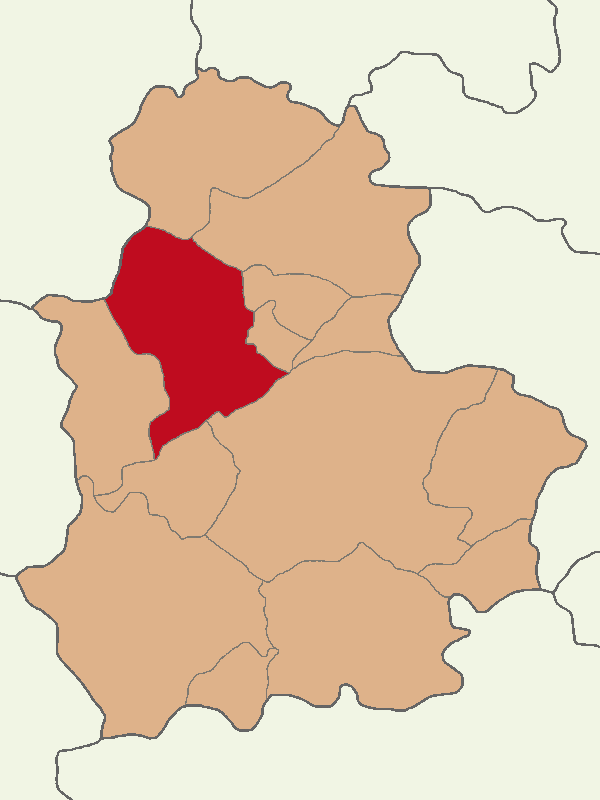
- Map showing İskilip District in Çorum Province

- Location in Turkey
- Coordinates: 40°44′N 34°28′E
- Country: Turkey
- Province: Çorum
- Seat: İskilip

Government
  - Kaymakam: Yunus Emre Vural
- Area: 1,170 km^{2} (450 sq mi)
- Population (2022): 29,643
  - Density: 25/km^{2} (66/sq mi)
- Time zone: UTC+3 (TRT)
- Website: www.iskilip.gov.tr

İskilip District is a district of the Çorum Province of Turkey. Its seat is the town of İskilip. Its area is 1,170 km^{2}, and its population is 29,643 (2022).

== Composition ==
There is one municipality in İskilip District:

- İskilip

There are 64 villages in İskilip District:

- Ahlatcık
- Ahmetçe
- Akcasu
- Akpınar
- Aluç
- Aşağıörenseki
- Aşağışeyhler
- Asarcık
- Avhatyakası
- Başmakçı
- Beyoğlan
- Çatkara
- Çavuşoğlu
- Çetmi
- Çomu
- Çukurköy
- Dağkıyısı
- Derekargın
- Dereseki
- Doğangir
- Elmalı
- Eskiköy
- Gölköy
- Güneyaluç
- Hacıhalil
- Hallı
- Harun
- İbik
- İkikise
- İkipınar
- Karaağaç
- Karaburun
- Karaçukur
- Karagöz
- Karlık
- Karmış
- Kavak
- Kayaağzı
- Kılıçdere
- Kızılcabayır
- Kurusaray
- Kutluözü
- Kuzköy
- Kuzuluk
- Musular
- Onaç
- Örübağ
- Saraycık
- Sarıkavak
- Şehirkuruçay
- Seki
- Şeyhköy
- Seyirçay
- Soğucak
- Sorkun
- Suhilan
- Yalak
- Yalakçay
- Yanoğlan
- Yavu
- Yaylacıkseki
- Yenice
- Yerli
- Yukarıörenseki
