= Aşağıörenseki, İskilip =

Village in Turkey

Aşağıörenseki
- Village
- Location in Turkey
- Coordinates: 40.6816°N 34.3824°E
- Country: Turkey
- Province: Çorum
- District: İskilip
- Population (2022): 507
- Time zone: UTC+3 (TRT)

Aşağıörenseki is a village in the İskilip District of Çorum Province in Turkey. Its population is 507 (2022).
