= Kavak, İskilip =

Village in Turkey

Kavak
- Village
- Country: Turkey
- Province: Çorum
- District: İskilip
- Population (2022): 68
- Time zone: UTC+3 (TRT)

Kavak (also: Kavakköy) is a village in the İskilip District of Çorum Province in Turkey. Its population is 68 (2022).
