= Suhilan, İskilip =

Village in Turkey

Suhilan
- Village
- Location in Turkey
- Coordinates: 40°33′N 34°22′E
- Country: Turkey
- Province: Çorum
- District: İskilip
- Population (2022): 88
- Time zone: UTC+3 (TRT)

Suhilan is a village in the İskilip District of Çorum Province in Turkey. Its population is 88 (2022). The village is populated by Kurds.
