= Asarcık, İskilip =

Village in Turkey

Asarcık
- Village
- Location in Turkey
- Coordinates: 40.7762°N 34.5877°E
- Country: Turkey
- Province: Çorum
- District: İskilip
- Population (2022): 390
- Time zone: UTC+3 (TRT)

Asarcık is a village in the İskilip District of Çorum Province in Turkey. Its population was 390 in 2022.
