= Seki, İskilip =

Village in Turkey

Seki
- Village
- Location in Turkey
- Coordinates: 40.7966°N 34.4247°E
- Country: Turkey
- Province: Çorum
- District: İskilip
- Population (2022): 152
- Time zone: UTC+3 (TRT)

Seki is a village in the İskilip District of Çorum Province in Turkey. Its population is 152 (2022).
