= Yanoğlan, İskilip =

Village in Turkey

Yanoğlan
- Village
- Location in Turkey
- Coordinates: 40°49′09″N 34°23′55″E
- Country: Turkey
- Province: Çorum
- District: İskilip
- Population (2022): 166
- Time zone: UTC+3 (TRT)

Yanoğlan is a village in the İskilip District of Çorum Province in Turkey. Its population is 166 (2022).
