= Yalakçay, İskilip =

Village in Turkey

Yalakçay
- Village
- Location in Turkey
- Coordinates: 40°38′N 34°35′E
- Country: Turkey
- Province: Çorum
- District: İskilip
- Population (2022): 117
- Time zone: UTC+3 (TRT)

Yalakçay is a village in the İskilip District of Çorum Province in Turkey. Its population is 117 (2022).
