= Çukurköy, İskilip =

Village in Turkey

Çukurköy
- Village
- Location in Turkey
- Coordinates: 40.5877°N 34.4447°E
- Country: Turkey
- Province: Çorum
- District: İskilip
- Population (2022): 477
- Time zone: UTC+3 (TRT)

Çukurköy is a village in the İskilip District of Çorum Province in Turkey. Its population is 477 (2022).
