= Doğangir, İskilip =

Village in Turkey

Doğangir
- Village
- Location in Turkey
- Coordinates: 40°46′N 34°26′E
- Country: Turkey
- Province: Çorum
- District: İskilip
- Population (2022): 49
- Time zone: UTC+3 (TRT)

Doğangir is a village in the İskilip District of Çorum Province in Turkey. Its population is 49 (2022).
