= Yukarıörenseki, İskilip =

Village in Turkey

Yukarıörenseki
- Village
- Location in Turkey
- Coordinates: 40°42′N 34°23′E
- Country: Turkey
- Province: Çorum
- District: İskilip
- Population (2022): 503
- Time zone: UTC+3 (TRT)

Yukarıörenseki is a village in the İskilip District of Çorum Province in Turkey. Its population is 503 (2022).
