= Avhatyakası, İskilip =

Village in Turkey

Avhatyakası
- Village
- Location in Turkey
- Coordinates: 40°54′N 34°25′E
- Country: Turkey
- Province: Çorum
- District: İskilip
- Population (2022): 282
- Time zone: UTC+3 (TRT)

Avhatyakası is a village in the İskilip District of Çorum Province in Turkey. Its population is 282 (2022).
