= Kılıçdere, İskilip =

Village in Turkey

Kılıçdere
- Village
- Location in Turkey
- Coordinates: 40°41′N 34°33′E
- Country: Turkey
- Province: Çorum
- District: İskilip
- Population (2022): 325
- Time zone: UTC+3 (TRT)

Kılıçdere is a village in the İskilip District of Çorum Province in Turkey. Its population is 325 (2022). The village is populated by Kurds and is the village of Naci Bostancı.
