= Kızılcabayır, İskilip =

Village in Turkey

Kızılcabayır
- Village
- Location in Turkey
- Coordinates: 40°52′N 34°24′E
- Country: Turkey
- Province: Çorum
- District: İskilip
- Population (2022): 98
- Time zone: UTC+3 (TRT)

Kızılcabayır is a village in the İskilip District of Çorum Province in Turkey. Its population is 98 (2022).
