= İskilip =

İskilip Esculape
- Municipality
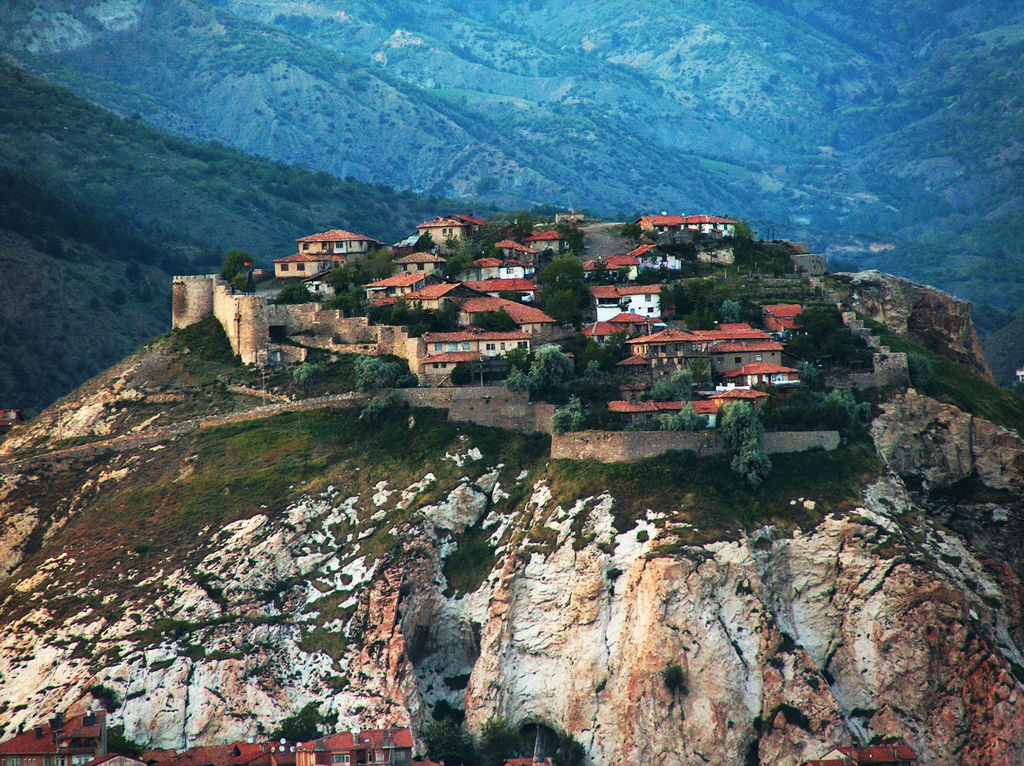
- Old picture of the citadel of İskilip

- Coat of arms

- Location within Turkey
- Coordinates: 40°44′10″N 34°28′26″E
- Country: Turkey
- Province: Çorum
- District: İskilip

Government
  - Mayor: Ali Sülük (MHP)
- Elevation: 750 m (2,460 ft)
- Population (2022): 17,612
- Time zone: UTC+3 (TRT)
- Postal code: 19400
- Area code: 0364
- Climate: Csb
- Website: www.iskilip.bel.tr

İskilip is a district of Çorum Province, Turkey, on the left bank of the River Kızılırmak, located at 56 km from the city of Çorum, 100 miles (160 km) northeast of Ankara and 60 miles (100 km) southeast of Kastamonu. It is the seat of İskilip District. Its population is 17,612 (2022). The mayor is Ali Sülük.

== Etymology ==
Former names included Iskila (the name given to the area in Hittite times), Asklepios / Aesculapius (in ancient Greek), Blocium / Bloacium, İmad, Iskelib / İskelib (the ancient name returning into use in the Seljuk Turkish era), and Direklibel.

== Geography ==
İskilip lies on a well-watered plain, several miles off the road between Çankırı and Amasya among wooded hills, at the foot of a limestone rock crowned by the ruins of an ancient fortress now filled with houses. Near the town are saline springs, from which salt has been extracted. The climate is dry. The highest point is Mount Teke (1700m). The local economy depends on agriculture, especially grains and pulses, and forestry. Iskilip lies on the North Anatolian Fault.

== History ==
People have been attracted to the saline springs of İskilip since the earliest times, and the town stands on a route through the mountains to the Black Sea coast. Therefore, this is one of the longest-settled areas of Anatolia; copper was smelted here in ancient times, when the plain was settled by the Hittite and Hatti civilizations (from 3000 BC). Rock carvings on the hill of Yivlik are said to date to the Hittite period. The area which consists of İskilip and Tosya district of Kastamonu Province was known as Tarittara or Turmitta during the Hittite era.

The Hattic city was then possessed by Paphlagonian kings (from 900-700 BC), was mentioned in the Iliad, and was visited by Herodotus. Then came the Galatians and the kings of Pontus, but these were soon displaced by a much stronger civilization. For the ancient Romans, who paid their soldiers in salt, the area had great importance. The Romans and, subsequently, the Byzantines settled here for a thousand years, making İskilip one of their key strongholds on the Kızılırmak. Byzantine rule of Anatolia ended in 1071 following the Byzantines' defeat by the Seljuk Turks at the Battle of Manzikert, and İskilip was soon settled (1074) by the Danishmend Turkomans, who brought Islam to the region. Centuries of fighting ensued between further Turkoman clans and, from the 13th century, waves of Mongol and Tatar invaders.

In 1390, the Ottoman Sultan Bayezid I moved against the Turkoman lords who, by now, were in control of this corner of Anatolia. After severe fighting in which an Ottoman prince was killed and the castles of Ankara, Kalecik, and others were besieged, Bayezid (the Thunderbolt) prevailed and the area was brought under Ottoman control. But the castle of İskilip had been seriously damaged, and most of the population dispersed during the fighting, never to return, perhaps wisely, as the area, in 1402, was the scene of even more terrible warfare between Bayezid's Ottomans and the Tatars of Timur following the Battle of Ankara. Following the Ottoman Interregnum, rule was restored by Bayezid's son Mehmed I, but İskilip's misfortune persisted, with destruction returning in 1509 in a large earthquake known as the little Armageddon.

At some stage, the area must have recovered, as, by the 17th century, Evliya Çelebi recorded a fortified town of 150 households, and, in 1849, French traveler Vital Cuinet recorded a city of 2,000 homes with a predominantly Muslim population of 10,563. There were 108 mosques, six dervish lodges, six kur'an schools, a civic building, five libraries, a market of 510 shops, two caravanserais, four hamams ("Turkish baths"), 18 fountains, a water garden, 18 tanneries, 63 flour mills, six bakeries, 10 coffee houses, a courthouse, a tax office, a post office, a telegraph office, and a census bureau. Gardens were used to grow buckthorn for making natural dye.

Thus, it is evident that the town has had a predominantly Turkish population since the 13th century, and the people of İskilip are said to speak Turkish with an accent that is the closest in modern Turkey to the language spoken by those first immigrants from the Central Asian heartland. In the early days of the Turkish Republic, linguists from the Turkish Language Institute conducted research in İskilip as part of the institute's program to bring authentic Turkish vocabulary into the language.

From 1867 until 1922, İskilip was part of Angora vilayet. Unable to sustain the manufacturing or large-scaled trade that fuels a modern city, from the late 19th century, İskilip has declined and is now eclipsed by nearby Çorum, much to the resentment of the people of İskilip, who will buy cars with Ankara license plates rather than Çorum and will go to great lengths to avoid visiting the provincial capital. In 1930, the first bridge over the Kızılırmak was built, with wood, to connect İskilip with Çorum. The first school in İskilip was opened in 1935, and the first high school in 1968.

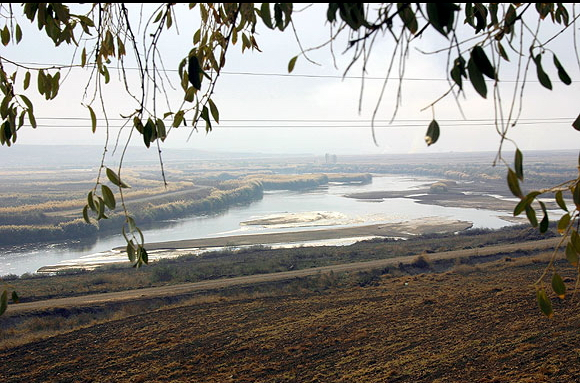
Taybı Plain in İskilip.

== İskilip today ==
Modern İskilip is a small town that provides the area with schools and other amenities. The cuisine is typical of much of Anatolia, including a particularly renowned rice-based dolma, wheat soup keshkek, fruit syrup (pekmez), a dry egg-noodle erişte, spice-cured beef pastırma, roasted chick peas leblebi, a round loaf called Okkalık, and, of course, a local kebab, which is a meat-and-vegetable casserole.

== Notable people ==
- Ahmet Peker (born 1989), Freestyle wrestler
- Ebussuud Efendi, Ottoman Shaykh al-Islām
- İskilipli Âtıf Hodja - (d. 1926) Islamic scholar executed in the early days of the Turkish Republic for his longstanding opposition.
- İsmail Beşikçi (b. 1939) Sociologist, historian and writer, from a conservative family in İskilip has written on issues including Kurdish nationalism, the founding of the republic and the period of a one-party state.
