= Ahlatcık, İskilip =

Village in Turkey

Ahlatcık
- Village
- Location in Turkey
- Coordinates: 40.7642°N 34.3177°E
- Country: Turkey
- Province: Çorum
- District: İskilip
- Population (2022): 34
- Time zone: UTC+3 (TRT)

Ahlatcık is a village in the İskilip District of Çorum Province in Turkey. Its population is 34 (2022).
