= Örübağ, İskilip =

Village in Turkey

Örübağ
- Village
- Location in Turkey
- Coordinates: 40°42′57″N 34°33′13″E
- Country: Turkey
- Province: Çorum
- District: İskilip
- Population (2022): 193
- Time zone: UTC+3 (TRT)

Örübağ is a village in the İskilip District of Çorum Province in Turkey. Its population is 193 (2022).
