= Şehirkuruçay, İskilip =

Village in Turkey

Şehirkuruçay
- Village
- Location in Turkey
- Coordinates: 40°43′N 34°27′E
- Country: Turkey
- Province: Çorum
- District: İskilip
- Population (2022): 160
- Time zone: UTC+3 (TRT)

Şehirkuruçay is a village in the İskilip District of Çorum Province in Turkey. Its population is 160 (2022).
