= Hally =

Hally is both a surname and a given name. Notable people with the name include:

== Surname ==
- David Hally (born 1940), American archaeologist
- Janice Hally (born 1959), Scottish playwright and screenwriter
- Patrick Hally (1866–1938), New Zealand politician
- Philip Hally, Royal Navy officer

== Given name ==
- Hally Fitch (born 1900), American archaeologist
- Hally Pancer (born 1961), American photographer
- Hally Jolivette Sax (1884-1979), American botanist
- Hally Wood (1922–1989), American musician and singer
