= Alplar, Bismil =

Village in Turkey

Alplar
- Settlement
- Location in Turkey
- Coordinates: 37.75983°N 40.83823°E
- Country: Turkey
- Province: Diyarbakır
- District: Bismil
- Time zone: UTC+3 (TRT)

Alplar (Syriac: Ḫarabah Ḥannā) (Note: Also known as Hirbahanna, Hirbehanna, Hırbehanne, Hırbehanna, and Harbé-Hanna.) is a hamlet in the district of Bismil, Diyarbakır Province in Turkey.

== History ==
Ḫarabah Ḥannā (today called Alplar) was historically inhabited by Syriac Orthodox Christians. In the Syriac Orthodox patriarchal register of dues of 1870, it was recorded that the village had 4 households, who paid 39 dues, and did not have a church or a priest. It was located in the district of al-Bahramakiyyah in 1870.

It was located in the kaza (district) of Silvan in the Diyarbekir sanjak in the Diyarbekir vilayet in c. 1900. It was populated by 100 Syriacs in 1914, according to the list presented to the Paris Peace Conference by the Assyro-Chaldean delegation. By 1914, it was situated in the Bafaya nahiyah (commune) of the kaza of Beşiri. No survivors of the Sayfo are attested from this area.

== Bibliography ==
- Bcheiry, Iskandar (2009). The Syriac Orthodox Patriarchal Register of Dues of 1870: An Unpublished Historical Document from the Late Ottoman Period. Gorgias Press.
- Gaunt, David (2006). Massacres, Resistance, Protectors: Muslim-Christian Relations in Eastern Anatolia during World War I. Gorgias Press.
- Jongerden, Joost; Verheij, Jelle, eds. (2012). Social Relations in Ottoman Diyarbekir, 1870-1915. Brill.
