= Derekargın, İskilip =

Village in Turkey

Derekargın
- Village
- Location in Turkey
- Coordinates: 40°45′50″N 34°28′38″E
- Country: Turkey
- Province: Çorum
- District: İskilip
- Population (2022): 85
- Time zone: UTC+3 (TRT)

Derekargın is a village in the İskilip District of Çorum Province in Turkey. Its population is 85 (2022).
