= Yaylacıkseki, İskilip =

Village in Turkey

Yaylacıkseki
- Village
- Location in Turkey
- Coordinates: 40°55′N 34°17′E
- Country: Turkey
- Province: Çorum
- District: İskilip
- Population (2022): 49
- Time zone: UTC+3 (TRT)

Yaylacıkseki is a village in the İskilip District of Çorum Province in Turkey. Its population is 49 (2022).
