= Dağkıyısı, İskilip =

Village in Turkey

Dağkıyısı
- Village
- Location in Turkey
- Coordinates: 40°56′N 34°16′E
- Country: Turkey
- Province: Çorum
- District: İskilip
- Population (2022): 39
- Time zone: UTC+3 (TRT)

Dağkıyısı is a village in the İskilip District of Çorum Province in Turkey. Its population is 39 (2022).
