= Balcı =

Balcı (pronounced [ˈbaɫdʒɯ]) is a Turkish name meaning "apiarist" or "beekeeper" and may refer to:

== People ==
- Serkan Balcı (born 1983), Turkish footballer
- Serhat Balcı (born 1982), Turkish wrestler
- Şükrü Balcı (1929–1993), Turkish police chief and civil servant
- Tamer Balci (1917–1993), Turkish actor

== Places ==
- Balcı, Bor, a village in the district of Bor, Niğde Province, Turkey
- Balcı, Borçka, a village in the district of Borçka, Artvin Province
- Balcı, Gönen, a village
- Balcı, Ilgaz
- Balcı, Ortaköy, small town in Aksaray Province, Turkey

== See also ==
- Balcılar (disambiguation), the plural form
