= İbik, İskilip =

Village in Turkey

İbik
- Village
- Location in Turkey
- Coordinates: 40°42′N 34°40′E
- Country: Turkey
- Province: Çorum
- District: İskilip
- Population (2022): 303
- Time zone: UTC+3 (TRT)

İbik is a village in the İskilip District of Çorum Province in Turkey. Its population is 303 (2022).
