= Akcasu, İskilip =

Village in Turkey

Akcasu
- Village
- Location in Turkey
- Coordinates: 40.8216°N 34.4287°E
- Country: Turkey
- Province: Çorum
- District: İskilip
- Population (2022): 289
- Time zone: UTC+3 (TRT)

Akcasu (also: Akçasu) is a village in the İskilip District of Çorum Province in Turkey. Its population is 289 (2022).
