= Çetmi =

- Neighbourhood
- Location in Turkey Çetmi (Turkey Central Anatolia)
- Coordinates: 36°53′N 32°37′E
- Country: Turkey
- Province: Konya
- District: Taşkent
- Elevation: 1,320 m (4,330 ft)
- Population (2022): 915
- Time zone: UTC+3 (TRT)
- Area code: 0332

Çetmi is a neighbourhood of the municipality and district of Taşkent, Konya Province, Turkey. Its population is 915 (2022). Before the 2013 reorganisation, it was a town (belde). It is subdivided into two mahalle: Cömeşpınar and Yeni.

According to mayor's page the original name was Çepni (referring to a branch of Oghuz Turks); but eventually the word Çepni was corrupted to Çetmi. It is a secluded town situated in Toros Mountains. The distance to Taşkent is 20 kilometres (12 mi) and to Konya is 155 kilometres (96 mi).The sole road to the town passes through a narrow pass.
