= Hallie, Kentucky =

Unincorporated community in Kentucky, United States

- Unincorporated community
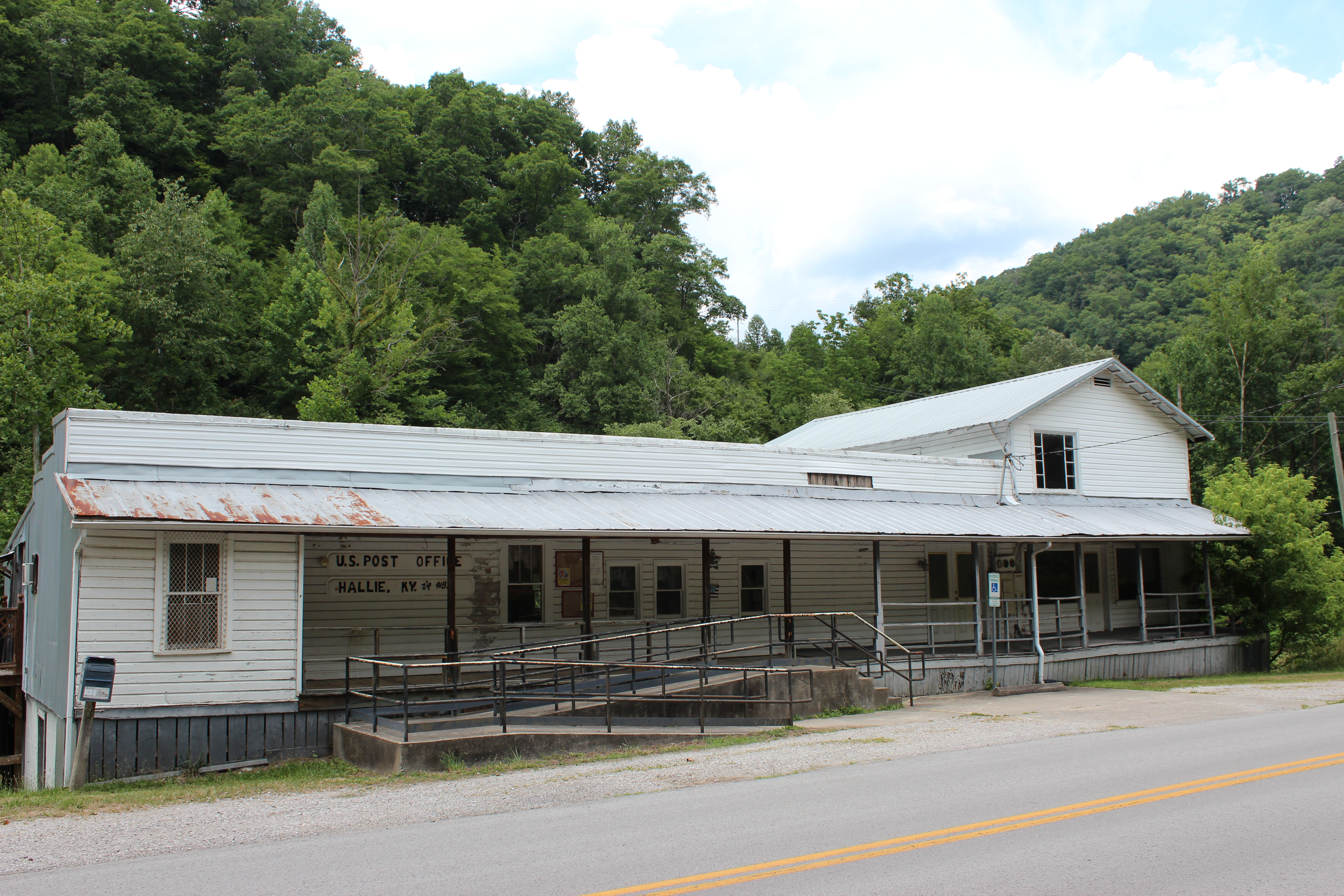
- Hallie Post Office

- Location in Kentucky Location in the United States
- Coordinates: 37°6′8″N 83°1′17″W
- Country: United States
- State: Kentucky
- County: Letcher
- Elevation: 1,030 ft (310 m)
- Time zone: UTC-5 (Eastern (EST))
  - Summer (DST): UTC-4 (EDT)
- ZIP codes: 41821
- GNIS feature ID: 512527

Hallie is an unincorporated community located in Letcher County, Kentucky, United States. The Hallie post office was established on June 16, 1916, with Alamander Whitaker as its first postmaster. The post office still operates with the ZIP code 41821.
