= Balcılar, Taşkent =

Settlement in Turkey

Balcılar
- Neighbourhood
- Location in Turkey Balcılar (Turkey Central Anatolia)
- Coordinates: 36°54′N 32°41′E
- Country: Turkey
- Province: Konya
- District: Taşkent
- Elevation: 1,400 m (4,600 ft)
- Population (2022): 1,592
- Time zone: UTC+3 (TRT)
- Postal code: 42960
- Area code: 0332

Balcılar is a neighbourhood of the municipality and district of Taşkent, Konya Province, Turkey. Its population is 1,592 (2022). Before the 2013 reorganisation, it was a town (belde). It is subdivided into three mahalle: Orta, Veliler and Yukarı.

== Geography ==
Balcılar is on the northern slopes of Toros Mountains at 1,400 m (4,600 ft). The town is far from the main highways; the distance to Taşkent is 27 km (17 mi) and to Konya is 173 km (107 mi).

== History ==
The earliest settlers in the 16th century were Turkmens from the village of Alata (modern Erdemli district of Mersin Province) who named the village after their former home, Alata. In 1964, Alata was declared a township and renamed Balcılar, meaning beekeepers. Balcılar made news in 2008 when bottled gas in a girls’ dormitory building exploded, killing 16 students and two teachers.

== Economy ==
The main economic activities are beekeeping and agriculture. Apple is the most pronounced crop, followed by cherry and walnut.
