= Ahmetçe, İskilip =

Village in Turkey

Ahmetçe
- Village
- Location in Turkey
- Coordinates: 40.7425°N 34.3826°E
- Country: Turkey
- Province: Çorum
- District: İskilip
- Population (2022): 66
- Time zone: UTC+3 (TRT)

Ahmetçe is a village in the İskilip District of Çorum Province in Turkey. Agriculture is the main economic activity in the village, with crops such as wheat, barley, and sugar beets being grown. As well as, sheep and cattle being raised. Its population is around 66 (2022).
