= Tashkent (store) =

Uzbek grocery store chain in New York City

Tashkent, West Village location.

Tashkent is a chain of Uzbek grocery stores in New York City. There are five locations in the Brooklyn, Queens, and Manhattan boroughs.

Tashkent was founded in 2012 by Odiljon Tursunov, an Uzbek immigrant who moved to New York in the early 2000s. The store is named after Tashkent, the capital of Uzbekistan. The chain's original location is in Sheepshead Bay; other locations cater to the large Central Asian populations of neighborhoods such as Forest Hills. A Tashkent opened in Manhattan's West Village in March 2025.

A review in The New York Times described the store as "venerated," noting that "the big draw is the prepared food." The store also sells products and dishes from other Central and Western Asian countries. Tashkent owns a slaughterhouse and sausage factory in New Jersey.

New York Mayor Zohran Mamdani has publicly praised Tashkent's manti. The store's popularity has been considered important for the spread of awareness of Uzbek culture in New York.
