= Karmış, İskilip =

Village in Turkey

Karmış
- Village
- Location in Turkey
- Coordinates: 40.8313°N 34.3027°E
- Country: Turkey
- Province: Çorum
- District: İskilip
- Population (2022): 121
- Time zone: UTC+3 (TRT)

Karmış is a village in the İskilip District of Çorum Province in Turkey. Its population is 121 (2022).
