= Karaburun Peninsula =

Karaburun Peninsula may refer to:

- Karaburun Peninsula, Albania, a peninsula in Albania
- Karaburun Peninsula, Turkey, a peninsula in Turkey
