= Aluç, İskilip =

Village in Turkey

Aluç
- Village
- Location in Turkey
- Coordinates: 40.7876°N 34.3363°E
- Country: Turkey
- Province: Çorum
- District: İskilip
- Population (2022): 78
- Time zone: UTC+3 (TRT)

Aluç is a village in the İskilip District of Çorum Province in Turkey. Its population is 78 (2022).
