= Başmakçı, İskilip =

Başmakçı
- Village
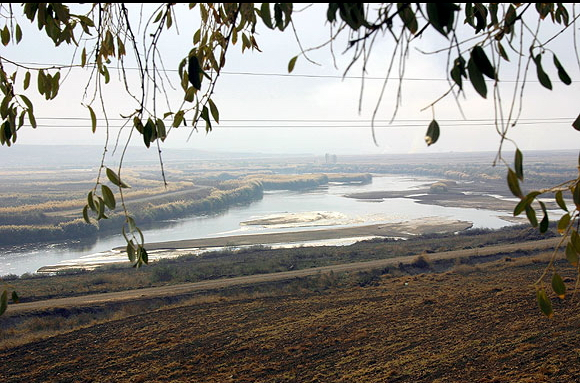
- Taybı Plain near Başmakçı

- Location within Turkey
- Coordinates: 40°43′N 34°37′E
- Country: Turkey
- Province: Çorum
- District: İskilip
- Population (2022): 134
- Time zone: UTC+3 (TRT)
- Climate: Csb

Başmakçı is a village in the İskilip District of Çorum Province, Turkey. Its population is 134 (2022).
