= Çavuşoğlu, İskilip =

Village in Turkey

Çavuşoğlu
- Village
- Location in Turkey
- Coordinates: 40.7433°N 34.5163°E
- Country: Turkey
- Province: Çorum
- District: İskilip
- Population (2022): 131
- Time zone: UTC+3 (TRT)

Çavuşoğlu is a village in the İskilip District of Çorum Province in Turkey. Its population is 131 (2022).
