= Kuzköy, İskilip =

Village in Turkey

Kuzköy
- Village
- Country: Turkey
- Province: Çorum
- District: İskilip
- Population (2022): 253
- Time zone: UTC+3 (TRT)

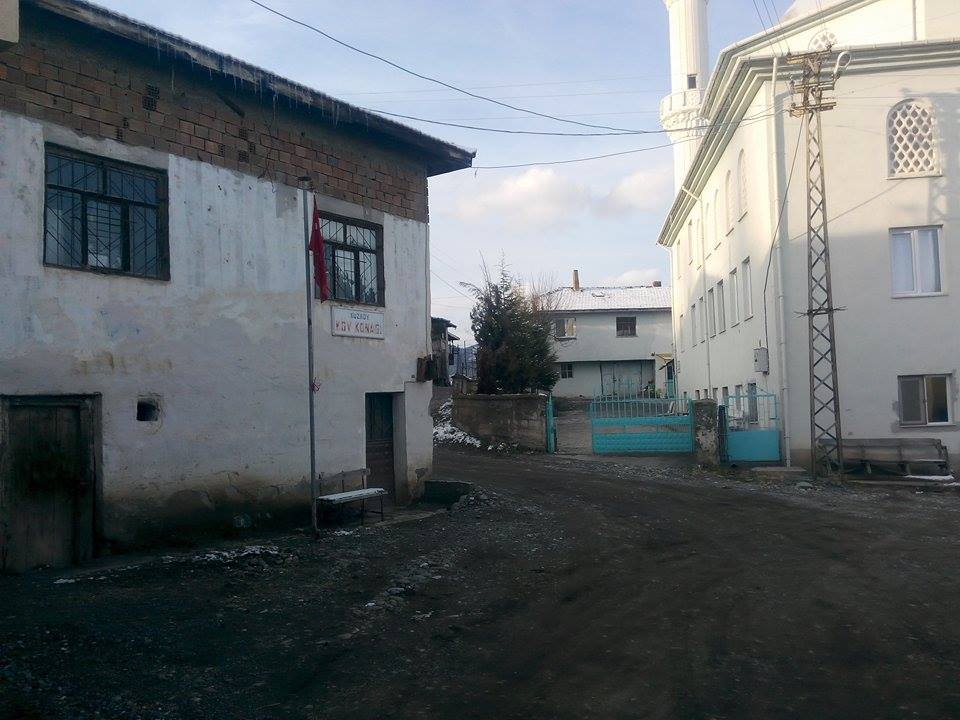

Kuzköy is a village in the İskilip District of Çorum Province in Turkey. Its population is 253 (2022).
