= Karlık, İskilip =

Village in Turkey

Karlık
- Village
- Country: Turkey
- Province: Çorum
- District: İskilip
- Population (2022): 143
- Time zone: UTC+3 (TRT)

Karlık is a village in the İskilip District of Çorum Province in Turkey. Its population is 143 (2022). The village is populated by Kurds.
