= Soğucak, İskilip =

Village in Turkey

Soğucak
- Village
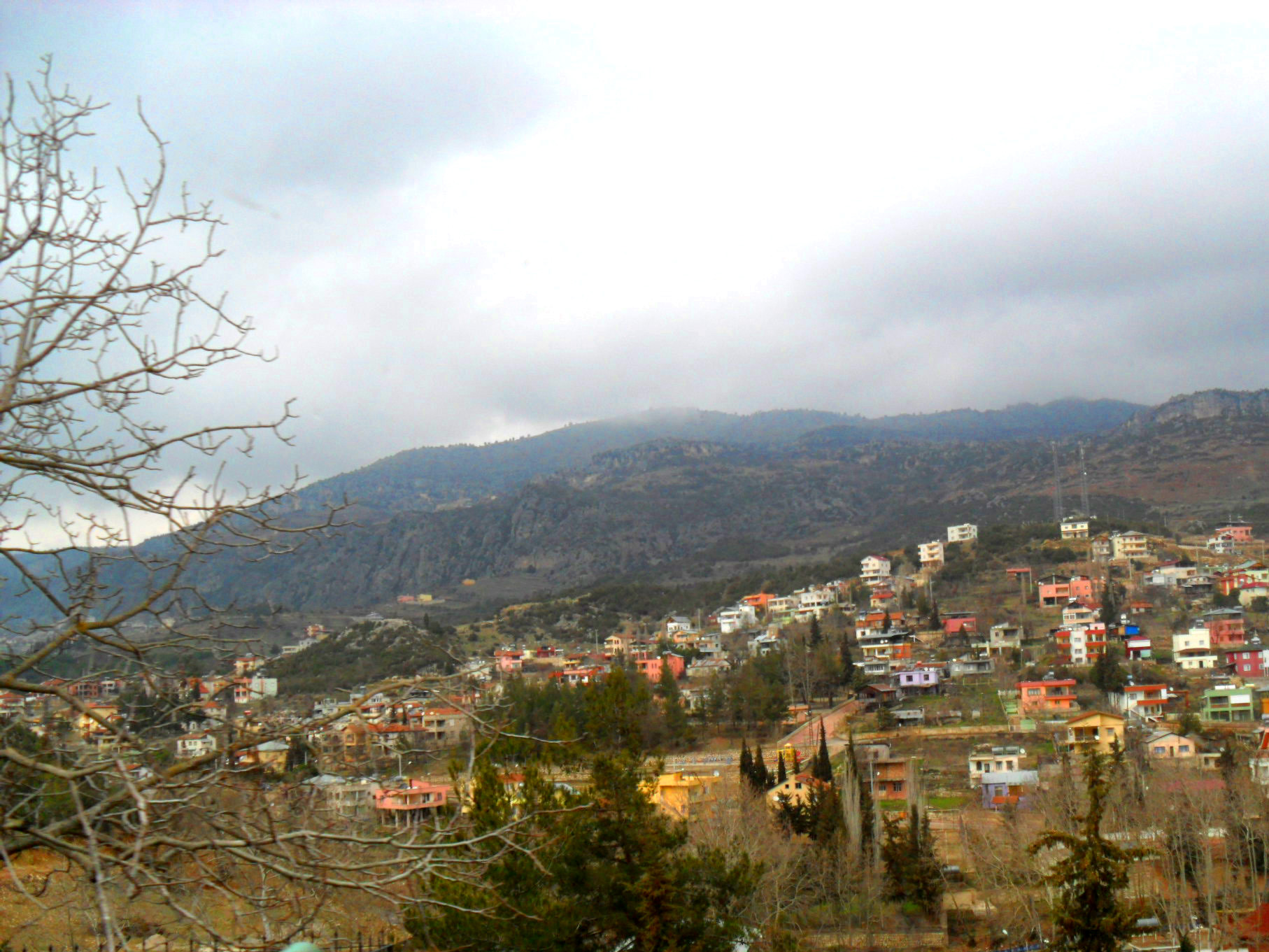

- Location within Turkey
- Coordinates: 40.675°N 34.618°E
- Country: Turkey
- Province: Çorum
- District: İskilip
- Population (2022): 142
- Time zone: UTC+3 (TRT)

Soğucak is a village in the İskilip District of Çorum Province in Turkey. In 2022, its population was 142.
