= Dashushen, Nagorno-Karabakh =

Dashushen / Dashkand Դաշուշեն / Daşkənd
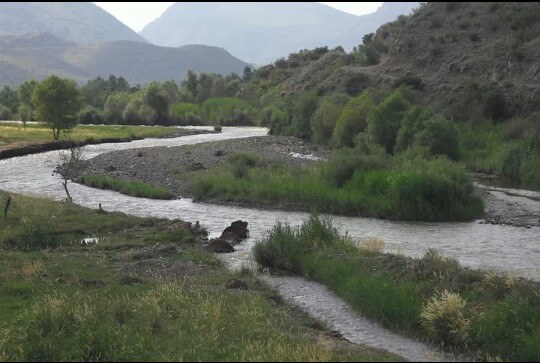
- River near Dashushen

- Location within Azerbaijan Location within Karabakh Economic Region
- Coordinates: 39°47′50″N 46°46′59″E
- Country: Azerbaijan
  - District: Khojaly

Population (2015)
  - Total: 133
- Time zone: UTC+4 (AZT)

Dashushen (Armenian: Դաշուշեն) or Dashkand (Azerbaijani: Daşkənd) is a village in the Khojaly District of Azerbaijan, in the region of Nagorno-Karabakh. Until 2023 it was controlled by the breakaway Republic of Artsakh. The village had an ethnic Armenian-majority population until the expulsion of the Armenian population of Nagorno-Karabakh by Azerbaijan following the 2023 Azerbaijani offensive in Nagorno-Karabakh.

== History ==
During the Soviet period, the village was a part of the Askeran District of the Nagorno-Karabakh Autonomous Oblast. Since October 2023 it is under Azerbaijani forces control.

== Historical heritage sites ==
Historical heritage sites in and around the village include the 17th/18th-century shrine of St. Saribek (Armenian: Սուրբ Սարիբեկ սրբատեղի, romanized: Surb Saribek Srbateghi), the church of Surb Astvatsatsin (Armenian: Սուրբ Աստվածածին, lit. 'Holy Mother of God') built in 1843, a spring monument from 1898, as well as a 19th-century bridge and cemetery.

== Economy and culture ==
The population is mainly engaged in agriculture and animal husbandry. As of 2015, the village has a municipal building, a house of culture, a school, and a medical centre.

== Demographics ==
The village has an ethnic Armenian-majority population, had 120 inhabitants in 2005, and 133 inhabitants in 2015.

== Gallery ==
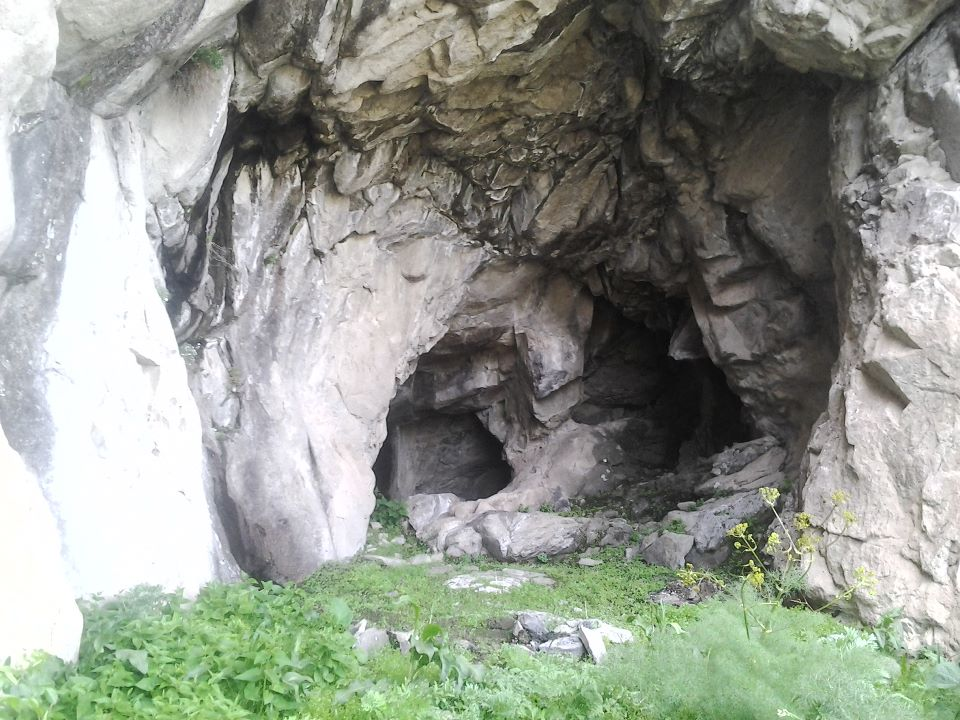
Cave near Dashushen
