= Hally Pancer =

American photographer (born 1961)

Hally Pancer (born 1961) is an American photographer, who lives in Paris, France. She is a visiting professor at Sciences Po in Paris and the École Superieure d'Art et de Design in Amiens, France. Her work has been exhibited in the Museum of Modern Art in New York, the Israel Museum in Jerusalem, the Musée Jeu De Paume in Paris, and has been included in such collections as the Museum of Modern Art, the Bibliothèque Nationale in Paris, the Yale University archives, The Mokum Collection in the Netherlands, and private collections worldwide.

In 1988, after receiving her Master of Fine Arts at Yale University, she moved from the United States to Israel where she was a professor of photography at the Bezalel Academy of Art and Design, Wizo Haifa College of Art and Kalisher School of Art in Tel Aviv. In an effort to influence public opinion about the Middle East peace process, she launched "Beyond Borders," (1995-2001) which brought Israeli and Palestinian teenagers together using photography as a tool for social change. Photos from this project have been exhibited in Belfast, Dublin, Yugoslavia, Kosovo, Jerusalem, Gaza, and several cities in the United States and Europe.

In 2001, she moved to Paris, where she lives with her husband and three children.
