= List of storms named Hallie =

The name Hallie has been used for two tropical cyclones in the Atlantic Ocean:

- Tropical Storm Hallie (1966) – made landfall in Mexico as a weakening tropical storm.
- Tropical Storm Hallie (1975) – paralleled near the coast of the southeastern United States before dissipating.

== See also ==
- Tropical Storm Hali (1992) – a Central Pacific Ocean tropical storm with a similar name.
