= Daşkənd, Yardymli =

Daşkənd
- Municipality
- Location within Azerbaijan
- Coordinates: 38°55′28″N 48°14′41″E
- Country: Azerbaijan
- Rayon: Yardymli

Population
  - Total: 1,086
- Time zone: UTC+4 (AZT)
  - Summer (DST): UTC+5 (AZT)

Daşkənd (also, Dashkend and Tashkend) is a village and municipality in the Yardymli Rayon of Azerbaijan. It has a population of 1,086.
