= Karaçukur, İskilip =

Village in Turkey

Karaçukur
- Village
- Country: Turkey
- Province: Çorum
- District: İskilip
- Population (2022): 89
- Time zone: UTC+3 (TRT)

Karaçukur is a village in the İskilip District of Çorum Province in Turkey. Its population is 89 (2022).
