= Tepe, Bismil =

Village in Diyarbakır Province, Turkey

Tepe
- Neighbourhood
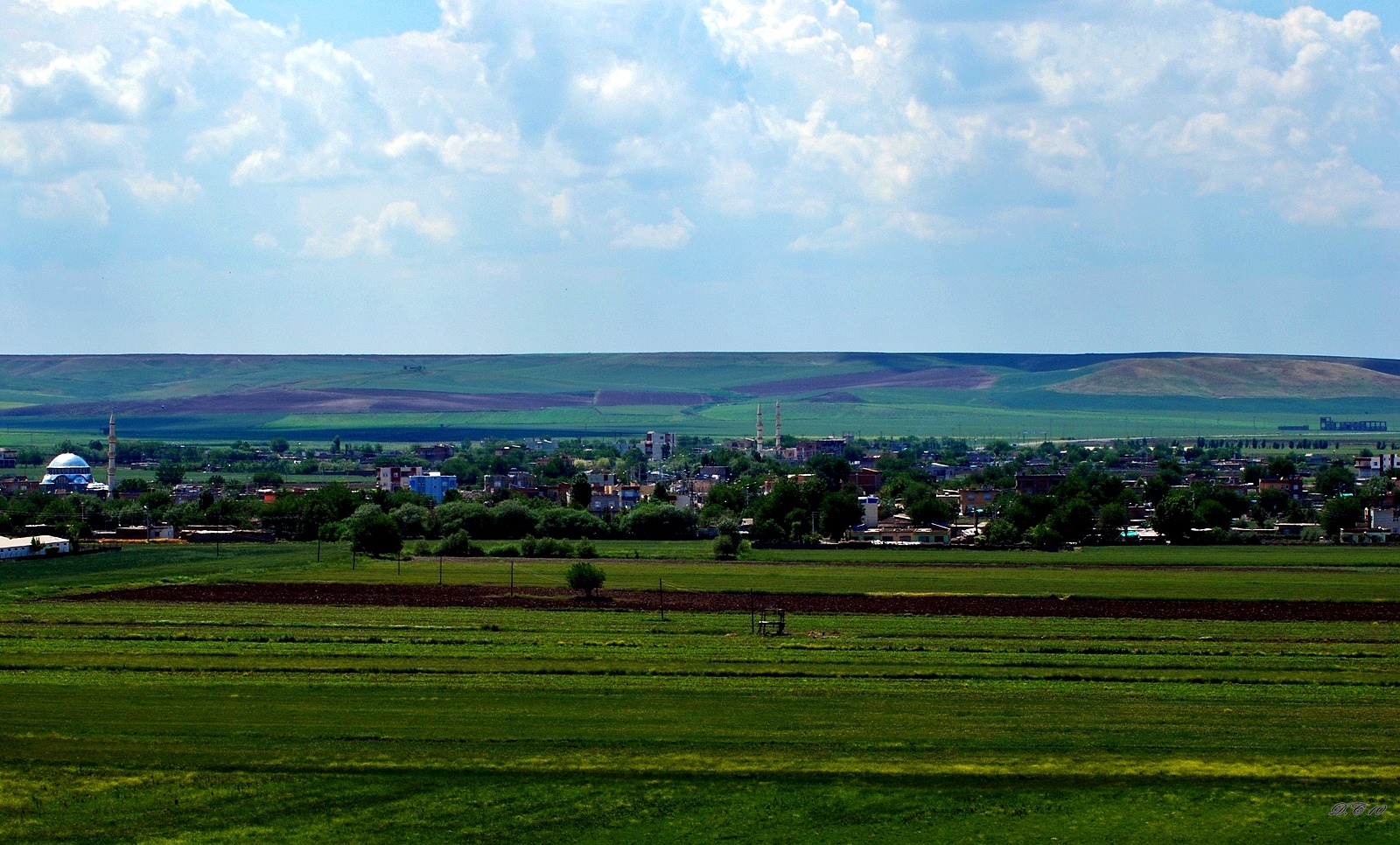

- Location within Turkey
- Coordinates: 37.793°N 40.775°E
- Country: Turkey
- Province: Diyarbakır
- District: Bismil
- Population (2022): 4,500
- Time zone: UTC+3 (TRT)

Tepe (also: Tepeköy, Kurdish: Tepe, Behramkê) is a neighbourhood of the municipality and district of Bismil, Diyarbakır Province, Turkey. Its population is 4,500 (2022). Before the 2013 reorganisation, it was a town (belde). The village is populated by Kurds of the Barava tribe.

== See also ==
- Tushhan
