= Taşkent =

Town in Konya, Turkey

- District and municipality
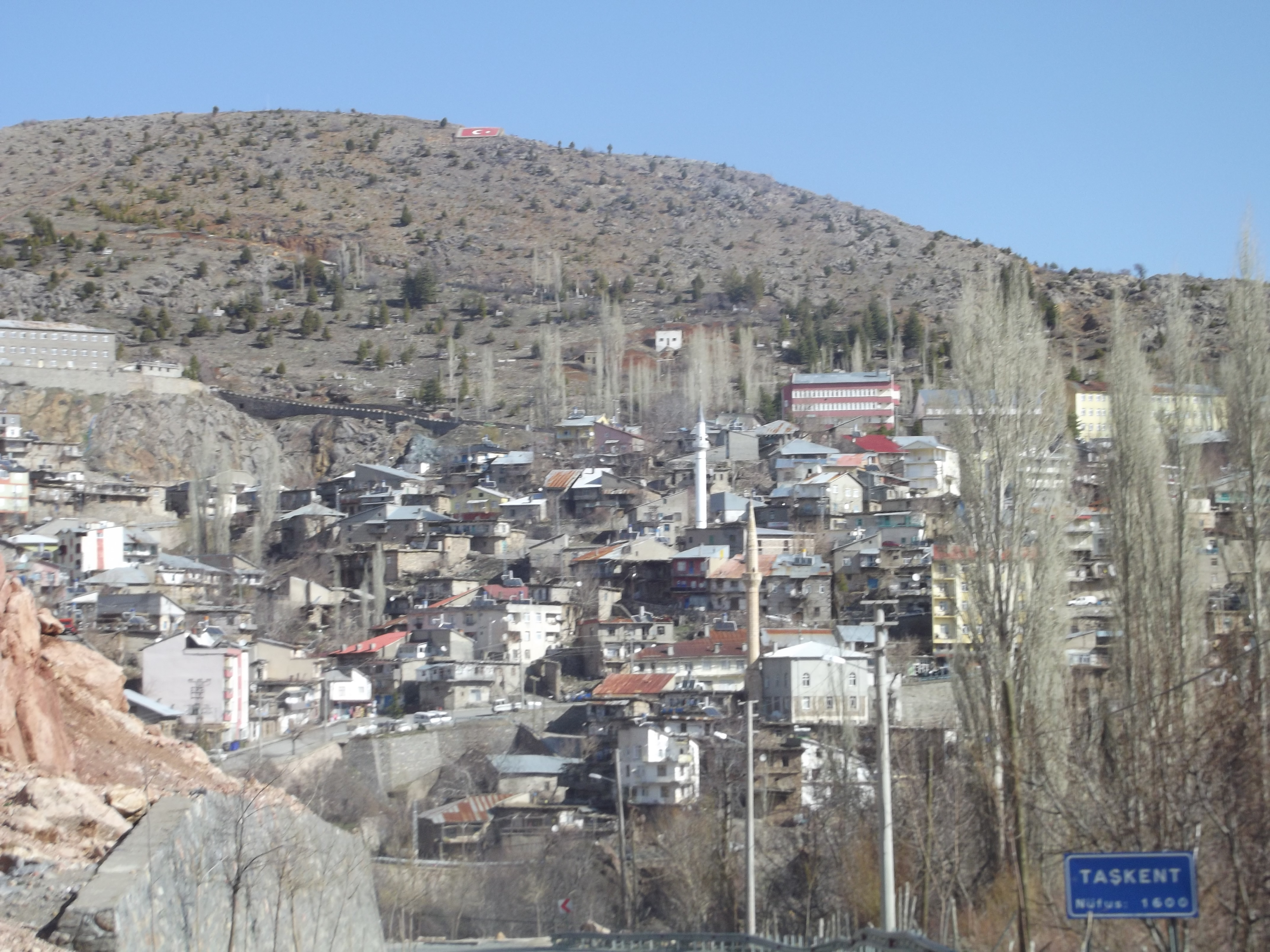

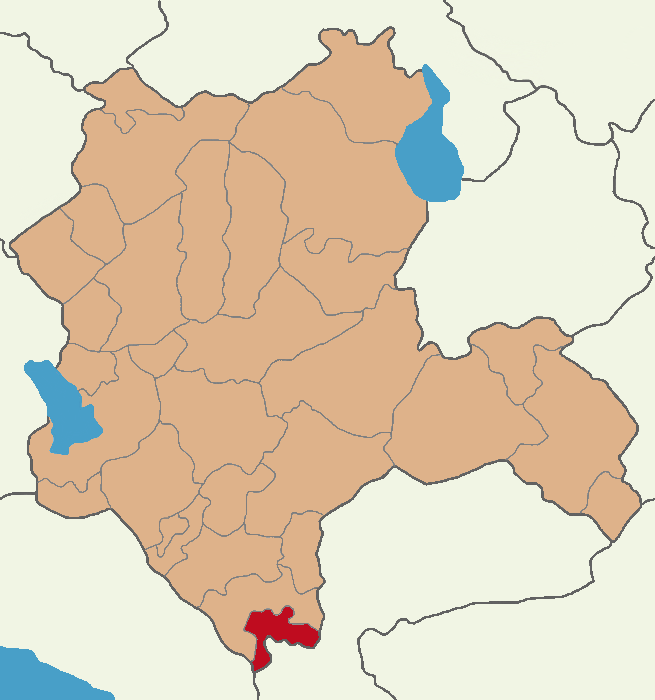
- Map showing Taşkent District in Konya Province

- Location within Turkey Location within Turkey Central Anatolia
- Coordinates: 36°55′24″N 32°29′20″E
- Country: Turkey
- Province: Konya

Government
  - Mayor: Osman Arı (AKP)
- Area: 457 km^{2} (176 sq mi)
- Elevation: 1,550 m (5,090 ft)
- Population (2022): 5,768
  - Density: 12.6/km^{2} (32.7/sq mi)
- Time zone: UTC+3 (TRT)
- Postal code: 42960
- Area code: 0332
- Website: www.taskent.bel.tr

Taşkent (Turkish for 'Stone City'), formerly known as Pirlerkondu, is a municipality and district of Konya Province, Turkey. It has an area of 457 km^{2}, and it has a population of 5,768 (as of 2022).

== Composition ==
There are 15 neighbourhoods in Taşkent District:

- Afşar Tepecik
- Afşar Yukarı
- Balcılar Orta
- Balcılar Veliler
- Balcılar Yukarı
- Bektaş
- Bolay
- Çetmi Cömeşpınar
- Çetmi Yeni
- Hıra
- Ilıcapınar
- Keçimen
- Kongul
- Sazak
- Şıhlar
