= Verkhniye Tatyshly =

Verkhniye Tatyshly Верхние Татышлы
- Selo

Other transcription(s)
  - Bashkir: Үрге Тәтешле
- Interactive map of Verkhniye Tatyshly
- Location of Verkhniye Tatyshly Verkhniye Tatyshly (Bashkortostan)
- Coordinates: 56°17′25″N 55°51′14″E
- Country: Russia
- Federal subject: Bashkortostan
- Administrative district: Tatyshlinsky District
- Founded: 1703

Population (2010 Census)
  - Total: 6,645
  - Estimate (2010): 6,645 (0%)

Administrative status
  - Capital of: Tatyshlinsky District
- Time zone: UTC+5 (MSK+2)
- Postal code: 452830
- OKTMO ID: 80650425101

Verkhniye Tatyshly (Russian: Ве́рхние Татышлы́; Bashkir: Үрге Тәтешле, Örgi Tətişli) is a rural locality (a selo) and the administrative center of Tatyshlinsky District in the Republic of Bashkortostan, Russia. Population: 6,645 (2010 census); 6,329 (2002 census); 5,282 (1989 Soviet census).
