= Tatyshlinsky District =

Tatyshlinsky District Татышлинский район (Russian)
- District

Other transcription(s)
  - Bashkir: Тәтешле районы
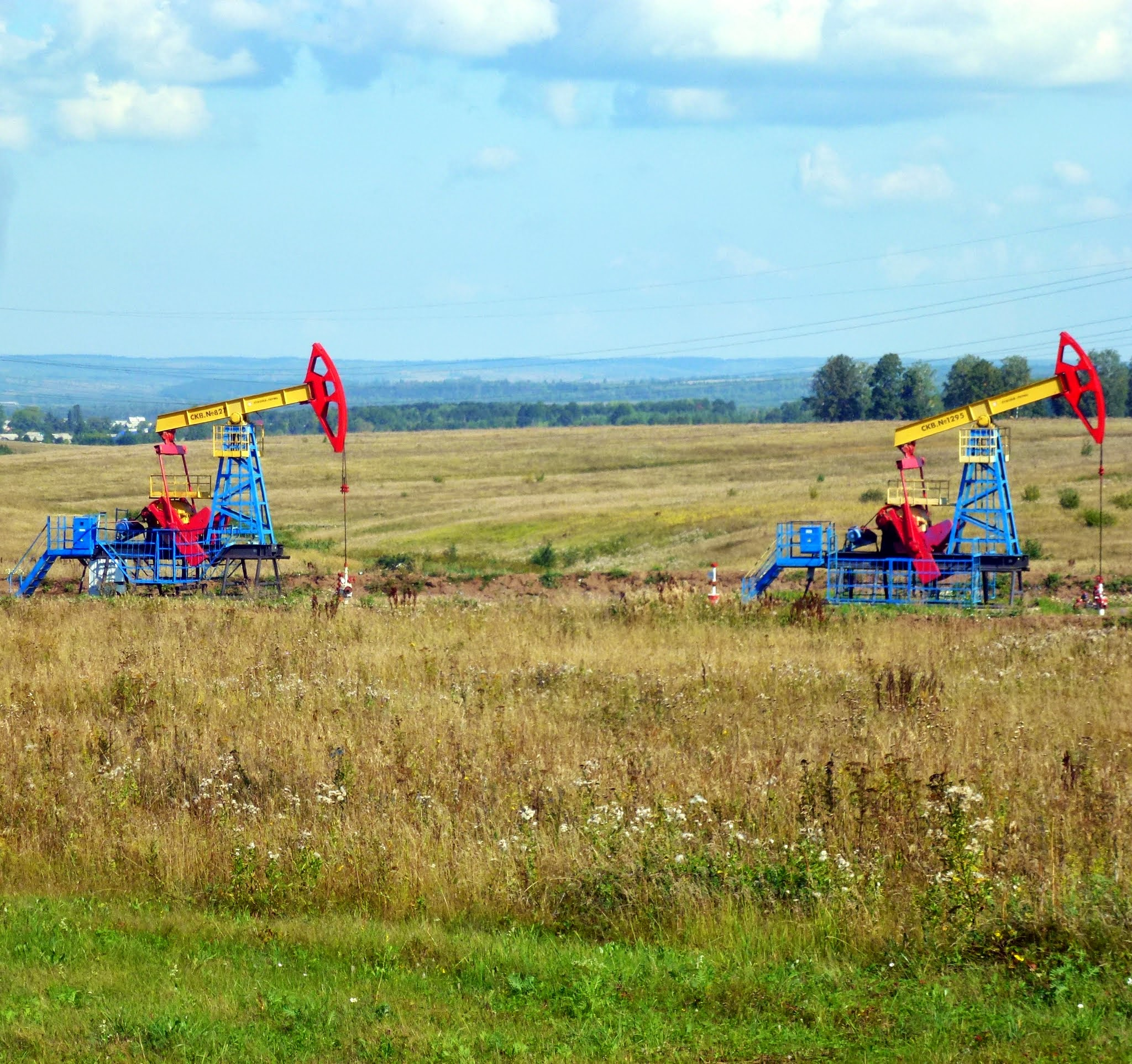
- Oil production in Tatyshlinsky District

- Flag Coat of arms
- Location of Tatyshlinsky District in the Republic of Bashkortostan
- Coordinates: 56°17′N 55°51′E
- Country: Russia
- Federal subject: Republic of Bashkortostan
- Established: 1935
- Administrative center: Verkhniye Tatyshly

Area
  - Total: 1,376.16 km^{2} (531.34 sq mi)

Population (2010 Census)
  - Total: 25,159
  - Estimate (2018): 22,703 (−9.8%)
  - Density: 18.282/km^{2} (47.350/sq mi)
  - Urban: 0%
  - Rural: 100%

Administrative structure
  - Administrative divisions: 13 Selsoviets
  - Inhabited localities: 75 rural localities

Municipal structure
  - Municipally incorporated as: Tatyshlinsky Municipal District
  - Municipal divisions: 0 urban settlements, 13 rural settlements
- Time zone: UTC+5 (MSK+2)
- OKTMO ID: 80650000
- Website: https://tatyshlinski.bashkortostan.ru/

Population of Tatyshlinsky District
- 2010 Census: 25,159
- 2002 Census: 26,803
- 1989 Census: 26,209
- 1979 Census: 30,378

Tatyshlinsky District (Russian: Татышли́нский райо́н; Bashkir: Тәтешле районы, Täteşle rayonı) is an administrative and municipal district (raion), one of the fifty-four in the Republic of Bashkortostan, Russia. It is located in the north of the republic and borders Perm Krai to the north, Askinsky District to the east, Baltachevsky District to the southeast and south, Burayevsky District to the south and Yanaulsky District to the southwest and west. The area of the district is 1,376.16 square kilometers (531.34 sq mi). Its administrative center is the rural locality (a selo) of Verkhniye Tatyshly. As of the 2010 Census, the total population of the district was 25,159, with the population of Verkhniye Tatyshly accounting for 26.4% of that number.

== History ==
The district was established in 1935.

== Administrative and municipal status ==
Within the framework of administrative divisions, Tatyshlinsky District is one of the fifty-four in the Republic of Bashkortostan. The district is divided into thirteen selsoviets, comprising seventy-five rural localities. As a municipal division, the district is incorporated as Tatyshlinsky Municipal District. Its thirteen selsoviets are incorporated as thirteen rural settlements within the municipal district. The selo of Verkhniye Tatyshly serves as the administrative center of both the administrative and municipal district.
