= Çakır =

Çakır is a Turkish surname, that derives from colour blue. It was often associated with people who had blue eyes, which are uncommon in Turkey. Notable people with the surname include:

== People ==
- Aslı Çakır Alptekin (born 1985), Turkish female middle-distance runner
- Ahmet Çakır, Turkish politician
- Bilal Omer Cakir (born 1990), Turkish curler
- Cüneyt Çakır (born 1976), Turkish UEFA Elite association football referee
- Deniz Çakır, Turkish actress
- Faruk Çakır (born 1995), Turkish football goalkeeper
- Hamza Çakır (born 1985), German football player of Turkish descent
- Jirayr Ohanyan Çakır, Turkish-Armenian chess player
- Mehmet Çakır (born 1984), Turkish footballer
- Mihail Ciachir (1861 – 1938), Moldovan and Gagauz Protoiereus
- Muhammet Emin Çakır, Turkish Greco-Roman wrestler
- Mustafa Çakır (born 1986), Turkish yacht racer
- Olcay Çakır (born 1993), Turkish female basketball player
- Onurcan Çakır (born 1995), Turkish volleyball player
- Osman Çakır (born 1967), Turkish football defender
- Sabri Çakır (1955–2024), German poet of Turkish origin
- Seher Çakır (born 1971), Turkish woman poet
- Selim Çakır (1918 – before 2013), Turkish equestrian
- Uğurcan Çakır (born 1996), Turkish football goalkeeper
- Umut Çakır, Turkish volleyball coach and former player
- Ushan Çakır, Turkish actor
- Zihni Çakır, Turkish journalist and author

== Places ==
- Çakır, Acıpayam, in Turkey
- Çakır, Çorum, a town in Turkey
- Çakır, Yenice, in Turkey

== Other uses ==
- Çakır (missile), Turkish cruise missile

== See also ==
- Çakırağa Mansion, mansion in Turkey
- Mehmet Çakır Cultural and Sports Center, cultural and sports complex in Üsküdar district, Istanbul, Turkey
