= INAC =

INAC may refer to:

- Indigenous and Northern Affairs Canada, a department of the Government of Canada (formerly Indian and Northern Affairs Canada and Aboriginal Affairs and Northern Development Canada)
- Instituto Nacional de Aviación Civil, the Argentine aviation institution
- National Institute of Civil Aviation (Instituto Nacional de Aeronáutica Civil), the former Venezuelan civil aviation agency
- Nicaraguan Civil Aeronautics Institute (Instituto Nicaragüense de Aeronáutica Civil), the Nicaraguan civil aviation agency
- Istituto Nazionale per le Applicazioni del Calcolo (National Institute for the Application of Calculus, now Istituto per le Applicazioni del Calcolo "Mauro Picone"), Italian scientific institution on applied mathematics
- Instituto Nacional de Cultura, a Panamanian governmental agency
- National Meat Institute (Instituto Nacional de Carnes), a Uruguayan governmental agency
- INAC Kobe Leonessa, Japanese football club
- İnaç, Çankırı
