= Aşağıçavuş =

Aşağıçavuş can refer to:

- Aşağıçavuş, Çankırı
- Aşağıçavuş, Yenice
