= Yukarıçavuş =

Yukarıçavuş can refer to:

- Yukarıçavuş, Çankırı
- Yukarıçavuş, Yenice
