= Karaşeyh =

Karaşeyh can refer to:

- Karaşeyh, Adilcevaz
- Karaşeyh, Çankırı
- Karaşeyh, Çat
