= Çayırpınar =

Çayırpınar can refer to:

- Çayırpınar, Çankırı
- Çayırpınar, Çay
