= Doğantepe =

Doğantepe can refer to:

- Doğantepe, Amasya
- Doğantepe, Çankırı
