= Çatalelma =

Çatalelma can refer to:

- Çatalelma, Çankırı
- Çatalelma, Şenkaya
