= Dutağaç =

Dutağaç can refer to:

- Dutağaç, Bozdoğan
- Dutağaç, Çankırı
