= Hidirlik =

Hıdırlık can refer to:

- Hıdırlık Tower
- Hıdırlık, Çankırı
