= Seyvan =

Seyvan can refer to:

- another name for Sagban, Iran
- Seyvan, Yenice, Turkey
