= İncik =

İncik can refer to:

- İncik, Çankırı
- İncik, Emirdağ
