= Ağzıbüyük =

Ağzıbüyük can refer to:

- Ağzıbüyük, Çankırı
- Ağzıbüyük, Yüreğir
