= Çırçır =

Çırçır can refer to:

- Çırçır, Alaca
- Çırçır, Çankırı
