= Dedeköy =

Dedeköy may refer to:

- Dedeköy, Çankırı
- Dedeköy, Dicle
- Dedeköy, Koçarlı, a village in Aydın Province, Turkey
- Dedeköy, Hamamözü, a village in Amasya Province, Turkey
- Dedeköy, Mudanya
