= Kobara =

Town of ancient Paphlagonia

Coordinates: 40°33′59″N 33°38′11″E

Kobara was a town of ancient Paphlagonia, inhabited in Byzantine times. The name does not occur among ancient authors but is inferred from epigraphic and other evidence.

Its site is located near Doğantepe, Asiatic Turkey.
