= 2018–19 İstanbul Başakşehir F.K. season =

İstanbul Başakşehir
2018–19 season
- President: Göksel Gümüşdağ
- Head coach: Abdullah Avcı
- Stadium: Başakşehir Fatih Terim Stadium
- Süper Lig: 2nd
- Turkish Cup: Round of 16
- UEFA Europa League: Third qualifying round
- Top goalscorer: League: Edin Višća (13 goals); All: Edin Višća (14 goals)
Home colours	Away colours	Third colours

The 2018–19 season was İstanbul Başakşehir's fifth consecutive season in the Süper Lig and their 29th year in existence.

== Season summary ==
Başakşehir sat at the top of the Süper Lig table for most of the season and the club looked to be on their way to clinching their first major trophy before losing out to city rivals Galatasaray following defeat to the same club in May 2020. Playmaker Edin Višća was named the Süper Lig player of the season at the end of season awards ceremony.

== Squad ==
As of 31 January 2019

Note: Flags indicate national team as defined under FIFA eligibility rules; some limited exceptions apply. Players may hold more than one non-FIFA nationality.

No.	Pos.	Nation	Player
1	GK	TUR	Volkan Babacan
3	DF	FRA	Gaël Clichy
4	DF	GHA	Joseph Attamah
5	MF	TUR	Emre Belözoğlu (Captain)
6	DF	MDA	Alexandru Epureanu
7	MF	BIH	Edin Višća
8	MF	BRA	Marcio Mossoró
9	FW	BIH	Riad Bajić (on loan from Udinese)
10	FW	TOG	Emmanuel Adebayor
11	MF	NED	Eljero Elia
13	DF	RUS	Fyodor Kudryashov
14	MF	TUR	Arda Turan (on loan from Barcelona)
17	MF	TUR	İrfan Can Kahveci

No.	Pos.	Nation	Player
18	FW	ITA	Stefano Napoleoni
19	FW	SEN	Demba Ba
20	MF	TUR	Soner Aydogdu
21	MF	TUR	Mahmut Tekdemir
28	MF	SRB	Miloš Jojić
33	DF	TUR	Uğur Uçar
34	GK	TUR	Mert Günok
35	DF	GER	Serdar Tasci
39	DF	TUR	Alparslan Erdem
55	GK	TUR	Faruk Çakır
70	FW	BRA	Robinho
80	DF	BRA	Júnior Caiçara
88	MF	SUI	Gökhan Inler

=== U21 players ===
Only professional players and/or players with first team numbers are listed. Note: Flags indicate national team as defined under FIFA eligibility rules; some limited exceptions apply. Players may hold more than one non-FIFA nationality.

No.	Pos.	Nation	Player
—	GK	TUR	Said Kıvanç
25	DF	TUR	Emre Keskin
65	DF	TUR	Yusuf Avcılar

No.	Pos.	Nation	Player
—	MF	TUR	Kerem Aktürkoğlu
—	FW	TUR	Serhat Akyün

=== Out on loan ===
Note: Flags indicate national team as defined under FIFA eligibility rules; some limited exceptions apply. Players may hold more than one non-FIFA nationality.

No.	Pos.	Nation	Player
9	FW	TUR	Mehmet Batdal (at Fatih Karagümrük)
57	MF	GER	Cihan Yıldız (at Erokspor)
59	MF	TUR	Okan Saraçoğlu (at Ankara Adliyespor)
61	FW	TUR	Oktay Bala (at Darıca Gençlerbirliği)
96	MF	TUR	Altuğ Taş (at Bandırmaspor)
97	DF	TUR	Enes Subaşı (at Darıca Gençlerbirliği)
98	DF	TUR	Alper Karaman (at Erokspor)
—	DF	TUR	Berk Nebioğlu (at Erokspor)
—	DF	TUR	Mert Vurak (at Darıca Gençlerbirliği)

No.	Pos.	Nation	Player
—	DF	TUR	Muharrem Öner (at Erokspor)
25	MF	SEN	Cheikhou Dieng (at Spartak Subotica)
—	MF	TUR	Recep Kuşçu (at Arsinspor)
—	MF	TUR	Cerem Dinçer (at Erokspor)
—	FW	TUR	Barış Güral (at Erokspor)
—	FW	TUR	Ertuğrul Köktürk (at Kozan Belediyespor)
—	FW	TUR	Atabey Çiçek (at Adana Demirspor)
—	MF	TUR	Tunay Torun (at Bursaspor)

=== Other players under contract ===
Note: Flags indicate national team as defined under FIFA eligibility rules; some limited exceptions apply. Players may hold more than one non-FIFA nationality.

No.	Pos.	Nation	Player
95	MF	TUR	Mustafa Toprak

== Competitions ==
=== Süper Lig ===
==== League table ====
Pos	Team	Pld	W	D	L	GF	GA	GD	Pts	Qualification or relegation
1	Galatasaray (C)	34	20	9	5	72	36	+36	69	Qualification for the Champions League group stage
2	Başakşehir	34	19	10	5	49	22	+27	67	Qualification for the Champions League third qualifying round
3	Beşiktaş	34	19	8	7	72	46	+26	65	Qualification for the Europa League group stage
4	Trabzonspor	34	18	9	7	64	46	+18	63	Qualification for the Europa League third qualifying round
5	Yeni Malatyaspor	34	13	8	13	47	46	+1	47	Qualification for the Europa League second qualifying round

Source: Süper Lig, Soccerway
Rules for classification: 1) Points; 2) Head-to-head points; 3) Head-to-head goal difference; 4) Head-to-head goals scored; 5) Goal difference; 6) Goals scored; 7) Play-off.
(C) Champions

==== Positions by round ====
The following table represents Başakşehir's positions after each round in the competition.

Team ╲ Round	1	2	3	4	5	6	7	8	9	10	11	12	13	14	15	16	17	18	19	20	21	22	23	24	25	26	27	28	29	30	31	32	33	34
İstanbul Başakşehir	4	7	4	3	2	1	2	2	2	1	1	1	1	1	1	1	1	1	1	1	1	1	1	1	1	1	1	1	1	1	2	2	2	2

Leader and 2019–20 Champions League group stage
2019–20 UEFA Champions League second qualifying round
2019–20 UEFA Europa League third qualifying round
2019–20 UEFA Europa League second qualifying round

Source: tff.org (in Turkish)

==== Matches ====
12 August 2018 1	İstanbul Başakşehir	2–0	Trabzonspor	Başakşehir
19:30 TRT (UTC+3)		Report		Stadium: Başakşehir Fatih Terim Stadium

20 August 2018 2	Kasımpaşa	2–1	İstanbul Başakşehir	Istanbul
21:45 TRT (UTC+3)		Report		Stadium: Recep Tayyip Erdoğan Stadium

27 August 2018 3	İstanbul Başakşehir	3–1	Akhisarspor	Başakşehir
19:15 TRT (UTC+3)		Report		Stadium: Başakşehir Fatih Terim Stadium

2 September 2018 4	BB Erzurumspor	0–1	İstanbul Başakşehir	Erzurum
19:15 TRT (UTC+3)		Report		Stadium: Erzurum Kazım Karabekir Stadium

16 September 2018 5	İstanbul Başakşehir	4–0	Antalyaspor	Başakşehir
17:00 TRT (UTC+3)		Report		Stadium: Başakşehir Fatih Terim Stadium

21 September 2018 6	Bursaspor	0–0	İstanbul Başakşehir	Bursa
20:00 TRT (UTC+3)		Report		Stadium: Bursa Büyükşehir Belediye Stadium

1 October 2018 7	İstanbul Başakşehir	1–1	Yeni Malatyaspor	Başakşehir
20:00 TRT (UTC+3)		Report		Stadium: Başakşehir Fatih Terim Stadium

7 October 2018 8	Fenerbahçe	0–0	İstanbul Başakşehir	Istanbul
18:00 TRT (UTC+3)		Report		Stadium: Şükrü Saracoğlu Stadium

20 October 2018 9	İstanbul Başakşehir	1–0	Kayserispor	Başakşehir
16:00 TRT (UTC+3)		Report		Stadium: Başakşehir Fatih Terim Stadium

27 October 2018 10	Konyaspor	0–1	İstanbul Başakşehir	Konya
16:00 TRT (UTC+3)		Report		Stadium: Konya Büyükşehir Belediye Stadium

3 November 2018 11	İstanbul Başakşehir	1–0	Beşiktaş	Başakşehir
19:00 TRT (UTC+3)		Report		Stadium: Başakşehir Fatih Terim Stadium

10 November 2018 12	Çaykur Rizespor	1–2	İstanbul Başakşehir	Rize
16:00 TRT (UTC+3)		Report		Stadium: Rize Şehir Stadium

26 November 2018 13	Göztepe	0–2	İstanbul Başakşehir	İzmir
20:00 TRT (UTC+3)		Report		Stadium: Bornova Stadium

1 December 2018 14	İstanbul Başakşehir	0–1	Sivasspor	Başakşehir
16:00 TRT (UTC+3)		Report		Stadium: Başakşehir Fatih Terim Stadium

10 December 2018 15	Ankaragücü	0–1	İstanbul Başakşehir	Afyonkarahisar
20:00 TRT (UTC+3)		Report		Stadium: Afyon Zafer Stadium

15 December 2018 16	İstanbul Başakşehir	1–1	Galatasaray	Başakşehir
19:00 TRT (UTC+3)		Report		Stadium: Başakşehir Fatih Terim Stadium

22 December 2018 17	Alanyaspor	1–1	İstanbul Başakşehir	Alanya
16:00 TRT (UTC+3)		Report		Stadium: Alanya Bahçeşehir Okulları Stadium

20 January 2019 18	Trabzonspor	2–4	İstanbul Başakşehir	Trabzon
19:00 TRT (UTC+3)		Report		Stadium: Şenol Güneş Stadium

28 January 2019 19	İstanbul Başakşehir	2–0	Kasımpaşa	Başakşehir
20:00 TRT (UTC+3)		Report		Stadium: Başakşehir Fatih Terim Stadium

3 February 2019 20	Akhisarspor	0–3	İstanbul Başakşehir	Akhisar
16:00 TRT (UTC+3)		Report		Stadium: Akhisar Stadium

9 February 2019 21	İstanbul Başakşehir	1–1	BB Erzurumspor	Başakşehir
16:00 TRT (UTC+3)		Report		Stadium: Başakşehir Fatih Terim Stadium

18 February 2019 22	Antalyaspor	0–1	İstanbul Başakşehir	Antalya
20:00 TRT (UTC+3)		Report		Stadium: Antalya Stadium

24 February 2019 23	İstanbul Başakşehir	3–0	Bursaspor	Başakşehir
19:00 TRT (UTC+3)		Report		Stadium: Başakşehir Fatih Terim Stadium

3 March 2019 24	Yeni Malatyaspor	0–2	İstanbul Başakşehir	Malatya
16:00 TRT (UTC+3)		Report		Stadium: Malatya Stadium

9 March 2019 25	İstanbul Başakşehir	2–1	Fenerbahçe	Başakşehir
19:00 TRT (UTC+3)		Report		Stadium: Başakşehir Fatih Terim Stadium

17 March 2019 26	Kayserispor	1–1	İstanbul Başakşehir	Kayseri
16:00 TRT (UTC+3)		Report		Stadium: Kayseri Kadir Has Stadium

7 April 2019 27	İstanbul Başakşehir	2–0	Konyaspor	Başakşehir
19:00 TRT (UTC+3)		Report		Stadium: Başakşehir Fatih Terim Stadium

13 April 2019 28	Beşiktaş	2–1	İstanbul Başakşehir	Istanbul
19:00 TRT (UTC+3)		Report		Stadium: Vodafone Park

21 April 2019 29	İstanbul Başakşehir	1–1	Çaykur Rizespor	Başakşehir
16:00 TRT (UTC+3)		Report		Stadium: Başakşehir Fatih Terim Stadium

26 April 2019 30	İstanbul Başakşehir	0–2	Göztepe	Başakşehir
20:30 TRT (UTC+3)		Report		Stadium: Başakşehir Fatih Terim Stadium

3 May 2019 31	Sivasspor	0–0	İstanbul Başakşehir	Sivas
20:30 TRT (UTC+3)		Report		Stadium: Sivas 4 Eylül Stadium

12 May 2019 32	İstanbul Başakşehir	2–1	Ankaragücü	Başakşehir
19:00 TRT (UTC+3)		Report		Stadium: Başakşehir Fatih Terim Stadium

19 May 2019 33	Galatasaray	2–1	İstanbul Başakşehir	Istanbul
19:00 TRT (UTC+3)		Report		Stadium: Türk Telekom Stadium

24 May 2019 34	İstanbul Başakşehir	1–1	Alanyaspor	Başakşehir
18:00 TRT (UTC+3)		Report		Stadium: Başakşehir Fatih Terim Stadium

=== Turkish Cup ===
==== Fourth round ====
5 December 2018	Adana Demirspor	1–1	İstanbul Başakşehir	Adana
20:30	Taşdelen 54' (pen.)		Visca 85' (pen.)	Stadium: 5 Ocak Fatih Terim

18 December 2018	İstanbul Başakşehir	2–0	Adana Demirspor	Istanbul
19:00	Epureanu 6'; Frei 33'			Stadium: Başakşehir Fatih Terim Stadium

Başakşehir won 3–1 on aggregate.

==== Round of 16 ====
16 January 2019	İstanbul Başakşehir	1–0	Hatayspor	Istanbul
18:30	Adebayor 32'			Stadium: Başakşehir Fatih Terim Stadium

24 January 2019	Hatayspor	4–1	İstanbul Başakşehir	Antakya
13:00	Abdioğlu 12'; Aydın 25'; Ilgaz 43'; Aydın 65'		Jojic 19'	Stadium: Antakya Atatürk Stadium

Hatayspor won 4–2 on aggregate.

=== Europa League ===
==== Third qualifying round ====
9 August 2018	İstanbul Başakşehir (Turkey)	0–0	(England) Burnley	Istanbul, Turkey
20:00 (21:00 TRT)		Report		Stadium: Başakşehir Fatih Terim Stadium; Attendance: 4,503; Referee: Srđan Jovanović (Serbia)

16 August 2018	Burnley (England)	1–0 (a.e.t.)	(Turkey) İstanbul Başakşehir	Burnley, England
20:45 (19:45 BST)	Cork 97'	Report		Stadium: Turf Moor; Attendance: 16,583; Referee: István Kovács (Romania)

Burnley won 1–0 on aggregate.
