= Sameteli =

Sameteli can refer to:

- Sameteli, Çan
- Sameteli, Yenice
