= Akçakoyun =

- Village
- Location within Turkey Location within Marmara
- Coordinates: 39°49′N 27°10′E
- Country: Turkey
- Province: Çanakkale
- District: Yenice
- Elevation: 260 m (850 ft)
- Population (2021): 898
- Time zone: UTC+3 (TRT)
- Postal code: 17560
- Area code: 0286

Akçakoyun (literally "white sheep") is a village in Yenice District of Çanakkale Province, Turkey. Its population is 898 (2021). Before the 2013 reorganisation, it was a town (belde). Akçakoyun is situated to west of Kalkım pond and to the south of Agonya creek. The distance to Yenice is 45 kilometres (28 mi).

The history of Akçakoyun is somewhat intermingled with that of Kalkım, a town to the east of Akçakoyun. The area around Akçakoyun, then named Agonya was an important ironworking center during the ancient ages. During the Turkish rule, originally a single settlement, it was split into two, namely Kalkım and Akçakoyun. In 1995, the settlement was declared a seat of township. Main economic sector of the town is fruit farming. Forestry, animal breeding and hunting tourism are other sectors.
