= Tuzlu =

Tuzlu can refer to:

- Tuzlu, Ardabil
- Tuzlu, Çankırı
- Towzlu
