= Ayan, Çankırı =

Village in Turkey

Ayan
- Village
- Location in Turkey Ayan (Turkey Central Anatolia)
- Coordinates: 40.6710°N 33.5978°E
- Country: Turkey
- Province: Çankırı
- District: Çankırı
- Population (2021): 157
- Time zone: UTC+3 (TRT)

Ayan is a village in the Çankırı District of Çankırı Province in Turkey. Its population is 157 (2021).
