= 1953 Torud earthquake =

Earthquake in Iran

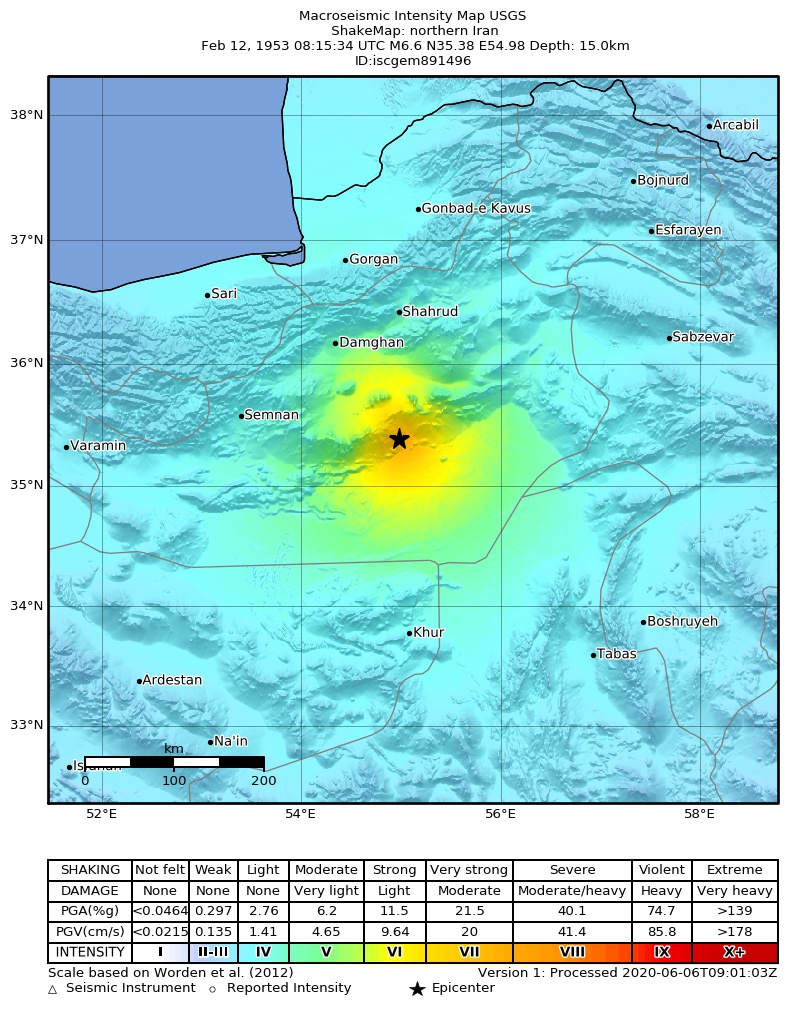

- Location within Iran
- UTC time: 1953-02-12 08:15:34
- ISC event: 891496
- USGS-ANSS: ComCat
- Local date: 12 February 1953
- Local time: 11:45:34
- Magnitude: 6.6 M_{w}
- Depth: 15 km (9.3 mi)
- Epicenter: 35.39°N 54.98°E
- Type: Reverse
- Areas affected: Iran
- Max. intensity: MMI VIII (Severe)
- Casualties: 800–973 killed 140 injured

The 1953 Torud earthquake occurred at the northeastern border of the Great Salt Kavir in Torud, Semnan, Iran on 12 February. The shock had a moment magnitude of 6.6 and had a maximum Mercalli intensity of VIII (Severe). At least 800 people were killed.

== See also ==
- List of earthquakes in 1953
- List of earthquakes in Iran
