= Germece, Çankırı =

Village in Turkey

Germece
- Village
- Location in Turkey Germece (Turkey Central Anatolia)
- Coordinates: 40°24′N 33°41′E
- Country: Turkey
- Province: Çankırı
- District: Çankırı
- Population (2021): 331
- Time zone: UTC+3 (TRT)

Germece is a village in the Çankırı District of Çankırı Province in Turkey. Its population is 331 (2021).
