= Oğlanalanı, Yenice =

Village in Turkey

Oğlanalanı
- Village
- Location in Turkey Oğlanalanı (Marmara)
- Coordinates: 39°50′N 27°05′E
- Country: Turkey
- Province: Çanakkale
- District: Yenice
- Population (2021): 84
- Time zone: UTC+3 (TRT)

Oğlanalanı is a village in the Yenice District of Çanakkale Province in Turkey. Its population is 84 (2021).
