= Çukuroba, Yenice =

Village in Turkey

Çukuroba
- Village
- Location in Turkey Çukuroba (Marmara)
- Coordinates: 39.763°N 27.276°E
- Country: Turkey
- Province: Çanakkale
- District: Yenice
- Population (2021): 195
- Time zone: UTC+3 (TRT)

Çukuroba is a village in the Yenice District of Çanakkale Province in Turkey. Its population is 195 (2021).
