= Gümüşler, Yenice =

Village in Turkey

Gümüşler
- Village
- Location in Turkey Gümüşler (Marmara)
- Coordinates: 39°54′29″N 27°22′40″E
- Country: Turkey
- Province: Çanakkale
- District: Yenice
- Population (2021): 332
- Time zone: UTC+3 (TRT)

Gümüşler is a village in the Yenice District of Çanakkale Province in Turkey. Its population is 332 (2021).
