= Yenice District, Çanakkale =

District of Çanakkale Province, Turkey

Yenice District
- District
- Map showing Yenice District in Çanakkale Province

- Location in Turkey Yenice District (Marmara)
- Coordinates: 39°56′N 27°15′E
- Country: Turkey
- Province: Çanakkale
- Seat: Yenice

Government
  - Kaymakam: Musa Göktaş
- Area: 1,381 km^{2} (533 sq mi)
- Population (2021): 31,080
  - Density: 23/km^{2} (58/sq mi)
- Time zone: UTC+3 (TRT)
- Website: www.canakkaleyenice.gov.tr

Yenice District is a district of the Çanakkale Province of Turkey. Its seat is the town of Yenice. Its area is 1,381 km^{2}, and its population is 31,080 (2021).

== Composition ==
There are two municipalities in Yenice District:

- Kalkım
- Yenice

There are 76 villages in Yenice District:

- Ahiler
- Akçakoyun
- Akköy
- Alancık
- Araovacık
- Armutcuk
- Aşağıçavuş
- Aşağıinova
- Aşağıkaraaşık
- Bağlı
- Ballıçay
- Başkoz
- Bayatlar
- Bekten
- Boynanlar
- Cambaz
- Çakır
- Çakıroba
- Çal
- Çamoba
- Çınarcık
- Çınarköy
- Çırpılar
- Çiftlik
- Çukuroba
- Darıalan
- Davutköy
- Engeci
- Gümüşler
- Gündoğdu
- Güzeloba
- Hacılar
- Hacıyusuflar
- Hamdibey
- Haydaroba
- Hıdırlar
- Kabalı
- Kalabakbaşı
- Karaaydın
- Karabey
- Karadoru
- Karaköy
- Karasu
- Kargacı
- Kırıklar
- Kızıldam
- Koruköy
- Kovancı
- Kurtlar
- Kuzupınarı
- Namazgah
- Nevruz
- Oğlanalanı
- Öğmen
- Örencik
- Pazarköy
- Reşadiye
- Sameteli
- Sarıçayır
- Sazak
- Seyvan
- Sofular
- Soğucak
- Suuçtu
- Taban
- Torhasan
- Üçkabaağaç
- Umurlar
- Yağdıran
- Yalıoba
- Yarış
- Yeniköy
- Yeşilköy
- Yukarıçavuş
- Yukarıinova
- Yukarıkaraaşık
