= Karaköy, Yenice =

Village in Turkey

Karaköy
- Village
- Country: Turkey
- Province: Çanakkale
- District: Yenice
- Population (2021): 479
- Time zone: UTC+3 (TRT)

Karaköy is a village in the Yenice District of Çanakkale Province in Turkey. Its population is 479 (2021).
