= Bayatlar, Yenice =

Village in Turkey

Bayatlar
- Village
- Location in Turkey Bayatlar (Marmara)
- Coordinates: 39°50′25″N 27°19′16″E
- Country: Turkey
- Province: Çanakkale
- District: Yenice
- Population (2021): 193
- Time zone: UTC+3 (TRT)

Bayatlar is a village in the Yenice District of Çanakkale Province in Turkey. Its population is 193 (2021).
