= Karasu, Yenice =

Village in Turkey

Karasu
- Village
- Country: Turkey
- Province: Çanakkale
- District: Yenice
- Population (2021): 125
- Time zone: UTC+3 (TRT)

Karasu is a village in the Yenice District of Çanakkale Province in Turkey. As of 2021 its population was 125.
