= Aşağıkaraaşık, Yenice =

Village in Turkey

Aşağıkaraaşık
- Village
- Location in Turkey Aşağıkaraaşık (Marmara)
- Coordinates: 39°59′N 27°12′E
- Country: Turkey
- Province: Çanakkale
- District: Yenice
- Population (2021): 112
- Time zone: UTC+3 (TRT)

Aşağıkaraaşık is a village in the Yenice District of Çanakkale Province in Turkey. Its population is 112 (2021).
