= Çınarköy, Yenice =

Village in Turkey

Çınarköy
- Village
- Location in Turkey Çınarköy (Marmara)
- Coordinates: 39.873889°N 27.415°E
- Country: Turkey
- Province: Çanakkale
- District: Yenice
- Population (2021): 215
- Time zone: UTC+3 (TRT)

Çınarköy (also: Çınar) is a village in the Yenice District of Çanakkale Province in Turkey. Its population is 215 (2021).
