= Bozkır, Çankırı =

Village in Turkey

Bozkır
- Village
- Location in Turkey Bozkır (Turkey Central Anatolia)
- Coordinates: 40.4444°N 33.8518°E
- Country: Turkey
- Province: Çankırı
- District: Çankırı
- Population (2021): 132
- Time zone: UTC+3 (TRT)

Bozkır is a village in the Çankırı District of Çankırı Province in Turkey. Its population is 132 (2021).
