= Yalıoba, Yenice =

Village in Turkey

Yalıoba
- Village
- Location in Turkey Yalıoba (Marmara)
- Coordinates: 39°58′N 27°28′E
- Country: Turkey
- Province: Çanakkale
- District: Yenice
- Population (2021): 35
- Time zone: UTC+3 (TRT)

Yalıoba is a village in the Yenice District of Çanakkale Province in Turkey. Its population is 35 (2021).
