= Merzi, Çankırı =

Village in Turkey

Merzi
- Village
- Location in Turkey Merzi (Turkey Central Anatolia)
- Coordinates: 40°44′N 33°37′E
- Country: Turkey
- Province: Çankırı
- District: Çankırı
- Population (2021): 54
- Time zone: UTC+3 (TRT)

Merzi is a village in the Çankırı District of Çankırı Province in Turkey. Its population is 54 (2021).
