= Kuzupınarı, Yenice =

Village in Turkey

Kuzupınarı
- Village
- Country: Turkey
- Province: Çanakkale
- District: Yenice
- Population (2021): 189
- Time zone: UTC+3 (TRT)

Kuzupınarı is a village in the Yenice District of Çanakkale Province in Turkey. Its population is 189 (2021).
