= Ovacık, Çankırı =

Village in Turkey

Ovacık
- Village
- Country: Turkey
- Province: Çankırı
- District: Çankırı
- Population (2021): 434
- Time zone: UTC+3 (TRT)

Ovacık is a Turkish village in the Çankırı District of Çankırı Province. Its population is 434 (2021).
