= Örencik, Yenice =

Village in Turkey

Örencik
- Village
- Country: Turkey
- Province: Çanakkale
- District: Yenice
- Population (2021): 213
- Time zone: UTC+3 (TRT)

Örencik is a village in the Yenice District of Çanakkale Province in Turkey. Its population is 213 (2021).
