= Yağdıran, Yenice =

Village in Turkey

Yağdıran
- Village
- Location in Turkey Yağdıran (Marmara)
- Coordinates: 39°44′N 27°21′E
- Country: Turkey
- Province: Çanakkale
- District: Yenice
- Population (2021): 208
- Time zone: UTC+3 (TRT)

Yağdıran is a village in the Yenice District of Çanakkale Province in Turkey. Its population is 208 (2021).
