= Soğucak, Yenice =

Village in Turkey

Soğucak
- Village
- Location in Turkey Soğucak (Marmara)
- Coordinates: 40.0080°N 27.3711°E
- Country: Turkey
- Province: Çanakkale
- District: Yenice
- Population (2021): 237
- Time zone: UTC+3 (TRT)

Soğucak is a village in the Yenice District of Çanakkale Province in Turkey. Its population is 237 (2021).
