= Bayındır, Çankırı =

Village in Turkey

Bayındır
- Village
- Location in Turkey Bayındır (Turkey Central Anatolia)
- Coordinates: 40°37′9″N 33°48′52″E
- Country: Turkey
- Province: Çankırı
- District: Çankırı
- Population (2021): 177
- Time zone: UTC+3 (TRT)

Bayındır is a village in the Çankırı District of Çankırı Province in Turkey. Its population is 177 (2021).
