= Araovacık, Yenice =

Village in Turkey

Araovacık
- Village
- Location in Turkey Araovacık (Marmara)
- Coordinates: 39°54′N 27°29′E
- Country: Turkey
- Province: Çanakkale
- District: Yenice
- Population (2021): 637
- Time zone: UTC+3 (TRT)

Araovacık is a village in the Yenice District of Çanakkale Province in Turkey. Its population is 637 (2021).
