= Çankırı District =

District of Çankırı Province, Turkey

- District
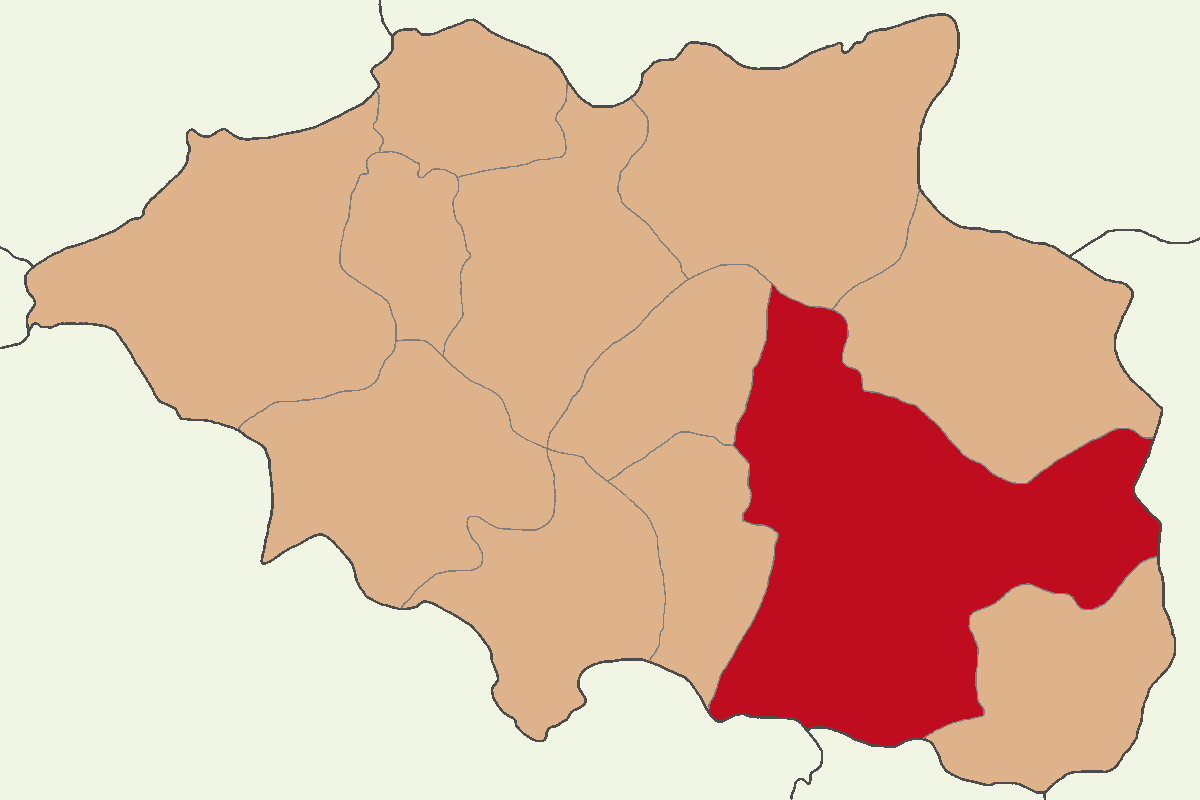
- Map showing Çankırı District in Çankırı Province

- Location in Turkey Çankırı District (Turkey Central Anatolia)
- Coordinates: 40°36′N 33°37′E
- Country: Turkey
- Province: Çankırı
- Seat: Çankırı
- Area: 1,440 km^{2} (560 sq mi)
- Population (2021): 100,027
  - Density: 69/km^{2} (180/sq mi)
- Time zone: UTC+3 (TRT)

Çankırı District (also: Merkez, meaning "central") is a district of the Çankırı Province of Turkey. Its seat is the city of Çankırı. Its area is 1,440 km^{2}, and its population is 100,027 (2021).

== Composition ==
There is one municipality in Çankırı District:

- Çankırı

There are 50 villages in Çankırı District:

- Ağzıbüyük
- Ahlat
- Akçavakıf
- Akören
- Alaçat
- Alıca
- Altınlı
- Aşağıçavuş
- Aşağıpelitözü
- Aşağıyanlar
- Ayan
- Balıbağı
- Başeğmez
- Bayındır
- Beştut
- Bozkır
- Çağabey
- Çatalelma
- Çayırpınar
- Çırçır
- Çiviköy
- Danabaşı
- Dedeköy
- Değim
- Doğantepe
- Dutağaç
- Germece
- Handırı
- Hasakça
- Hıdırlık
- İçyenice
- İnaç
- İnandık
- İncik
- Karadayı
- Karaşeyh
- Kuzuköy
- Küçüklü
- Merzi
- Ovacık
- Paşaköy
- Pehlivanlı
- Satıyüzü
- Süleymanlı
- Taytak
- Tüney
- Tuzlu
- Ünür
- Yukarıçavuş
- Yukarıpelitözü
