= Ünür, Çankırı =

Village in Turkey

Ünür
- Village
- Location in Turkey Ünür (Turkey Central Anatolia)
- Coordinates: 40°35′24″N 34°0′35″E
- Country: Turkey
- Province: Çankırı
- District: Çankırı
- Population (2021): 843
- Time zone: UTC+3 (TRT)

Ünür is a village in the Çankırı District of Çankırı Province in Turkey. Its population is 843 (2021). Before the 2013 reorganisation, it was a town (belde).
