= 1953 Concepción earthquake =

Earthquake in south-central Chile

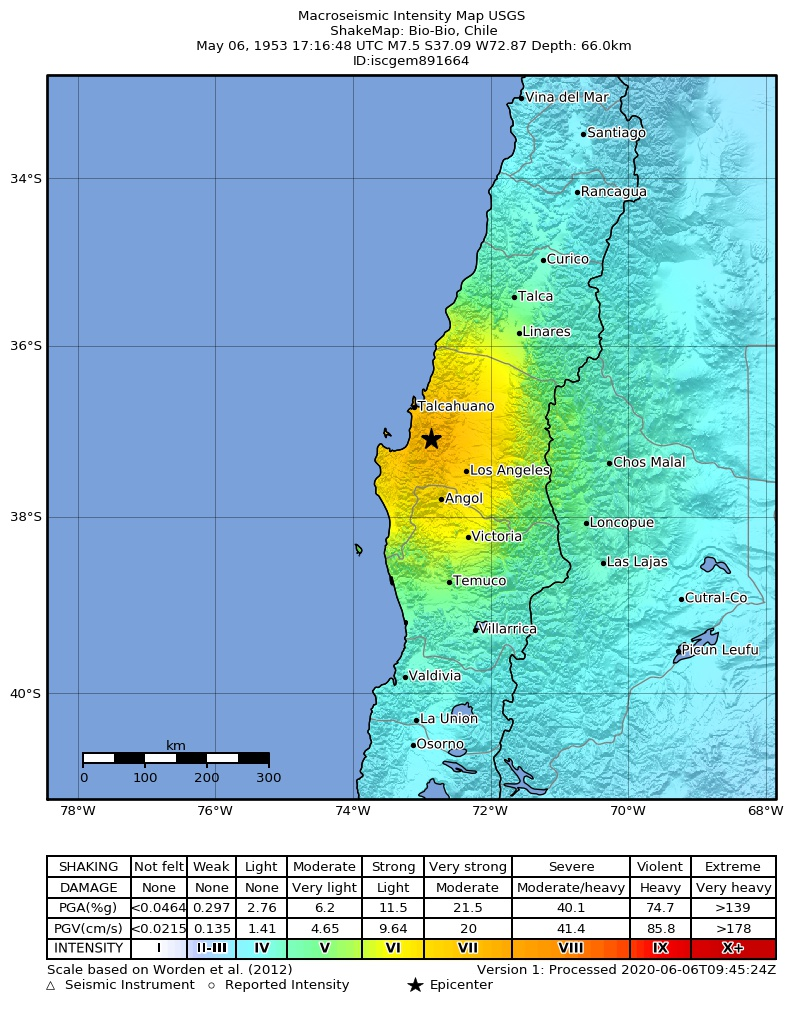

- Location within South America
- UTC time: 1953-05-06 17:16:48
- ISC event: 891664
- USGS-ANSS: ComCat
- Local date: May 6, 1953
- Local time: 13:16:48
- Magnitude: M_{s} 7.6
- Depth: 64 km (40 mi)
- Epicenter: 36.5°S 72.6°W
- Areas affected: Chile
- Casualties: 12

The 1953 Concepción earthquake occurred on May 6 at 17:16 UTC (13:16 local time). The epicenter was located offshore Biobío Region, Chile. It had a magnitude of M_{s} 7.6, or M_{L} 7.6. Twelve people were reported dead in this earthquake.

In Concepción, 15% of the buildings were damaged. Electricity and gas were not affected. However, the electricity service was suspended as a precaution.

In Chillán, the intensity reached MM X. Many houses were destroyed. The electricity, telegraph, and telephone services were interrupted.

In Tomé, several houses were damaged, and many families stayed in the open.

This earthquake was located close to the 1939 Chillán earthquake. However, the focal mechanism of the 1953 Concepción earthquake was reverse faulting, while that of the 1939 Chillán earthquake was normal faulting. It was not clear whether the 1953 Concepción earthquake was an interplate or intraplate earthquake.

== See also ==
- List of earthquakes in 1953
- List of earthquakes in Chile
