= Cambaz, Yenice =

Village in Turkey

Cambaz
- Village
- Location in Turkey Cambaz (Marmara)
- Coordinates: 39°48′N 27°18′E
- Country: Turkey
- Province: Çanakkale
- District: Yenice
- Population (2021): 91
- Time zone: UTC+3 (TRT)

Cambaz is a village in the Yenice District of Çanakkale Province in Turkey. Its population is 91 (2021).
