= Koruköy, Yenice =

Village in Turkey

Koruköy
- Village
- Location in Turkey Koruköy (Marmara)
- Coordinates: 39.8461°N 27.37°E
- Country: Turkey
- Province: Çanakkale
- District: Yenice
- Population (2021): 587
- Time zone: UTC+3 (TRT)

Koruköy is a village in the Yenice District of Çanakkale Province in Turkey. Its population is 587 (2021).
