= Yukarıinova, Yenice =

Village in Turkey

Yukarıinova
- Village
- Location in Turkey Yukarıinova (Marmara)
- Coordinates: 40°05′N 27°16′E
- Country: Turkey
- Province: Çanakkale
- District: Yenice
- Population (2021): 261
- Time zone: UTC+3 (TRT)

Yukarıinova is a village in the Yenice District of Çanakkale Province in Turkey. Its population is 261 (2021).
