= Karadoru, Yenice =

Village in Turkey

Karadoru
- Village
- Location in Turkey Karadoru (Marmara)
- Coordinates: 40°04′N 27°20′E
- Country: Turkey
- Province: Çanakkale
- District: Yenice
- Population (2021): 168
- Time zone: UTC+3 (TRT)

Karadoru is a village in the Yenice District of Çanakkale Province in Turkey. Its population is 168 (2021).
