= Danabaşı, Çankırı =

Village in Turkey

Danabaşı
- Village
- Location in Turkey Danabaşı (Turkey Central Anatolia)
- Coordinates: 40°31′N 34°03′E
- Country: Turkey
- Province: Çankırı
- District: Çankırı
- Population (2021): 80
- Time zone: UTC+3 (TRT)

Danabaşı is a village in the Çankırı District of Çankırı Province in Turkey. Its population is 80 (2021).
