= Çal, Yenice =

Village in Turkey

Çal
- Village
- Location in Turkey Çal (Marmara)
- Coordinates: 39.9797°N 27.1552°E
- Country: Turkey
- Province: Çanakkale
- District: Yenice
- Population (2021): 807
- Time zone: UTC+3 (TRT)

Çal is a village in the Yenice District of Çanakkale Province in Turkey. Its population is 807 (2021).
