= Sofular, Yenice =

Village in Turkey

Sofular
- Village
- Location in Turkey Sofular (Marmara)
- Coordinates: 40.0333°N 27.3002°E
- Country: Turkey
- Province: Çanakkale
- District: Yenice
- Population (2021): 305
- Time zone: UTC+3 (TRT)

Sofular is a village in the Yenice District of Çanakkale Province in Turkey. Its population is 305 (2021).
