= Yukarıkaraaşık, Yenice =

Village in Turkey

Yukarıkaraaşık
- Village
- Location in Turkey Yukarıkaraaşık (Marmara)
- Coordinates: 40°00′N 27°11′E
- Country: Turkey
- Province: Çanakkale
- District: Yenice
- Population (2021): 97
- Time zone: UTC+3 (TRT)

Yukarıkaraaşık is a village in the Yenice District of Çanakkale Province in Turkey. Its population is 97 (2021).
