= Akören, Çankırı =

Village in Turkey

Akören
- Village
- Location in Turkey Akören (Turkey Central Anatolia)
- Coordinates: 40.422°N 33.593°E
- Country: Turkey
- Province: Çankırı
- District: Çankırı
- Population (2021): 139
- Time zone: UTC+3 (TRT)

Akören is a village in the Çankırı District of Çankırı Province in Turkey. Its population is 139 (2021).
