= Reşadiye, Yenice =

Village in Turkey

Reşadiye
- Village
- Country: Turkey
- Province: Çanakkale
- District: Yenice
- Population (2021): 716
- Time zone: UTC+3 (TRT)

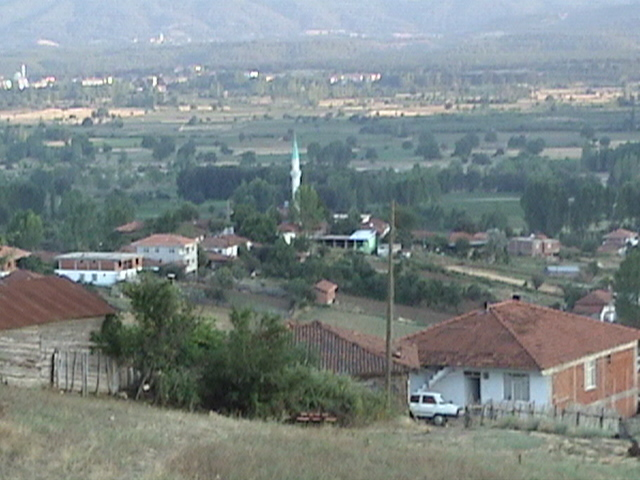
Reşadiye village, Çanakkale, Turkey

Reşadiye is a village in the Yenice District of Çanakkale Province in Turkey. Its population is 716 (2021).
