= Boynanlar, Yenice =

Village in Turkey

Boynanlar
- Village
- Location in Turkey Boynanlar (Marmara)
- Coordinates: 39°49′N 27°23′E
- Country: Turkey
- Province: Çanakkale
- District: Yenice
- Population (2021): 218
- Time zone: UTC+3 (TRT)

Boynanlar is a village in the Yenice District of Çanakkale Province in Turkey. Its population is 218 (2021).
