= Başkoz, Yenice =

Village in Turkey

Başkoz
- Village
- Location in Turkey Başkoz (Marmara)
- Coordinates: 39.8735°N 27.3548°E
- Country: Turkey
- Province: Çanakkale
- District: Yenice
- Population (2021): 141
- Time zone: UTC+3 (TRT)

Başkoz is a village in the Yenice District of Çanakkale Province in Turkey. Its population is 141 (2021).
