= Çamoba, Yenice =

Village in Turkey

Çamoba
- Village
- Location in Turkey Çamoba (Marmara)
- Coordinates: 40.0386°N 27.3922°E
- Country: Turkey
- Province: Çanakkale
- District: Yenice
- Population (2021): 76
- Time zone: UTC+3 (TRT)

Çamoba is a village in the Yenice District of Çanakkale Province in Turkey. Its population is 76 (2021).
