= Taban, Yenice =

Village in Turkey

Taban
- Village
- Location in Turkey Taban (Marmara)
- Coordinates: 40°04′N 27°25′E
- Country: Turkey
- Province: Çanakkale
- District: Yenice
- Population (2021): 425
- Time zone: UTC+3 (TRT)

Taban is a village in the Yenice District of Çanakkale Province in Turkey. Its population is 425 (2021).
