= Karaaydın, Yenice =

Village in Turkey

Karaaydın
- Village
- Location in Turkey Karaaydın (Marmara)
- Coordinates: 39°47′N 27°13′E
- Country: Turkey
- Province: Çanakkale
- District: Yenice
- Population (2021): 308
- Time zone: UTC+3 (TRT)

Karaaydın is a village in the Yenice District of Çanakkale Province in Turkey. Its population is 308 (2021).
