= Kabalı, Yenice =

Village in Turkey

Kabalı
- Village
- Location in Turkey Kabalı (Marmara)
- Coordinates: 39.9258°N 27.46685°E
- Country: Turkey
- Province: Çanakkale
- District: Yenice
- Population (2021): 229
- Time zone: UTC+3 (TRT)

Kabalı is a village in the Yenice District of Çanakkale Province in Turkey. Its population is 229 (2021).
