= Değim, Çankırı =

Village in Turkey

Değim
- Village
- Location in Turkey Değim (Turkey Central Anatolia)
- Coordinates: 40°42′11″N 33°42′12″E
- Country: Turkey
- Province: Çankırı
- District: Çankırı
- Population (2021): 86
- Time zone: UTC+3 (TRT)

Değim is a village in the Çankırı District of Çankırı Province in Turkey. Its population is 86 (2021).
