= Balıbağı, Çankırı =

Village in Turkey

Balıbağı
- Village
- Location in Turkey Balıbağı (Turkey Central Anatolia)
- Coordinates: 40°34′N 33°47′E
- Country: Turkey
- Province: Çankırı
- District: Çankırı
- Population (2021): 338
- Time zone: UTC+3 (TRT)

Balıbağı is a village in the Çankırı District of Çankırı Province in Turkey. Its population is 338 (2021).
