= Engeci, Yenice =

Village in Turkey

Engeci
- Village
- Location in Turkey Engeci (Marmara)
- Coordinates: 39°51′24″N 27°19′20″E
- Country: Turkey
- Province: Çanakkale
- District: Yenice
- Population (2021): 569
- Time zone: UTC+3 (TRT)

Engeci is a village in the Yenice District of Çanakkale Province in Turkey. Its population is 569 (2021).
