= Handırı, Çankırı =

Village in Turkey

Handırı
- Village
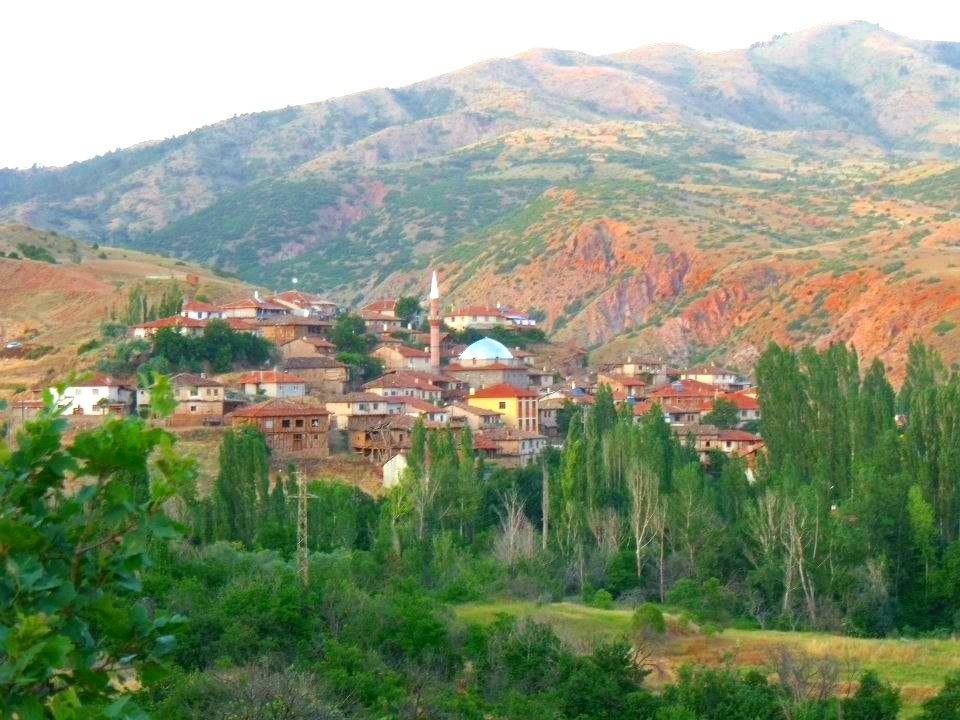

- Location within Turkey Location within Turkey Central Anatolia
- Coordinates: 40°45′N 33°40′E
- Country: Turkey
- Province: Çankırı
- District: Çankırı
- Population (2021): 96
- Time zone: UTC+3 (TRT)

Handırı is a village in the Çankırı District of Çankırı Province in Turkey. Its population is 96 (2021).
