= Ahlat, Çankırı =

Village in Turkey

Ahlat
- Village
- Location in Turkey Ahlat (Turkey Central Anatolia)
- Coordinates: 40.7611°N 33.6129°E
- Country: Turkey
- Province: Çankırı
- District: Çankırı
- Population (2021): 54
- Time zone: UTC+3 (TRT)

Ahlat (also: Ahlatköy) is a village in the Çankırı District of Çankırı Province in Turkey. Its population is 54 (2021).
