= Kalabakbaşı, Yenice =

Village in Turkey

Kalabakbaşı
- Village
- Location in Turkey Kalabakbaşı (Marmara)
- Coordinates: 39°46′N 27°15′E
- Country: Turkey
- Province: Çanakkale
- District: Yenice
- Population (2021): 125
- Time zone: UTC+3 (TRT)

Kalabakbaşı is a village in the Yenice District of Çanakkale Province in Turkey. Its population is 125 (2021).
