= Ballıçay, Yenice =

Village in Turkey

Ballıçay
- Village
- Location in Turkey Ballıçay (Marmara)
- Coordinates: 39°59′53″N 27°23′41″E
- Country: Turkey
- Province: Çanakkale
- District: Yenice
- Population (2021): 209
- Time zone: UTC+3 (TRT)

Ballıçay is a village in the Yenice District of Çanakkale Province in Turkey. Its population is 209 (2021).
