= Alıca, Çankırı =

Village in Turkey

Alıca
- Village
- Location in Turkey Alıca (Turkey Central Anatolia)
- Coordinates: 40.3522°N 33.8378°E
- Country: Turkey
- Province: Çankırı
- District: Çankırı
- Population (2021): 147
- Time zone: UTC+3 (TRT)

Alıca is a village in the Çankırı District of Çankırı Province in Turkey. Its population is 147 (2021).
