= Gündoğdu, Yenice =

Village in Turkey

Gündoğdu
- Village
- Location within Turkey Location within Marmara
- Country: Turkey
- Province: Çanakkale
- District: Yenice
- Population (2021): 322
- Time zone: UTC+3 (TRT)

Gündoğdu is a village in the Yenice District of Çanakkale Province in Turkey. As of 2021, its population was 322.
