= 1953 Tumbes earthquake =

Earthquake affecting Peru and Ecuador

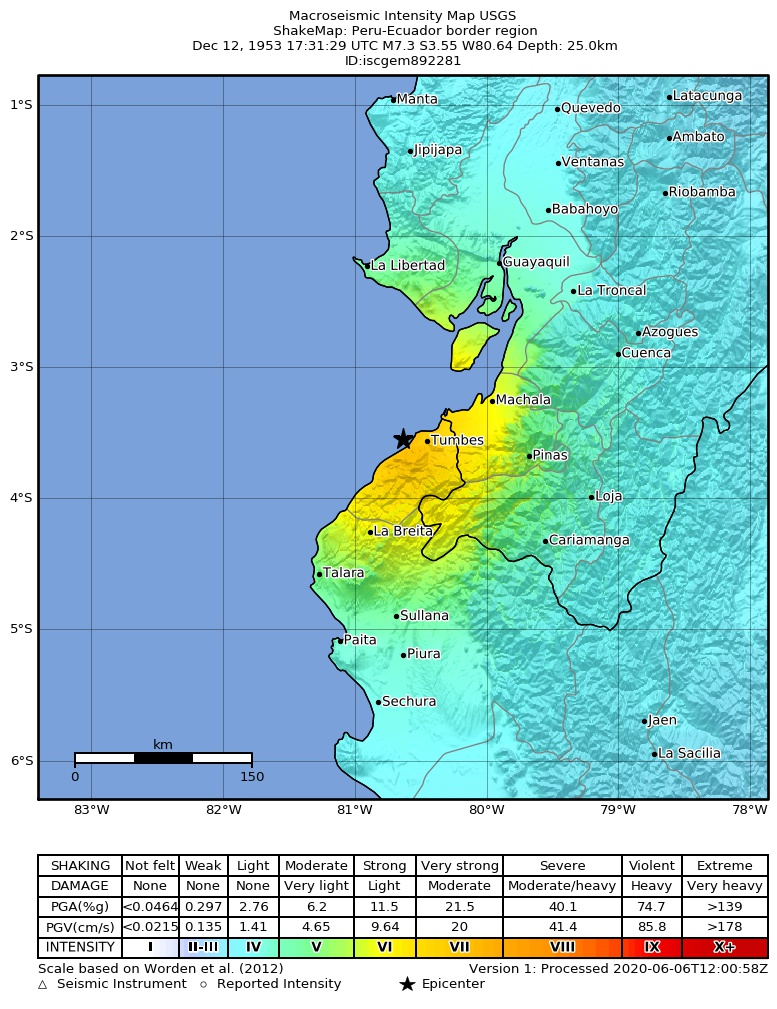

- Location within Peru
- UTC time: 1953-12-12 17:31:29
- ISC event: 892281
- USGS-ANSS: ComCat
- Local date: December 12, 1953
- Local time: 12:31:29
- Magnitude: 7.5 M_{w}
- Depth: 30 km (19 mi)
- Epicenter: 3.4°S 80.6°W
- Areas affected: Peru
- Max. intensity: MMI VIII (Severe)
- Casualties: 6–7 dead 20 injured

The 1953 Tumbes earthquake occurred on December 12 at 12:31:29 local time near the border between Peru and Ecuador. The shock had a moment magnitude of 7.5, a maximum Mercalli Intensity of VIII (Severe), and occurred in the northwestern offshore area of Tumbes, Peru.

== Geology ==
The North Andean convergent margin is a region of large crustal deformation. The North Andes block moves northeastwards relative to the South America at a rate of 6±2 mm/yr. The Nazca plate is subducting beneath the South American plate along the Colombia-Ecuador Trench. The subduction of the Carnegie Ridge into the Colombia-Ecuador Trench affected the crustal deformation in this region and the coupling between the Nazca plate and the South America Plate. In addition, the subduction of the Carnegie Ridge may be an important drive contributing to the relatively northeastward movement of the North Andes block. Although there was no large earthquakes in the Gulf of Guayaquil segment of the subduction zone in the late 20th century, the strong earthquakes in 1953 and 1959 suggested that this was because of the strong coupling rather than being aseismic, and the seismic coupling may be quite high and be able to produce large earthquakes.

Besides subduction, other activities also played important roles in this region. A strike-slip fault known as the Dolores-Guayaquil megashear runs from the trench and goes inland. The Gulf of Guayaquil formed as a result of movement on the Dolores-Guayaquil megashear.

== Damage ==
The earthquake caused six deaths. About 200 buildings were destroyed in Tumbes, Peru. Strong shaking could be felt in northeastern Peru and part of Ecuador. The intensity reached MM VIII in Corrales, Tumbes. In Guayaquil, Ecuador, the intensity was MM VI–VII. There were ground fissures in moist soils. Ejection of mud was reported in Bocapan and Puerto Pizzaro.

== Tsunami ==
A tsunami of ~0.2m was triggered near Salinas.

== Risk assessment ==
Guayaquil, the most populated city of Ecuador, is close to significant seismogenetic structures. The commercial center of Guayaquil is established on alluvial clay deposits interbedded with silty and clayey sand sediments, and the southwestern and southern part of Guayaquil directly lies on lands reclaimed from marshland. Large historical earthquakes, including the earthquake of 1953, showed the importance of the assessment of ground effects caused by earthquakes in Guayaquil. A new INQUA Intensity Scale has been proposed to be applied in such assessment.

== See also ==
- List of earthquakes in 1953
- List of earthquakes in Peru
