= Altınlı, Çankırı =

Village in Turkey

Altınlı
- Village
- Location in Turkey Altınlı (Turkey Central Anatolia)
- Coordinates: 40.5416°N 33.9652°E
- Country: Turkey
- Province: Çankırı
- District: Çankırı
- Population (2021): 50
- Time zone: UTC+3 (TRT)

Altınlı is a village in the Çankırı District of Çankırı Province in Turkey. Its population is 50 (2021).
