= Sarıçayır, Yenice =

Village in Turkey

Sarıçayır
- Village
- Location in Turkey Sarıçayır (Marmara)
- Coordinates: 40.05111°N 27.38083°E
- Country: Turkey
- Province: Çanakkale
- District: Yenice
- Population (2021): 266
- Time zone: UTC+3 (TRT)

Sarıçayır is a village in the Yenice District of Çanakkale Province in Turkey. Its population is 266 (2021).
