= Satıyüzü, Çankırı =

Village in Turkey

Satıyüzü
- Village
- Location in Turkey Satıyüzü (Turkey Central Anatolia)
- Coordinates: 40°35′N 34°05′E
- Country: Turkey
- Province: Çankırı
- District: Çankırı
- Population (2021): 166
- Time zone: UTC+3 (TRT)

Satıyüzü is a village in the Çankırı District of Çankırı Province in Turkey. Its population is 166 (2021).
