= Torhasan, Yenice =

Village in Turkey

Torhasan
- Village
- Location in Turkey Torhasan (Marmara)
- Coordinates: 40°01′N 27°14′E
- Country: Turkey
- Province: Çanakkale
- District: Yenice
- Population (2021): 314
- Time zone: UTC+3 (TRT)

Torhasan is a village in the Yenice District of Çanakkale Province in Turkey. Its population is 314 (2021).
