= Yenice, Çanakkale =

Yenice
- Municipality
- Location in Turkey Yenice (Marmara)
- Coordinates: 39°55′51″N 27°15′29″E
- Country: Turkey
- Province: Çanakkale
- District: Yenice

Government
  - Mayor: Veysel Acar (AK Party)
- Elevation: 255 m (837 ft)
- Population (2021): 8,346
- Time zone: UTC+3 (TRT)
- Postal code: 17550
- Area code: 0286
- Website: www.yenicebelediyesi.bel.tr

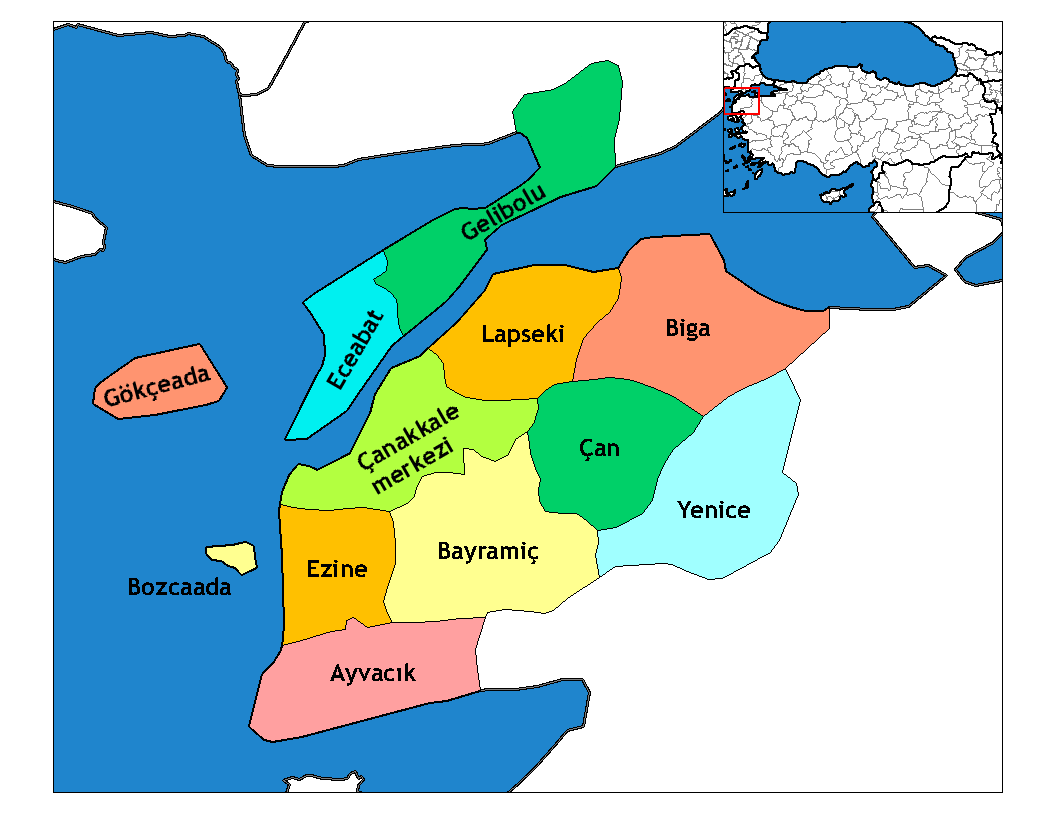
Map of the Canakkale province with Yenice in light blue.

Yenice (Turkish: [jeˈnidʒe]) is a town in Çanakkale Province in the Marmara region of Turkey. It is the seat of Yenice District. Its population is 8,346 (2021). The town lies at an elevation of 255 m (837 ft).

== History ==
On 18 March 1953 Yenice was subject to a M7.4 earthquake which left 998 dead and thousands of buildings damaged. A previous devastating earthquake had occurred here in 1440 AD.

== Economy ==
People's basic occupation is agricultural work. Cereals, beans, tomatoes and tobacco are grown. There is a tomato paste processing plant in Yenice. Important towns in the district include: Kalkım, Hamdibey and Pazarköy.

Tourism is a relatively new component of Yenice's economy; however, wild boar hunting is becoming popular as a tourist attraction.

== Notable people from Yenice ==
- İbrahim Bodur, entrepreneur
- Nuri Bilge Ceylan, film director
