= Kargacı, Yenice =

Village in Turkey

Kargacı
- Village
- Country: Turkey
- Province: Çanakkale
- District: Yenice
- Population (2021): 79
- Time zone: UTC+3 (TRT)

Kargacı is a village in the Yenice District of Çanakkale Province in Turkey. Its population is 79 (2021).
