= Namazgah, Yenice =

Village in Turkey

Namazgah
- Village
- Location in Turkey Namazgah (Marmara)
- Coordinates: 39°53′22″N 27°17′17″E
- Country: Turkey
- Province: Çanakkale
- District: Yenice
- Population (2021): 29
- Time zone: UTC+3 (TRT)

Namazgah is a village in the Yenice District of Çanakkale Province in Turkey. Its population is 29 (2021).
