= Haydaroba, Yenice =

Village in Turkey

Haydaroba
- Village
- Location in Turkey Haydaroba (Marmara)
- Coordinates: 39°53′33″N 27°24′51″E
- Country: Turkey
- Province: Çanakkale
- District: Yenice
- Population (2021): 564
- Time zone: UTC+3 (TRT)

Haydaroba is a village in the Yenice District of Çanakkale Province in Turkey. Its population is 564 (2021).
