= Hamdibey =

- Village
- Location within Turkey Location within Marmara
- Coordinates: 39°51′N 27°15′E
- Country: Turkey
- Province: Çanakkale
- District: Yenice
- Elevation: 255 m (837 ft)
- Population (2021): 460
- Time zone: UTC+3 (TRT)
- Postal code: 17570
- Area code: 0286

Hamdibey is a village in Yenice District of Çanakkale Province, Turkey. Its population is 460 (2021). Before the 2013 reorganisation, it was a town (belde).

== Geography ==
Hamdibey is situated to the south of Sakar Mountains and to the south west of Hamdibey artificial pond. Agonya (Gönen) creek is to the south of Hamdibey. The distance to Yenice is 31 kilometres (19 mi) and to Çanakkale is 114 kilometres (71 mi).

== History ==
The settlement was founded in the early 18th century by a Turkmen tribe under the leadership of a certain Karaahmet. The earlier name of the settlement was Koyuneli ("sheep country"). Koyuneli actively participated in the Turkish War of Independence between 1919 and 1922 . One of the local leaders of Kuvai Milliye (Turkish National Movement) was Hamdi Bey, a governor who was arrested and killed by Ahmet Anzavur a gendarme officier loyal to sultan. During the republican years, the settlement was named after him.

== Economy ==
Most important agricultural products of the town are paprika and tobacco. Dairying is another important economic sector.
