= Pazarköy, Yenice =

Pazarköy
- Village
- Location within Turkey Location within Marmara
- Coordinates: 39°51′N 27°24′E
- Country: Turkey
- Province: Çanakkale
- District: Yenice
- Elevation: 175 m (574 ft)
- Population (2021): 1,340
- Time zone: UTC+3 (TRT)
- Postal code: 17550
- Area code: 0286

Pazarköy (literally “market village”) is a village in Yenice District of Çanakkale Province, Turkey. Its population is 1,340 (2021). It was initially founded by the ancient Greeks and was called Argyria (Αργυρία). Pazarköy is situated to the east of Gönen Creek and the north of the Kaz Mountains (Ida Mountains of antiquity). The distance to Yenice is 37 kilometres (23 mi) and to Çanakkale is 142 kilometres (88 mi) The town was refounded by two Turkmen tribes named İnallı and Hacılı. Between 1973 and the 2013 reorganisation, it was a town (belde). The main agricultural product is paprika.
