= Alancık, Yenice =

Village in Turkey

Alancık
- Village
- Location in Turkey Alancık (Marmara)
- Coordinates: 39.783°N 27.423°E
- Country: Turkey
- Province: Çanakkale
- District: Yenice
- Population (2021): 196
- Time zone: UTC+3 (TRT)

Alancık is a village in the Yenice District of Çanakkale Province in Turkey. Its population is 196 (2021).
