= Bağlı, Yenice =

Village in Turkey

Bağlı
- Village
- Location in Turkey Bağlı (Marmara)
- Coordinates: 39.8013°N 27.2514°E
- Country: Turkey
- Province: Çanakkale
- District: Yenice
- Population (2021): 149
- Time zone: UTC+3 (TRT)

Bağlı is a village in the Yenice District of Çanakkale Province in Turkey. Its population is 149 (2021).
