= Nevruz, Yenice =

Village in Turkey

Nevruz
- Village
- Location in Turkey Nevruz (Marmara)
- Coordinates: 39.952222°N 27.270833°E
- Country: Turkey
- Province: Çanakkale
- District: Yenice
- Population (2021): 291
- Time zone: UTC+3 (TRT)

Nevruz is a village in the Yenice District of Çanakkale Province in Turkey. Its population is 291 (2021).
