= 1953 Yenice–Gönen earthquake =

Earthquake in the Marmara region, Turkey

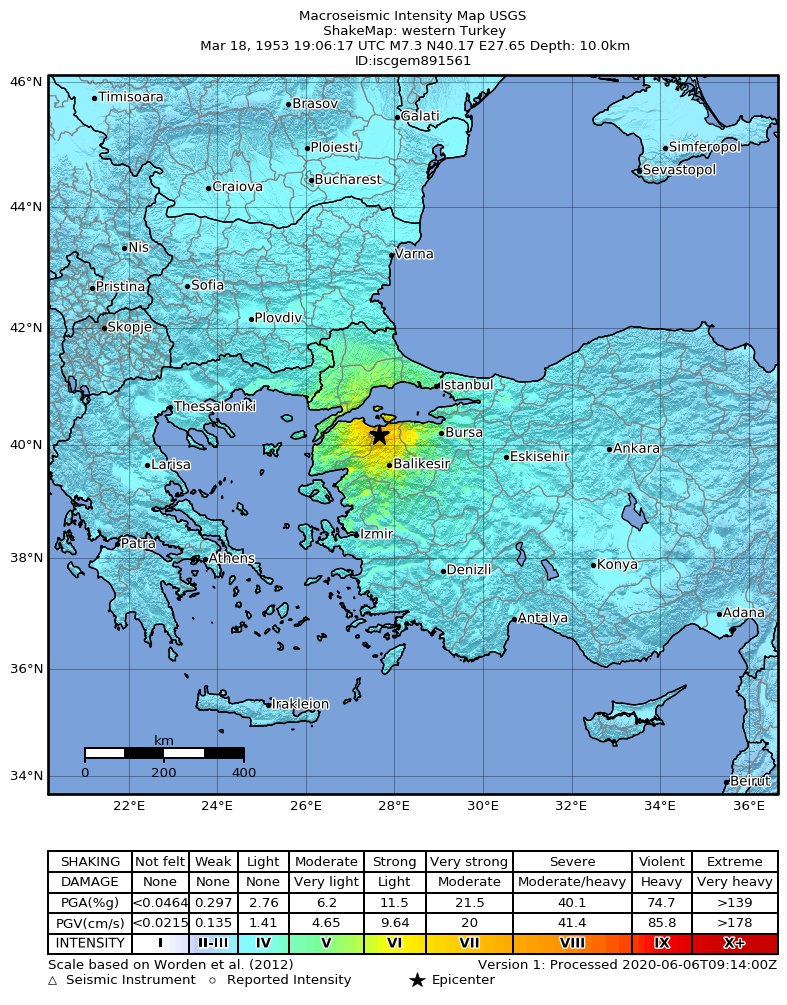

- Location within Turkey
- UTC time: 1953-03-18 19:06:17
- ISC event: 891561
- USGS-ANSS: ComCat
- Local date: 18 March 1953
- Local time: 21:06:17
- Magnitude: 7.5 M_{s}
- Epicenter: 40.02°N 27.53°E
- Areas affected: Turkey Yenice, Çanakkale, Gönen
- Total damage: $3.57 million
- Max. intensity: MMI IX (Violent)
- Casualties: at least 1,070 dead

Tectonic map of the Anatolian Plate showing the main fault zones. The Yenice–Gönen Fault is the southernmost splay at the western end of the North Anatolian Fault

The 1953 Yenice–Gönen earthquake occurred at 21:06 local time (19:06 UTC) on 18 March in the province of Çanakkale and Balıkesir in the Marmara region at western Turkey. It had a surface-wave magnitude of 7.5 and a maximum felt intensity of IX (Violent) on the Mercalli intensity scale. It caused widespread damage, killing 1,070 and causing damage that was estimated at US$3,570,000 repair value.

== Tectonic setting ==
The tectonics of northern and eastern Turkey are dominated by the two strike-slip fault zones that accommodate the west to southwestward movement of the Anatolian Plate relative to the Eurasian plate and the Arabian plate as it is effectively being squeezed out by convergence between them. The quake occurred along the Yenice–Gönen Fault, which is a southern extension of the North Anatolian Fault Zone.

== Damage and casualties ==
The quake had a surface-wave magnitude of 7.5 and it killed at least 1,070; 998 of those deaths were in Yenice, with another 50 in Gönen, 20 in Çan, and 3 in Manyas. The cost of repair was estimated at US$3,570,000. Several thousand buildings were affected in the Can-Yenice-Gonen area. Damage of intensity VI occurred at Sakarya (Adapazarı), Bursa, Edirne, Istanbul and İzmir. The quake was felt throughout the Aegean Islands and in much of mainland Greece, with damage occurring as far away as Crete. Shaking was also recorded in Bulgaria.

Although officials predicted the earthquake would cause only 265 deaths, it multiplied with a death toll seven times the number as expected.

== Characteristics ==
Approximately 70 km (43 mi) of surface faulting occurred, with as much as 4.3 m (14 ft) of strike-slip (horizontal) faulting was observed by geologists east of Yenice.

== Aftermath ==
The damage caused by this earthquake led to a new national reconstruction law in Turkey. In Greece the damage was severe enough that new building codes were introduced.

== Future seismic hazard ==
Trenching and other fieldwork along the trace of the Yenice–Gönen Fault has identified three earthquakes before the 1953 event, about 1440 AD, between 620 and 1270 AD, and another event of uncertain age. These past events give a mean recurrence interval for large earthquakes of 660±160 years. This indicates that there is no significant current threat from ruptures along this fault zone.

== See also ==
- List of earthquakes in 1953
- List of earthquakes in Turkey
