= Akçavakıf, Çankırı =

Village in Turkey

Akçavakıf
- Village
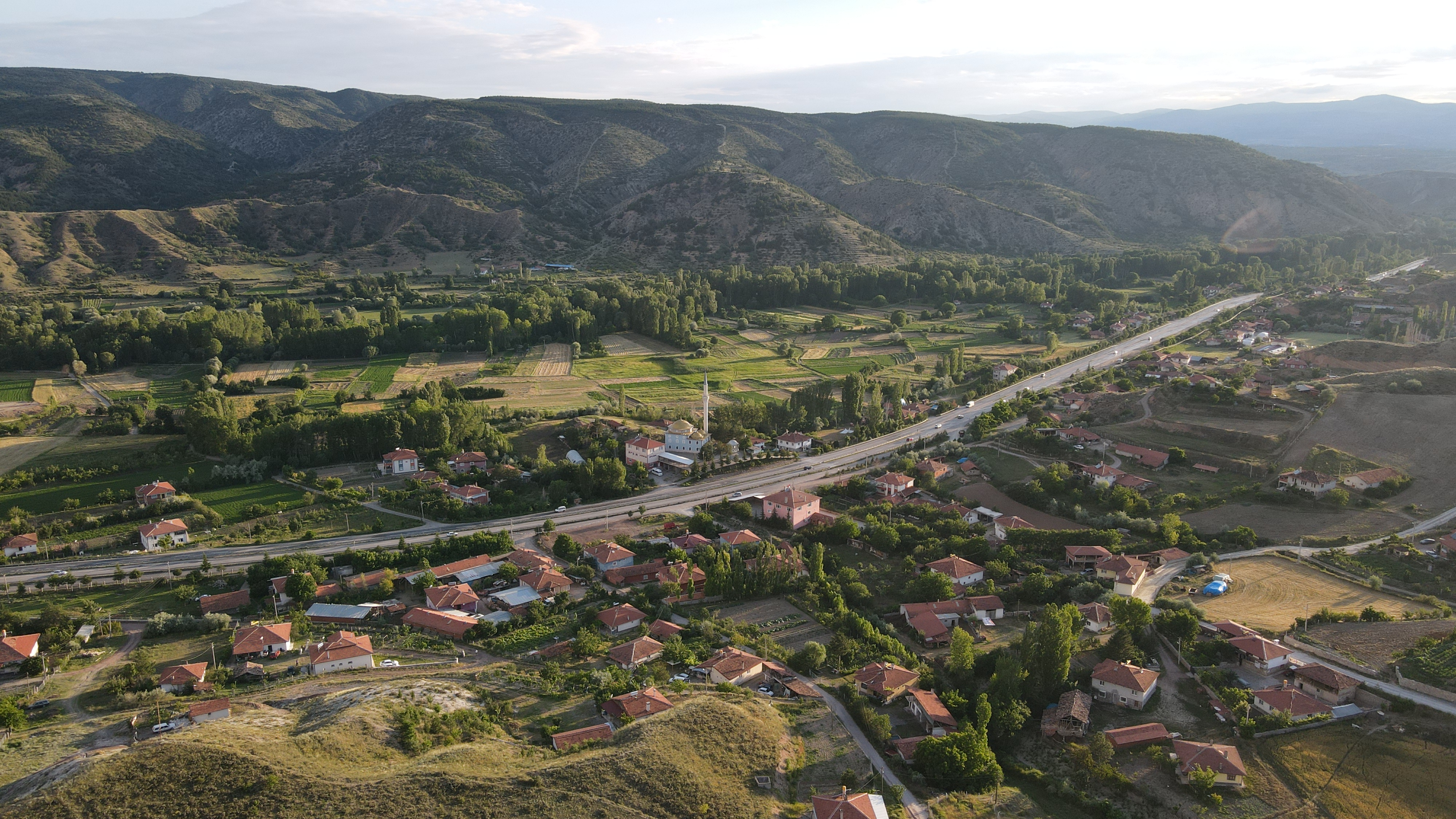

- Location within Turkey Location within Turkey Central Anatolia
- Coordinates: 40°42′N 33°34′E
- Country: Turkey
- Province: Çankırı
- District: Çankırı
- Population (2021): 334
- Time zone: UTC+3 (TRT)

Akçavakıf is a village in the Çankırı District of Çankırı Province in Turkey. Its population is 334 (2021).
