= Akköy, Yenice =

Village in Turkey

Akköy
- Village
- Location in Turkey Akköy (Marmara)
- Coordinates: 39.8009°N 27.1689°E
- Country: Turkey
- Province: Çanakkale
- District: Yenice
- Population (2021): 186
- Time zone: UTC+3 (TRT)

Akköy is a village in the Yenice District of Çanakkale Province in Turkey. Its population is 186 (2021).
