= Suuçtu, Yenice =

Village in Turkey

Suuçtu
- Village
- Location in Turkey Suuçtu (Marmara)
- Coordinates: 39°47′39″N 27°22′00″E
- Country: Turkey
- Province: Çanakkale
- District: Yenice
- Population (2021): 132
- Time zone: UTC+3 (TRT)

Suuçtu is a village in the Yenice District of Çanakkale Province in Turkey. Its population is 132 (2021).
