= İçyenice, Çankırı =

Village in Turkey

İçyenice
- Village
- Location in Turkey İçyenice (Turkey Central Anatolia)
- Coordinates: 40°39′N 33°35′E
- Country: Turkey
- Province: Çankırı
- District: Çankırı
- Population (2021): 179
- Time zone: UTC+3 (TRT)

İçyenice is a village in the Çankırı District of Çankırı Province in Turkey. Its population is 179 (2021).
