= List of earthquakes in 1953 =

Earthquakes in 1953
Approximate epicenters of the earthquakes in 1953
- 4.0–5.9 magnitude
- 6.0–6.9 magnitude
- 7.0–7.9 magnitude
- 8.0+ magnitude
- Strongest magnitude: Japan, off the east coast of Honshu (Magnitude 7.9) November 25
- Deadliest: Turkey, Balıkesir Province (Magnitude 7.3) March 18, 1,070 deaths
- Total fatalities: 2,621

Number by magnitude
- 9.0+: 0

This is a list of earthquakes in 1953. Only magnitude 6.0 or greater earthquakes appear on the list. Lower magnitude events are included if they have caused death, injury or damage. Events which occurred in remote areas will be excluded from the list as they wouldn't have generated significant media interest. All dates are listed according to UTC time. This was a fairly active year. There were no great quakes above magnitude 8.0+ as experienced in previous years. Magnitude 7.0+ quakes numbered 11 in all. Japan led the way in magnitude terms. Other large quakes struck Chile, New Zealand, Papua New Guinea and Turkey. The quakes with the most human casualties were in Turkey, Iran and Greece with the vast majority of the death toll coming from these events.

== Overall ==
=== By death toll ===
Rank	Death toll	Magnitude	Location	MMI	Depth (km)	Date
1	1,070	7.3	Turkey, Balıkesir Province	VIII (Severe)	10.0	March 18
2	970	6.6	Iran, Semnan Province	VII (Very strong)	15.0	February 12
3	476	6.8	Greece, just east of Cephalonia	X (Extreme)	10.0	August 12
4	40	6.3	United Kingdom, off the west coast of Paphos, Cyprus	X (Extreme)	20.0	September 10
5	37	5.5	Turkey, Edirne Province	V (Moderate)	35.0	June 18

- Note: At least 10 casualties

=== By magnitude ===
Rank	Magnitude	Death toll	Location	MMI	Depth (km)	Date
1	7.9	1	Japan, off the southeast coast of Honshu	V (Moderate)	25.0	November 25
2	7.5	9	Chile, Biobio Region	X (Extreme)	66.0	May 6
= 3	7.4	0	Australia, southern New Ireland, Papua and New Guinea	VII (Very strong)	35.0	April 23
= 3	7.4	3	Chile, Antofagasta Region	( )	106.0	December 7
= 4	7.3	1,070	Turkey, Balıkesir Province	VIII (Severe)	10.0	March 18
= 4	7.3	0	United Kingdom, west of Saint Lucia	VII (Very strong)	128.8	March 19
= 4	7.3	6	Peru, off the coast of Tumbes Region	IX (Violent)	25.0	December 12
5	7.2	0	New Hebrides, Vanuatu	V (Moderate)	236.2	July 2
6	7.1	0	New Hebrides, Vanuatu	VI (Strong)	35.0	November 4
= 7	7.0	0	United States, Near Islands, Alaska	( )	21.3	January 5
= 7	7.0	0	New Zealand, Kermadec Islands	( )	350.0	July 4

- Note: At least 7.0 magnitude

== Notable events ==
=== January ===
January
- Strongest magnitude: 7.0 M_{w} United States
- Deadliest: 6.1 M_{w} Haiti; 2 deaths
- Total fatalities: 2

Number by magnitude
- 8.0–8.9: 0
- 7.0–7.9: 1
- 6.0–6.9: 8

Date	Country and location	M_{w}	Depth (km)	MMI	Notes	Casualties	
Date	Country and location	M_{w}	Depth (km)	MMI	Notes	Dead	Injured
5	United States, Near Islands, Alaska	7.0	21.3				
5	Russian Soviet Federative Socialist Republic, Kuril Islands	6.8	49.2				
7	Australia, East New Britain Province, Papua New Guinea	6.4	55.2	VI			
11	Canada, Yukon Territory	6.3	15.0				
12	Russian Soviet Federative Socialist Republic, Kuril Islands	6.6	54.2	V			
19	Japan, south of Hokkaido	6.1	44.2	IV			
20	Indonesia, Molucca Sea	6.5	70.0				
25	Haiti, Nippes	6.1	35.0	VI	2 people were killed and some damage was caused.	2	
30	United Kingdom, Santa Cruz Islands, Solomon Islands	6.5	93.0				

=== February ===
February
- Strongest magnitude: 6.8 M_{w} United Kingdom
- Deadliest: 6.6 M_{w} Iran; 970 deaths
- Total fatalities: 970

Number by magnitude
- 8.0–8.9: 0
- 7.0–7.9: 0
- 6.0–6.9: 5

Date	Country and location	M_{w}	Depth (km)	MMI	Notes	Casualties	
Date	Country and location	M_{w}	Depth (km)	MMI	Notes	Dead	Injured
6	Japan, south of Hokkaido	6.6	45.1	V			
12	Iran, Semnan Province	6.6	15.0	VII	970 people were killed in the 1953 Torud earthquake.	970	
14	Greece, Dodecanese Islands	6.2	80.0				
14	United States, Northern Mariana Islands	6.5	75.0				
26	United Kingdom, Santa Cruz Islands, Solomon Islands	6.8	25.0				

=== March ===
March
- Strongest magnitude: 7.3 M_{w} 2 events
- Deadliest: 7.3 M_{w} Turkey; 1,070 deaths
- Total fatalities: 1,070

Number by magnitude
- 8.0–8.9: 0
- 7.0–7.9: 2
- 6.0–6.9: 5

Date	Country and location	M_{w}	Depth (km)	MMI	Notes	Casualties	
Date	Country and location	M_{w}	Depth (km)	MMI	Notes	Dead	Injured
3	New Hebrides, Vanuatu	6.6	35.0				
4	Argentina, Santiago del Estero Province	6.2	581.3				
5	Russian Soviet Federative Socialist Republic, off the east coast of Kamchatka	6.3	52.0				
5	Russian Soviet Federative Socialist Republic, Kuril Islands	6.5	30.0				
14	Philippines, southern Mindanao	6.3	35.0	VI			
18	Turkey, Balıkesir Province	7.3	10.0	VIII	The 1953 Yenice-Gonen earthquake resulted in 1,070 deaths. Property damage costs were $3.57 million (1953 rate).	1,070	
19	United Kingdom, west of Saint Lucia	7.3	128.8	VII			

=== April ===
April
- Strongest magnitude: 7.4 M_{w} Australia
- Total fatalities: 0

Number by magnitude
- 8.0–8.9: 0
- 7.0–7.9: 1
- 6.0–6.9: 11

Date	Country and location	M_{w}	Depth (km)	MMI	Notes	Casualties	
Date	Country and location	M_{w}	Depth (km)	MMI	Notes	Dead	Injured
1	Ecuador, off the coast	6.1	10.0	rowspan="2"| Doublet earthquake			
1	Ecuador, off the coast	6.2	20.0	VI			
2	Australia, East New Britain Province, Papua and New Guinea	6.2	55.0	V			
4	Japan, off the east coast of Honshu	6.3	28.4	IV			
5	Taiwan, off the east coast	6.0	35.0				
6	Indonesia, Tanimbar Islands	6.3	63.3				
14	Brazil, Acre (state)	6.5	617.6				
17	Peru, Loreto Region	6.1	15.0	VI			
23	China, eastern Xizang Province	6.0	10.0	VII			
23	Australia, southern New Ireland (island), Papua and New Guinea	7.4	35.0	VII	A tsunami was generated. Damage was minor with costs of $13,000 (1953 rate) being reported.		
29	United Kingdom, off the west coast of Guadalcanal, Solomon Islands	6.2	19.0	VI			
30	New Hebrides, Vanuatu	6.6	45.0				

=== May ===
May
- Strongest magnitude: 7.5 M_{w} Chile
- Deadliest: 7.5 M_{w} Chile; 9 deaths
- Total fatalities: 9

Number by magnitude
- 8.0–8.9: 0
- 7.0–7.9: 1
- 6.0–6.9: 3
- 5.0–5.9: 1

Date	Country and location	M_{w}	Depth (km)	MMI	Notes	Casualties	
Date	Country and location	M_{w}	Depth (km)	MMI	Notes	Dead	Injured
3	China, Yunnan Province	5.6	35.0	VII	Some homes were destroyed.		
6	Chile, Biobio Region	7.5	66.0	X	9 people were killed and 26 were injured in the 1953 Concepción earthquake. Major damage was caused with costs reaching $500 million (1953 rate).	9	26
20	Indonesia, Gulf of Tomini	6.7	115.0				
26	Japan, south of Hokkaido	6.2	49.3	V			
31	Dominican Republic, Hermanas Mirabal Province	6.6	16.7	VII			

=== June ===
June
- Strongest magnitude: 6.8 M_{w} Indonesia 2 events
- Deadliest: 5.5 M_{w} Turkey; 37 deaths
- Total fatalities: 37

Number by magnitude
- 8.0–8.9: 0
- 7.0–7.9: 0
- 6.0–6.9: 7
- 5.0–5.9: 1

Date	Country and location	M_{w}	Depth (km)	MMI	Notes	Casualties	
Date	Country and location	M_{w}	Depth (km)	MMI	Notes	Dead	Injured
10	Indonesia, Banda Sea	6.0	50.0	IV			
15	United States, south of Kodiak Island, Alaska	6.5	20.0				
16	Fiji, south of	6.5	113.9				
18	Turkey, Edirne Province	5.5	35.0	V	37 people were killed. Some damage was caused.	37	
18	Australia, southwest of Bougainville Island, Papua and New Guinea	6.2	25.0	VI			
23	Russian Soviet Federative Socialist Republic, southern Kamchatka	6.1	48.4	V			
25	Indonesia, Flores	6.8	25.0	rowspan="2"| Doublet earthquake			
26	Indonesia, Flores	6.8	25.0	VII			

=== July ===
July
- Strongest magnitude: 7.2 M_{w} New Hebrides
- Total fatalities: 0

Number by magnitude
- 8.0–8.9: 0
- 7.0–7.9: 2
- 6.0–6.9: 11

Date	Country and location	M_{w}	Depth (km)	MMI	Notes	Casualties	
Date	Country and location	M_{w}	Depth (km)	MMI	Notes	Dead	Injured
1	Russian Soviet Federative Socialist Republic, northern Kuril Islands	6.5	53.4	VI			
2	New Hebrides, Vanuatu	7.2	236.2	V			
4	New Zealand, Kermadec Islands	7.0	350.0				
6	Australia, off the east coast of mainland Papua and New Guinea	6.1	15.0	VI			
7	Indonesia, northern Sumatra	6.6	238.6				
9	China, southern Xinjiang Province	6.1	10.0	VII			
12	Indonesia, Papua (province)	6.3	28.0	VI			
20	Fiji, south of	6.5	102.7				
21	Japan, Okinawa Island, Ryukyu Islands	6.1	37.3				
22	Russian Soviet Federative Socialist Republic, Kuril Islands	6.4	58.1	VI			
26	United States, Northern Mariana Islands	6.7	190.4				
29	El Salvador, off the coast	6.0	25.0				
31	Chile, Santiago Metropolitan Region	6.0	15.0	VI			

=== August ===
August
- Strongest magnitude: 6.8 M_{w} Greece
- Deadliest: 6.8 M_{w} Greece; 476 deaths
- Total fatalities: 476

Number by magnitude
- 8.0–8.9: 0
- 7.0–7.9: 0
- 6.0–6.9: 11

Date	Country and location	M_{w}	Depth (km)	MMI	Notes	Casualties	
Date	Country and location	M_{w}	Depth (km)	MMI	Notes	Dead	Injured
9	Chile, Antofagasta Region	6.2	117.2				
9	Greece, east of Cephalonia	6.3	15.0	VI	Foreshock.		
11	Greece, east of Cephalonia	6.5	10.0	IX	Foreshock.		
12	Greece, east of Cephalonia	6.8	10.0	X	The 1953 Ionian earthquake was the largest of a series of events which caused major destruction in the area. 476 people were killed and 2,412 were injured. 27,773 homes were destroyed. Property damage costs were $100 million (1953 rate).	476	2,412
12	Greece, north of Zakynthos	6.2	15.0	VII	Aftershock.		
12	Greece, east of Cephalonia	6.0	15.0	VI	Aftershock.		
12	Tonga	6.3	25.0				
13	France, Loyalty Islands, New Caledonia	6.6	111.8				
17	Indonesia, Bali Sea	6.0	35.0	VI			
25	Australia, southeast of New Britain, Papua and New Guinea	6.3	30.0	V			
27	Japan, central Hokkaido	6.0	169.9				

=== September ===
September
- Strongest magnitude: 6.9 M_{w} 2 events
- Deadliest: 6.3 M_{w} United Kingdom; 40 deaths
- Total fatalities: 47

Number by magnitude
- 8.0–8.9: 0
- 7.0–7.9: 0
- 6.0–6.9: 10

Date	Country and location	M_{w}	Depth (km)	MMI	Notes	Casualties	
Date	Country and location	M_{w}	Depth (km)	MMI	Notes	Dead	Injured
4	Russian Soviet Federative Socialist Republic, Kuril Islands	6.9	56.3	VII			
4	Chile, off the coast of Valparaíso Region	6.3	36.6	VI			
5	Russian Soviet Federative Socialist Republic, off the east coast of Kamchatka	6.1	50.7	V			
7	Turkey, Çankırı Province	6.1	10.0	VII			
10	United Kingdom, off the west coast of Paphos, Cyprus	6.3	20.0	X	The 1953 Paphos earthquake killed 40 people and 100 were left injured. 500 homes were destroyed.	40	100
14	Fiji, south of Suva	6.4	10.0	VII	The 1953 Suva earthquake was a rare deadly event in Fiji. This event was near to the capitol which contributed to the destruction. A tsunami was generated which caused much of the 7 deaths and 12 injuries. Some homes were destroyed.	7	12
17	Tonga	6.4	35.0				
23	Russian Soviet Federative Socialist Republic, Kuril Islands	6.6	55.2	V			
29	New Zealand, Bay of Plenty	6.9	310.8				
30	Mexico, far southern Gulf of California	6.8	10.0	V			

=== October ===
October
- Strongest magnitude: 6.9 M_{w} Japan
- Total fatalities: 0

Number by magnitude
- 8.0–8.9: 0
- 7.0–7.9: 0
- 6.0–6.9: 9

Date	Country and location	M_{w}	Depth (km)	MMI	Notes	Casualties	
Date	Country and location	M_{w}	Depth (km)	MMI	Notes	Dead	Injured
5	Australia, D'Entrecasteaux Islands, Papua and New Guinea	6.3	25.0	VI			
6	Australia, Bismarck Sea, Papua and New Guinea	6.6	20.0				
8	China, western Xizang Province	6.1	10.0	VII	Foreshock.		
11	Russian Soviet Federative Socialist Republic, Kuril Islands	6.6	49.8	V			
11	China, western Xizang Province	6.5	30.0	VI			
13	Mexico, northern Gulf of California	6.2	15.0				
14	Japan, Hokkaido	6.9	113.2				
21	Greece, Cephalonia	6.2	15.0	VII	Aftershock of August event.		
27	Bolivia, Potosí Department	6.8	271.9				

=== November ===
November
- Strongest magnitude: 7.9 M_{w} Japan
- Deadliest: 7.9 M_{w} Japan; 1 death
- Total fatalities: 1

Number by magnitude
- 8.0–8.9: 0
- 7.0–7.9: 2
- 6.0–6.9: 11

Date	Country and location	M_{w}	Depth (km)	MMI	Notes	Casualties	
Date	Country and location	M_{w}	Depth (km)	MMI	Notes	Dead	Injured
4	New Hebrides, Vanuatu	7.1	35.0	VI			
7	Indonesia, Batu Islands	6.1	25.0	VI			
9	Russian Soviet Federative Socialist Republic, off the east coast of Kamchatka	6.4	33.3	IV			
10	Russian Soviet Federative Socialist Republic, off the east coast of Kamchatka	6.6	56.7	VI			
13	New Hebrides, Vanuatu	6.6	25.0		Aftershock.		
17	Guatemala, off the southwest coast	6.8	25.0	V			
25	Japan, off the southeast coast of Honshu	7.9	25.0	V	1 person was killed and some damage was reported. A small tsunami was reported which destroyed some boats.	1	
26	Japan, off the southeast coast of Honshu	6.5	25.0		Aftershock.		
26	Japan, off the southeast coast of Honshu	6.7	25.0		Aftershock.		
27	Fiji	6.2	15.0				
29	China, northern Xinjiang Province	6.0	20.0	VII			
30	Fiji	6.0	15.0				

=== December ===
December
- Strongest magnitude: 7.3 M_{w} Peru
- Deadliest: 7.3 M_{w} Peru; 6 deaths
- Total fatalities: 9

Number by magnitude
- 8.0–8.9: 0
- 7.0–7.9: 2
- 6.0–6.9: 10

Date	Country and location	M_{w}	Depth (km)	MMI	Notes	Casualties	
Date	Country and location	M_{w}	Depth (km)	MMI	Notes	Dead	Injured
1	Japan, Ryukyu Islands	6.8	233.4				
1	Mexico, off the coast of Guerrero	6.9	0.0		Unknown depth.		
1	Fiji, south of	6.5	499.4				
2	Australia, Sandaun Province, Papua and New Guinea	6.6	25.0	VII			
3	China, western Xizang Province	6.5	30.0	VII			
7	Chile, Antofagasta Region	7.2	106.0		3 people were killed and damage costs were around $7.3 million (1953 rate).	3	
7	Japan, off the east coast of Honshu	6.2	35.0	IV			
12	Peru, off the coast of Tumbes Region	7.3	25.0	IX	The 1953 Tumbes earthquake resulted in 6 deaths and 20 injuries. 200 homes were destroyed.	6	20
20	Chile, off the coast of Coquimbo Region	6.3	25.0	VI			
22	Philippines, off the west coast of Luzon	6.0	25.0	IV			
24	Russian Soviet Federative Socialist Republic, off the east coast of Kamchatka	6.5	25.0		Foreshock.		
25	Russian Soviet Federative Socialist Republic, off the east coast of Kamchatka	6.8	35.0	V			
