= Bekten, Yenice =

Village in Turkey

Bekten
- Village
- Location in Turkey Bekten (Marmara)
- Coordinates: 40°00′N 27°17′E
- Country: Turkey
- Province: Çanakkale
- District: Yenice
- Population (2021): 233
- Time zone: UTC+3 (TRT)

Bekten is a village in the Yenice District of Çanakkale Province in Turkey. Its population is 233 (2021).
