= Aşağıyanlar, Çankırı =

Village in Turkey

Aşağıyanlar
- Village
- Location in Turkey Aşağıyanlar (Turkey Central Anatolia)
- Coordinates: 40°33′N 33°34′E
- Country: Turkey
- Province: Çankırı
- District: Çankırı
- Population (2021): 257
- Time zone: UTC+3 (TRT)

Aşağıyanlar is a village in the Çankırı District of Çankırı Province in Turkey. Its population is 257 (2021).
