= Armutcuk, Yenice =

Village in Turkey

Armutcuk
- Village
- Location in Turkey Armutcuk (Marmara)
- Coordinates: 39.7134°N 27.2806°E
- Country: Turkey
- Province: Çanakkale
- District: Yenice
- Population (2021): 219
- Time zone: UTC+3 (TRT)

Armutcuk is a village in the Yenice District of Çanakkale Province in Turkey. Its population is 219 (2021).
