= Yukarıpelitözü, Çankırı =

Village in Turkey

Yukarıpelitözü
- Village
- Location in Turkey Yukarıpelitözü (Turkey Central Anatolia)
- Coordinates: 40°28′20″N 33°36′44″E
- Country: Turkey
- Province: Çankırı
- District: Çankırı
- Population (2021): 200
- Time zone: UTC+3 (TRT)

Yukarıpelitözü is a village in the Çankırı District of Çankırı Province in Turkey. Its population is 200 (2021).
