= Güzeloba, Yenice =

Village in Çanakkale Province, Turkey

Güzeloba
- Village
- Country: Turkey
- Province: Çanakkale
- District: Yenice
- Population (2021): 37
- Time zone: UTC+3 (TRT)

Güzeloba is a village in the Yenice District of Çanakkale Province in Turkey. Its population is 37 (2021).
