= Öğmen, Yenice =

Village in Turkey

Öğmen
- Village
- Location in Turkey Öğmen (Marmara)
- Coordinates: 39°46′54″N 27°19′24″E
- Country: Turkey
- Province: Çanakkale
- District: Yenice
- Population (2021): 292
- Time zone: UTC+3 (TRT)

Öğmen is a village in the Yenice District of Çanakkale Province in Turkey. In 2021, its population was recorded to be 292.
