= Başeğmez, Çankırı =

Village in Turkey

Başeğmez
- Village
- Location in Turkey Başeğmez (Turkey Central Anatolia)
- Coordinates: 40.7435°N 33.6438°E
- Country: Turkey
- Province: Çankırı
- District: Çankırı
- Population (2021): 47
- Time zone: UTC+3 (TRT)

Başeğmez is a village in the Çankırı District of Çankırı Province in Turkey.

Its population is 47 (2021).
