= Aşağıpelitözü, Çankırı =

Village in Turkey

Aşağıpelitözü
- Village
- Location in Turkey Aşağıpelitözü (Turkey Central Anatolia)
- Coordinates: 40°28′N 33°39′E
- Country: Turkey
- Province: Çankırı
- District: Çankırı
- Population (2021): 304
- Time zone: UTC+3 (TRT)

Aşağıpelitözü is a village in the Çankırı District of Çankırı Province in Turkey. Its population is 304 (2021).
