= Umurlar, Yenice =

Village in Turkey

Umurlar
- Village
- Location in Turkey Umurlar (Marmara)
- Coordinates: 39.8969°N 27.3491°E
- Country: Turkey
- Province: Çanakkale
- District: Yenice
- Population (2021): 96
- Time zone: UTC+3 (TRT)

Umurlar is a village in the Yenice District of Çanakkale Province in Turkey. Its population is 96 (2021).
