= Karadayı, Çankırı =

Village in Turkey

Karadayı
- Village
- Country: Turkey
- Province: Çankırı
- District: Çankırı
- Population (2021): 528
- Time zone: UTC+3 (TRT)

Karadayı is a village in the Çankırı District of Çankırı Province in Turkey. Its population is 528 (2021).
