= Alaçat, Çankırı =

Village in Turkey

Alaçat
- Village
- Location in Turkey Alaçat (Turkey Central Anatolia)
- Coordinates: 40.5687°N 33.9242°E
- Country: Turkey
- Province: Çankırı
- District: Çankırı
- Population (2021): 239
- Time zone: UTC+3 (TRT)

Alaçat is a village in the Çankırı District of Çankırı Province in Turkey. Its population is 239 (2021).
