= Kırıklar, Yenice =

Village in Turkey

Kırıklar
- Village
- Country: Turkey
- Province: Çanakkale
- District: Yenice
- Population (2021): 131
- Time zone: UTC+3 (TRT)

Kırıklar is a village in the Yenice District of Çanakkale Province in Turkey. Its population is 131 (2021).
