= Çırpılar, Yenice =

Village in Turkey

Çırpılar
- Village
- Country: Turkey
- Province: Çanakkale
- District: Yenice
- Population (2021): 286
- Time zone: UTC+3 (TRT)

Çırpılar is a village in the Yenice District of Çanakkale Province in Turkey. Its population is 286 (2021).
