= Sazak, Yenice =

Village in Turkey

Sazak
- Village
- Location within Turkey Location within Marmara
- Country: Turkey
- Province: Çanakkale
- District: Yenice
- Population (2021): 264
- Time zone: UTC+3 (TRT)

Sazak is a village in the Yenice District of Çanakkale Province in Turkey. Its population is 264 (2021).
