= Aşağıinova, Yenice =

Village in Turkey

Aşağıinova
- Village
- Location in Turkey Aşağıinova (Marmara)
- Coordinates: 40°05′N 27°18′E
- Country: Turkey
- Province: Çanakkale
- District: Yenice
- Population (2021): 145
- Time zone: UTC+3 (TRT)

Aşağıinova is a village in the Yenice District of Çanakkale Province in Turkey. Its population is 145 (2021).
