= Çakıroba, Yenice =

Village in Turkey

Çakıroba
- Village
- Location in Turkey Çakıroba (Marmara)
- Coordinates: 39.955°N 27.2905°E
- Country: Turkey
- Province: Çanakkale
- District: Yenice
- Population (2021): 75
- Time zone: UTC+3 (TRT)

Çakıroba is a village in the Yenice District of Çanakkale Province in Turkey. Its population is 75 (2021).
