= Hacılar, Yenice =

Village in Turkey

Hacılar
- Village
- Location in Turkey Hacılar (Marmara)
- Coordinates: 39.75541°N 27.38070°E
- Country: Turkey
- Province: Çanakkale
- District: Yenice
- Population (2021): 117
- Time zone: UTC+3 (TRT)

Hacılar is a village in the Yenice District of Çanakkale Province in Turkey. Its population is 117 (2021).
