= Hasakça, Çankırı =

Village in Turkey

Hasakça
- Village
- Location in Turkey Hasakça (Turkey Central Anatolia)
- Coordinates: 40°40′N 33°46′E
- Country: Turkey
- Province: Çankırı
- District: Çankırı
- Population (2021): 316
- Time zone: UTC+3 (TRT)

Hasakça is a village in the Çankırı District of Çankırı Province in Turkey. Its population is 316 (2021).
