= Beştut, Çankırı =

Village in Turkey

Beştut
- Village
- Location in Turkey Beştut (Turkey Central Anatolia)
- Coordinates: 40°37′N 34°04′E
- Country: Turkey
- Province: Çankırı
- District: Çankırı
- Population (2021): 305
- Time zone: UTC+3 (TRT)

Beştut (also: Beşdut) is a village in the Çankırı District of Çankırı Province in Turkey. Its population is 305 (2021).
