= Aşağıçavuş, Çankırı =

Village in Turkey

Aşağıçavuş
- Village
- Location in Turkey Aşağıçavuş (Turkey Central Anatolia)
- Coordinates: 40.6866°N 33.6137°E
- Country: Turkey
- Province: Çankırı
- District: Çankırı
- Population (2021): 79
- Time zone: UTC+3 (TRT)

Aşağıçavuş is a village in the Çankırı District of Çankırı Province in Turkey. Its population is 79 (2021).
