= Çakır, Yenice =

Village in Turkey

Çakır
- Village
- Location in Turkey Çakır (Marmara)
- Coordinates: 39.9483°N 27.3363°E
- Country: Turkey
- Province: Çanakkale
- District: Yenice
- Population (2021): 324
- Time zone: UTC+3 (TRT)

Çakır is a village in the Yenice District of Çanakkale Province in Turkey. Its population is 324 (2021).
