= Aşağıçavuş, Yenice =

Village in Turkey

Aşağıçavuş
- Village
- Location in Turkey Aşağıçavuş (Marmara)
- Coordinates: 39.8119°N 27.1085°E
- Country: Turkey
- Province: Çanakkale
- District: Yenice
- Population (2021): 283
- Time zone: UTC+3 (TRT)

Aşağıçavuş is a village in the Yenice District of Çanakkale Province in Turkey. Its population is 283 (2021).
