= İncik, Çankırı =

Village in Turkey

İncik
- Village
- Country: Turkey
- Province: Çankırı
- District: Çankırı
- Population (2021): 36
- Time zone: UTC+3 (TRT)

İncik is a village in the Çankırı District of Çankırı Province in Turkey. Its population is 36 (2021).
