= Ağzıbüyük, Çankırı =

Village in Turkey

Ağzıbüyük
- Village
- Location in Turkey Ağzıbüyük (Turkey Central Anatolia)
- Coordinates: 40.5430°N 34.0196°E
- Country: Turkey
- Province: Çankırı
- District: Çankırı
- Population (2021): 60
- Time zone: UTC+3 (TRT)

Ağzıbüyük is a village in the Çankırı District of Çankırı Province in Turkey. Its population is 60 (2021).
