= National Meat Institute =

Coordinates: 34°54′22.5″S 56°12′16″W

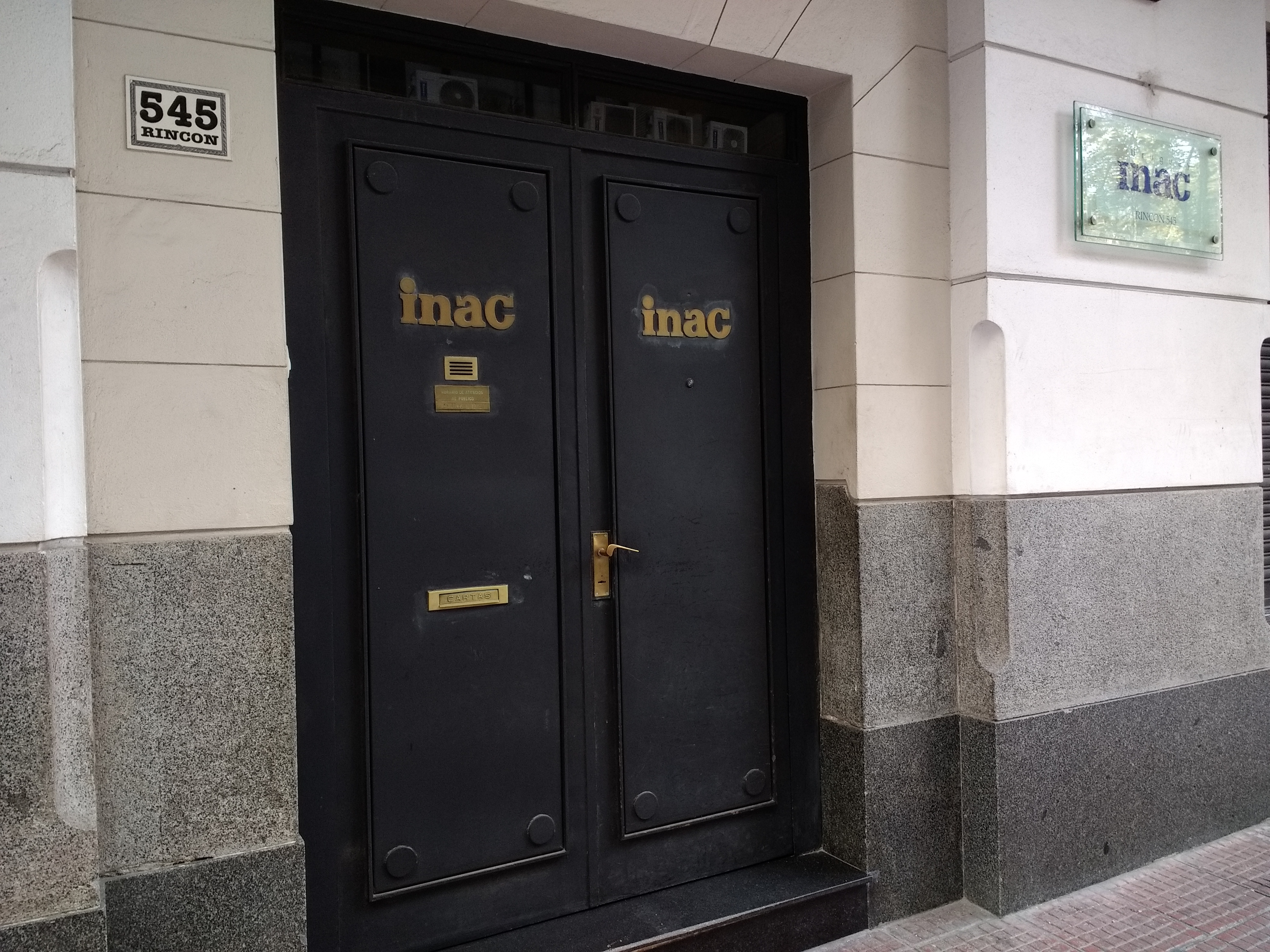
Headquarters in Montevideo

The National Meat Institute (Instituto Nacional de Carnes, INAC) is a governmental agency of Uruguay. Its headquarters are in Rincon Str. 545, Ciudad Vieja, Montevideo. Decree-Law No. 15,605 of July 27, 1984 created the agency.
