= Sameteli, Yenice =

Village in Turkey

Sameteli
- Village
- Location in Turkey Sameteli (Marmara)
- Coordinates: 39.8868°N 27.3707°E
- Country: Turkey
- Province: Çanakkale
- District: Yenice
- Population (2021): 173
- Time zone: UTC+3 (TRT)

Sameteli is a village in the Yenice District of Çanakkale Province in Turkey. Its population is 173 (2021).
