= Tuzlu, Çankırı =

Village in Turkey

Tuzlu
- Village
- Location in Turkey Tuzlu (Turkey Central Anatolia)
- Coordinates: 40°37′23″N 33°40′23″E
- Country: Turkey
- Province: Çankırı
- District: Çankırı
- Population (2021): 182
- Time zone: UTC+3 (TRT)

Tuzlu is a village in the Çankırı District of Çankırı Province in Turkey. Its population is 182 (2021).
