= Sabri Çakır =

Sabri Çakır (1955 in Denizli, Turkey – 2024) was a poet. He moved to West Germany in 1978, joining family members who had moved to the area earlier. He was also a teacher of Turkish children in Gelsenkirchen. Çakır has published poems in both German and Turkish magazines. In 1984 an entire collection of his poetry was published in Turkey.
