= Çatalelma, Çankırı =

Village in Turkey

Çatalelma
- Village
- Location in Turkey Çatalelma (Turkey Central Anatolia)
- Coordinates: 40°19′32″N 33°45′19″E
- Country: Turkey
- Province: Çankırı
- District: Çankırı
- Population (2021): 399
- Time zone: UTC+3 (TRT)

Çatalelma is a village in the Çankırı District of Çankırı Province in Turkey. Its population is 399 (2021).
