= Seher Çakır =

Turkish-Austrian poet

Seher Çakır (born 1971 in Istanbul, Turkey) is a Turkish-Austrian poet and the founding member and author of the German-Turkish newspaper Öneri. Since 1983 she has been living in Vienna.

== Works ==
Çakır, living in Wien since 1983, released her first lyrics in the bilingual (German/Turkish) journal Öneri. Short stories have additionally been published in the anthologies Die Fremde in mir (the foreign within me) (1999) and Eure Sprache ist nicht meine Sprache (your language is not my language) (2002).

The National Library of German Lyrics (Nationalbibliothek des deutschsprachigen Gedichtes in München) tabulates Çakır in its 2003 list of collected works (Ausgewählte Werke VI) (2003).

In 2005, Çakır was awarded at the literature competitions "Schreiben zwischen den Kulturen" (writing between cultures).
