= Çırçır, Çankırı =

Village in Turkey

Çırçır
- Village
- Country: Turkey
- Province: Çankırı
- District: Çankırı
- Population (2021): 40
- Time zone: UTC+3 (TRT)

Çırçır is a village in the Çankırı District of Çankırı Province in Turkey. Its population is 40 (2021).
