= Seyvan, Yenice =

Village in Turkey

Seyvan
- Village
- Country: Turkey
- Province: Çanakkale
- District: Yenice
- Population (2021): 347
- Time zone: UTC+3 (TRT)

Seyvan is a village in the Yenice District of Çanakkale Province in Turkey. Its population is 347 (2021).
