= Hamza Çakır =

German footballer (born 1985)

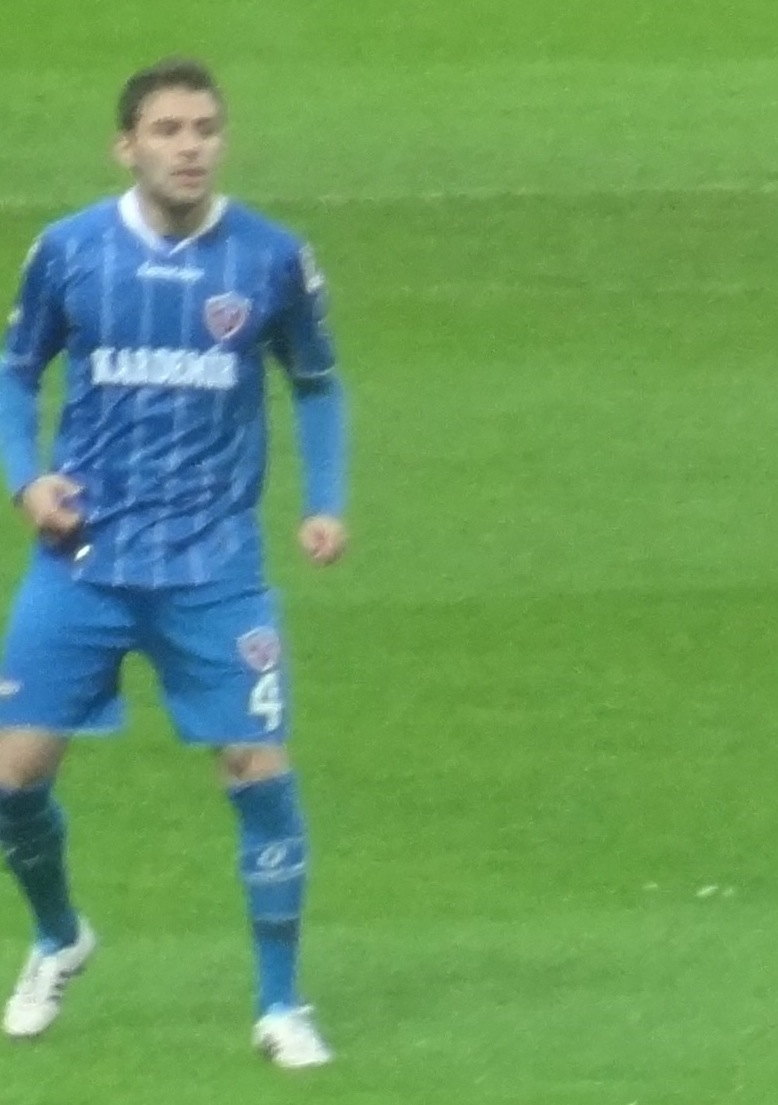

Personal information
- Full name: Hamza Çakır Çatakoğlu
- Date of birth: 30 September 1985 (age 41)
- Place of birth: Cologne, West Germany
- Height: 1.83 m (6 ft 0 in)
- Position: Defender

Youth career
- 2000–2004: Fortuna Düsseldorf

Senior career*
Years	Team	Apps	(Gls)
2004–2010	Fortuna Düsseldorf	142	(4)
2010	Fortuna Düsseldorf II	2	(1)
2010–2011	Kayserispor	19	(0)
2011–2012	Karabükspor	11	(0)
2013	Fortuna Düsseldorf II	3	(0)
2014	KFC Uerdingen 05		
- * Club domestic league appearances and goals

Hamza Çakır (born 30 September 1985) is a German former footballer. He played in the 2. Bundesliga for Fortuna Düsseldorf and in the Süper Lig for Kayserispor and Karabükspor.

== Career ==
Çakır began playing football with the youth side of Fortuna Düsseldorf. He signed a professional contract with the club in 2004, and would captain the side to promotion from the 3. Liga during the 2008–09 season. Due to injury, he would only play nine league matches during the following season, and could not agree to terms on a new contract. At age 24, after 10 years with Fortuna, Çakır moved to Turkey to play for Kayserispor; after two years he moved back to Düsseldorf. He retired from professional football in 2014.

== Personal life ==
Çakır is of Turkish descent. He is married and has a son. After his retirement from football, he founded a Turkish café in Cologne with his family.

== Career statistics ==
Club performance			League		Cup		Continental		Total	
Season	Club	League	Apps	Goals	Apps	Goals	Apps	Goals	Apps	Goals
Germany			League		DFB-Pokal		Europe		Total	
2004–05	Fortuna Düsseldorf	Regionalliga Nord	15	0	0	0	-		15	0
2005–06	Fortuna Düsseldorf	Regionalliga Nord	30	2	0	0	-		30	2
2006–07	Fortuna Düsseldorf	Regionalliga Nord	29	0	0	0	-		29	0
2007–08	Fortuna Düsseldorf	Regionalliga Nord	28	1	0	0	-		28	1
2008–09	Fortuna Düsseldorf	3. Liga	31	1	0	0	-		31	1
2009–10	Fortuna Düsseldorf	2. Bundesliga	9	0	1	0	-		10	0
2009–10	Fortuna Düsseldorf II	Regionalliga West	2	1	0	0	-		2	0
Turkey			League		Turkish Cup		Europe		Total	
2010–11	Kayserispor	Süper Lig	2	0	0	0	-		2	0
Total	Germany		144	5	1	0	0	0	145	5
Total	Turkey		2	0	0	0	0	0	2	0
Career total			146	5	1	0	0	0	147	5

Statistics accurate as of last match played on 20 August 2010.
