= Kalkım =

- Municipality
- Location in Turkey Kalkım (Marmara)
- Coordinates: 39°49′N 27°13′E
- Country: Turkey
- Province: Çanakkale
- District: Yenice

Government
  - Mayor: Zeynep Çelik (AK Party)
- Elevation: 230 m (750 ft)
- Population (2021): 2,400
- Time zone: UTC+3 (TRT)
- Postal code: 17560
- Area code: 0286

Kalkım is a town (belde) in the Yenice District, Çanakkale Province, Turkey. Its population is 2,400 (2021).

== Geography ==
Kalkım is situated to east of Kalkım pond and to the south of Agonya creek. The distance to Yenice is 38 kilometres (24 mi) and to Çanakkale is 120 kilometres (75 mi).

== Population ==
As per population census 2022, Kalkım has a population of 2430.

== History ==
The area around Kalkım was an important ironworking center during Lydian state and was named as Agonya. During the later years of the ancient age, It was annexed by Achaemenid Empire, Macedonian Empire, Pergamon and Roman Empire. In 1301, it was incorporated into Karesi state (a small Turkmen beylik) After the disintegration of Karesi it became a part of the Ottoman Empire . During Ottoman era it was called Naipli (Naipli is an adjective referring to vice judge working in the settlement). In the 20th century, following a brief Greek occupation it became a part of Turkey in 1922. In 1977 It was declared a seat of township.

== Economy ==
Most important agricultural products of the town are paprika and tobacco. Various fruits are also produced. Some town residents work in lead mines around the town and some work in forestry business. Carpet weaving is another business.
