= Hıdırlık, Çankırı =

Village in Turkey

Hıdırlık
- Village
- Location in Turkey Hıdırlık (Turkey Central Anatolia)
- Coordinates: 40°35′49″N 33°34′40″E
- Country: Turkey
- Province: Çankırı
- District: Çankırı
- Population (2021): 37
- Time zone: UTC+3 (TRT)

Hıdırlık is a village in the Çankırı District of Çankırı Province in Turkey. Its population is 37 (2021).
