= İnaç, Çankırı =

Village in Turkey

İnaç
- Village
- Location in Turkey İnaç (Turkey Central Anatolia)
- Coordinates: 40.6303°N 33.6951°E
- Country: Turkey
- Province: Çankırı
- District: Çankırı
- Population (2021): 187
- Time zone: UTC+3 (TRT)

İnaç is a village in the Çankırı District of Çankırı Province in Turkey. Its population is 187 (2021).
