= Doğantepe, Çankırı =

Village in Turkey

Doğantepe
- Village
- Location in Turkey Doğantepe (Turkey Central Anatolia)
- Coordinates: 40.544°N 33.652°E
- Country: Turkey
- Province: Çankırı
- District: Çankırı
- Population (2021): 310
- Time zone: UTC+3 (TRT)

Doğantepe is a village in the Çankırı District of Çankırı Province in Turkey. Its population is 310 (2021).
