= Faruk Çakır =

Turkish association football player

Personal information
- Full name: Faruk Çakır
- Date of birth: 8 February 1995 (age 31)
- Place of birth: Eyüp, Turkey
- Height: 1.91 m (6 ft 3 in)
- Position: Goalkeeper

Team information
- Current team: Bayrampaşaspor
- Number: 15

Youth career
- 2005–2013: İstanbul Başakşehir

Senior career*
Years	Team	Apps	(Gls)
2013–2019	İstanbul Başakşehir	0	(0)
2019–	Bayrampaşaspor	3	(0)
- * Club domestic league appearances and goals as of 05:07, 13 April 2021 (UTC)

Faruk Çakır (born 8 February 1995) is a Turkish professional footballer who plays as a goalkeeper for Bayrampaşaspor in the Turkish TFF Third League.

== Professional career ==
Faruk is a youth academy product of İstanbul Başakşehir F.K., and signed his first professional contract with them in 2013. He made his first senior appearance for Başakşehir in a 4-0 Turkish Cup win over Tepecik Belediyespor on 1 February 2016. Faruk made his professional debut for Başakşehir in a 2-2 Turkish Cup tie with Fenerbahçe on 26 April 2017. He left the club by mutual termination on 8 August 2019.
