= Lists of municipalities in Turkey =

The following lists give the municipalities of Turkey within each province:

== Provinces and municipalities ==
Province	Municipalities
Adana Province	List of municipalities in Adana Province
Adıyaman Province	List of municipalities in Adıyaman Province
Afyonkarahisar Province	List of municipalities in Afyonkarahisar Province
Ağrı Province	List of municipalities in Ağrı Province
Aksaray Province	List of municipalities in Aksaray Province
Amasya Province	List of municipalities in Amasya Province
Ankara Province	List of municipalities in Ankara Province
Antalya Province	List of municipalities in Antalya Province
Ardahan Province	List of municipalities in Ardahan Province
Artvin Province	List of municipalities in Artvin Province
Aydın Province	List of municipalities in Aydın Province
Balıkesir Province	List of municipalities in Balıkesir Province
Bartın Province	List of municipalities in Bartın Province
Batman Province	List of municipalities in Batman Province
Bayburt Province	List of municipalities in Bayburt Province
Bilecik Province	List of municipalities in Bilecik Province
Bingöl Province	List of municipalities in Bingöl Province
Bitlis Province	List of municipalities in Bitlis Province
Bolu Province	List of municipalities in Bolu Province
Burdur Province	List of municipalities in Burdur Province
Bursa Province	List of municipalities in Bursa Province
Çanakkale Province	List of municipalities in Çanakkale Province
Çankırı Province	List of municipalities in Çankırı Province
Çorum Province	List of municipalities in Çorum Province
Denizli Province	List of municipalities in Denizli Province
Diyarbakır Province	List of municipalities in Diyarbakır Province
Düzce Province	List of municipalities in Düzce Province
Edirne Province	List of municipalities in Edirne Province
Elazığ Province	List of municipalities in Elazığ Province
Erzincan Province	List of municipalities in Erzincan Province
Erzurum Province	List of municipalities in Erzurum Province
Eskişehir Province	List of municipalities in Eskişehir Province
Gaziantep Province	List of municipalities in Gaziantep Province
Giresun Province	List of municipalities in Giresun Province
Gümüşhane Province	List of municipalities in Gümüşhane Province
Hakkari Province	List of municipalities in Hakkari Province
Hatay Province	List of municipalities in Hatay Province
Iğdır Province	List of municipalities in Iğdır Province
Isparta Province	List of municipalities in Isparta Province
İstanbul Province	List of municipalities in İstanbul Province
İzmir Province	List of municipalities in İzmir Province
Kahramanmaraş Province	List of municipalities in Kahramanmaraş Province
Karabük Province	List of municipalities in Karabük Province
Karaman Province	List of municipalities in Karaman Province
Kars Province	List of municipalities in Kars Province
Kastamonu Province	List of municipalities in Kastamonu Province
Kayseri Province	List of municipalities in Kayseri Province
Kırıkkale Province	List of municipalities in Kırıkkale Province
Kırklareli Province	List of municipalities in Kırklareli Province
Kırşehir Province	List of municipalities in Kırşehir Province
Kilis Province	List of municipalities in Kilis Province
Kocaeli Province	List of municipalities in Kocaeli Province
Konya Province	List of municipalities in Konya Province
Kütahya Province	List of municipalities in Kütahya Province
Malatya Province	List of municipalities in Malatya Province
Manisa Province	List of municipalities in Manisa Province
Mardin Province	List of municipalities in Mardin Province
Mersin Province	List of municipalities in Mersin Province
Muğla Province	List of municipalities in Muğla Province
Muş Province	List of municipalities in Muş Province
Nevşehir Province	List of municipalities in Nevşehir Province
Niğde Province	List of municipalities in Niğde Province
Ordu Province	List of municipalities in Ordu Province
Osmaniye Province	List of municipalities in Osmaniye Province
Rize Province	List of municipalities in Rize Province
Sakarya Province	List of municipalities in Sakarya Province
Samsun Province	List of municipalities in Samsun Province
Siirt Province	List of municipalities in Siirt Province
Sinop Province	List of municipalities in Sinop Province
Sivas Province	List of municipalities in Sivas Province
Şanlıurfa Province	List of municipalities in Şanlıurfa Province
Şırnak Province	List of municipalities in Şırnak Province
Tekirdağ Province	List of municipalities in Tekirdağ Province
Tokat Province	List of municipalities in Tokat Province
Trabzon Province	List of municipalities in Trabzon Province
Tunceli Province	List of municipalities in Tunceli Province
Uşak Province	List of municipalities in Uşak Province
Van Province	List of municipalities in Van Province
Yalova Province	List of municipalities in Yalova Province
Yozgat Province	List of municipalities in Yozgat Province
Zonguldak Province	List of municipalities in Zonguldak Province
