= List of populated places in Kırıkkale Province =

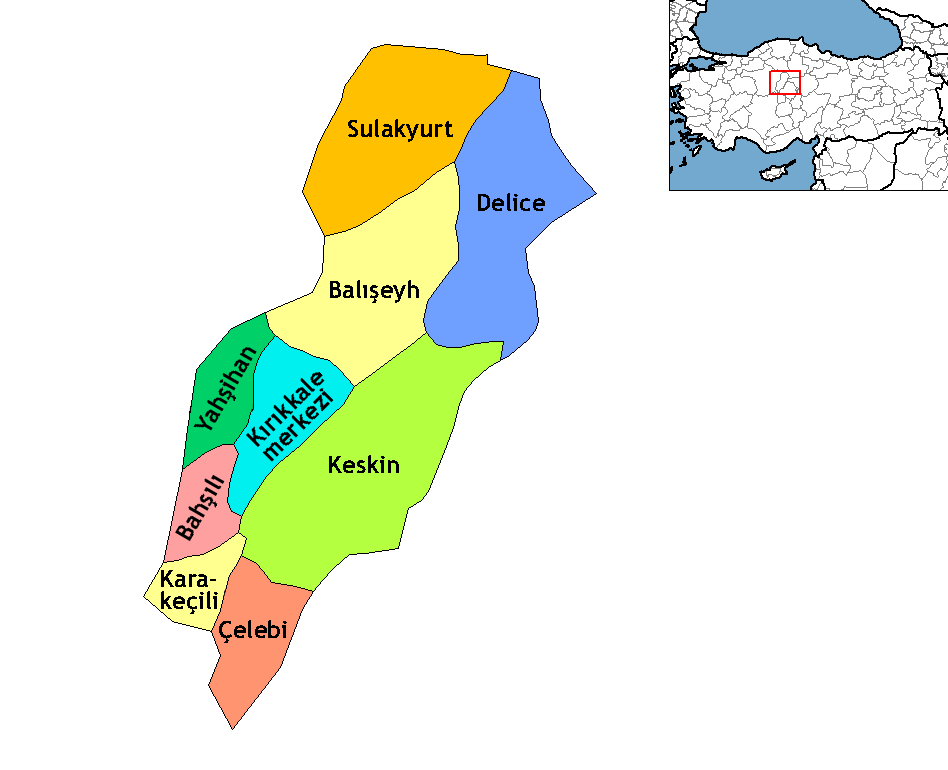
Kırıkkale Province

Below is the list of populated places in Kırıkkale Province, Turkey by the districts. In the following lists first place in each list is the administrative center of the district.

== Kırıkkale ==
- Kırıkkale
- Ahılı, Kırıkkale
- Dağevi, Kırıkkale
- Hacılar, Kırıkkale
- Hasandede, Kırıkkale
- Karacaali, Kırıkkale
- Kazmaca, Kırıkkale
- Kızıldere, Kırıkkale
- Pazarcık, Kırıkkale
- Ulaş, Kırıkkale
- Yukarımahmutlar, Kırıkkale

== Bahşili ==
- Bahşili
- Çamlıca, Bahşili
- Karaahmetli, Bahşili
- Küçüksarıkayalar, Bahşili
- Küreboğazı, Bahşili
- Sarıkayalar, Bahşili

== Balışeyh ==
- Balışeyh
- Akçakavak, Balışeyh
- Aşağıkarakısık, Balışeyh
- Aydınşıh, Balışeyh
- Battaloba, Balışeyh
- Beşbıçak, Balışeyh
- Beyoba, Balışeyh
- Bıyıkaydın, Balışeyh
- Dikmen, Balışeyh
- Eldelek, Balışeyh
- Hıdırşıh, Balışeyh
- Hüseyinoba, Balışeyh
- Işıklar, Balışeyh
- İzzettin, Balışeyh
- Karalı, Balışeyh
- Kargın, Balışeyh
- Kenanoba, Balışeyh
- Kılevli, Balışeyh
- Kırlangıç, Balışeyh
- Koçubaba, Balışeyh
- Kösedurak, Balışeyh
- Kulaksız, Balışeyh
- Mehmetbeyobası, Balışeyh
- Selamlı, Balışeyh
- Ulaklı, Balışeyh
- Uzunlar, Balışeyh
- Yenice, Balışeyh
- Yenilli, Balışeyh
- Yukarıkarakısık, Balışeyh

== Çelebi ==
- Çelebi
- Alıcıyeniyapan, Çelebi
- Çiftevi, Çelebi
- Hacıyusuflu, Çelebi
- Halildede, Çelebi
- İğdebeli, Çelebi
- Kaldırım, Çelebi
- Karaağaç, Çelebi
- Karaağıl, Çelebi
- Karabucak, Çelebi
- Karahacılı, Çelebi
- Karayakup, Çelebi
- Kepirli, Çelebi
- Tilkili, Çelebi

== Delice ==
- Delice
- Akboğaz, Delice
- Alcılı, Delice
- Arbişli, Delice
- Aşağıihsangazili, Delice
- Baraklı, Delice
- Bozköy, Delice
- Büyükafşar, Delice
- Büyükyağlı, Delice
- Coğul, Delice
- Çatallı, Delice
- Çatallıkarakoyunlu, Delice
- Çerikli, Delice
- Çongar, Delice
- Dağobası, Delice
- Derekışla, Delice
- Doğanören, Delice
- Elmalı, Delice
- Evliyalı, Delice
- Fadılobası, Delice
- Gözükızıllı, Delice
- Hacıobası, Delice
- Halitli, Delice
- Herekli, Delice
- İmirli, Delice
- Karaköseli, Delice
- Karpuz, Delice
- Kavakköy, Delice
- Kocabaş, Delice
- Kurtoğlu, Delice
- Kuzayyurt, Delice
- Küçükafşar, Delice
- Meşeyayla, Delice
- Ocakbaşı, Delice
- Sarıyaka, Delice
- Şahcalı, Delice
- Taşyazı, Delice
- Tatlıcak, Delice
- Tavaözü, Delice
- Tekkeköy, Delice
- Yaylayurt, Delice
- Yeniyapan, Delice

== Karakeçili ==
- Karakeçili
- Akkoşan, Karakeçili
- Sulubük, Karakeçili

== Keskin ==
- Keskin
- Armutlu, Keskin
- Aşağışıh, Keskin
- Barak, Keskin
- Barakobası, Keskin
- Beşler, Keskin
- Büyükceceli, Keskin
- Cabatobası, Keskin
- Cankurtaran, Keskin
- Cebrailli, Keskin
- Ceritkale, Keskin
- Ceritmüminli, Keskin
- Ceritobası, Keskin
- Cinali, Keskin
- Çalış, Keskin
- Çamurabatmaz, Keskin
- Çipideresi, Keskin
- Dağsolaklısı, Keskin
- Danacıobası, Keskin
- Efendiköy, Keskin
- Eminefendi, Keskin
- Eroğlu, Keskin
- Esatmüminli, Keskin
- Eskialibudak, Keskin
- Gazibeyli, Keskin
- Göçbeyli, Keskin
- Göktaş, Keskin
- Gülkonak, Keskin
- Hacıaliobası, Keskin
- Hacıömersolaklısı, Keskin
- Haydardede, Keskin
- İnziloğlu, Keskin
- Kaçakköy, Keskin
- Karafakılı, Keskin
- Kasımağa, Keskin
- Kavlak, Keskin
- Kavurgalı, Keskin
- Kayalaksolaklısı, Keskin
- Kevenli, Keskin
- Konur, Keskin
- Konurhacıobası, Keskin
- Köprüköy, Keskin
- Kurşunkaya, Keskin
- Kuzugüdenli, Keskin
- Müsellim, Keskin
- Olunlu, Keskin
- Ortasöken, Keskin
- Polatyurdu, Keskin
- Seyfli, Keskin
- Takazlı, Keskin
- Turhanlı, Keskin
- Üçevler, Keskin
- Üçkuyu, Keskin
- Yenialibudak, Keskin
- Yeniyapan, Keskin
- Yoncalı, Keskin

== Sulakyurt ==
- Sulakyurt
- Ağaylı, Sulakyurt
- Akkuyu, Sulakyurt
- Alişeyhli, Sulakyurt
- Ambardere, Sulakyurt
- Ayvatlı, Sulakyurt
- Çayoba, Sulakyurt
- Çevrimli, Sulakyurt
- Danacı, Sulakyurt
- Deredüzü, Sulakyurt
- Esenpınar, Sulakyurt
- Faraşlı, Sulakyurt
- Güzelyurt, Sulakyurt
- Hamzalı, Sulakyurt
- İmamoğluçeşmesi, Sulakyurt
- Kalekışla, Sulakyurt
- Kıyıhalilinceli, Sulakyurt
- Kıyıkavurgalı, Sulakyurt
- Koruköy, Sulakyurt
- Ortaköy, Sulakyurt
- Sarıkızlı, Sulakyurt
- Sarımbey, Sulakyurt
- Sofularçiftliği, Sulakyurt
- Yağbasan, Sulakyurt
- Yeniceli, Sulakyurt
- Yeşilli, Sulakyurt
- Yeşilyazı, Sulakyurt

== Yahşihan ==
- Yahşihan
- Bedesten, Yahşihan
- Hacıbalı, Yahşihan
- Hisarköy, Yahşihan
- Irmak, Yahşihan
- Keçili, Yahşihan
- Kılıçlar, Yahşihan
- Mahmutlar, Yahşihan
