= List of municipalities in Kırıkkale Province =

This is the List of municipalities in Kırıkkale Province, Turkey as of March 2023.

District	Municipality
Bahşılı	Bahşılı
Balışeyh	Balışeyh
Çelebi	Çelebi
Delice	Çerikli
Delice	Delice
Karakeçili	Karakeçili
Keskin	Keskin
Kırıkkale	Hacılar
Kırıkkale	Kırıkkale
Sulakyurt	Sulakyurt
Yahşihan	Yahşihan
