= Karakeçili (tribe) =

Turkoman tribe

Karakeçili Tribe
Karakeçili Aşireti

Regions with significant populations
- Turkey: Balıkesir, Bilecik, Kütahya, Sultanönü, Aydın, Bursa, Kırıkkale, Uşak

Languages
- Turkish

Related ethnic groups
- Oghuz Turks, Turkish People

The Karakeçili tribe belongs to the Kayı branch of the Bozok division of the Oghuz Turks and settled in the lands of present-day Turkey after the Battle of Manzikert in 1071. Today, their population is concentrated across Central, Western, Eastern, and Southeastern Anatolia.

== History ==
The Karakeçili tribe belongs to the Kayı branch of the Bozok division, one of the two main branches of the Oghuz Turks, and settled in Anatolia following the Battle of Manzikert, in which the Great Seljuk Empire defeated the Byzantine Empire.

According to historical sources, the tribe composed of Tatars and Turkmens, first moved toward the Erzurum and Erzincan regions, and later descended into the Southeastern Anatolia region. After the death of their leader Suleyman Shah, part of the tribe dispersed to Beriyye (an administrative region located between present-day Viranşehir and Derik), while another part spread into Anatolia. After the death of Süleyman Shah, there are differing views regarding the fate of the group led by Ertuğrul, who became the head of the tribe.

According to the Ruhî Chronicles, the group settled on the foothills of Karaca Dağ near Engüri (present-day Ankara). Between 1222 and 1230, upon learning of the conflicts between John III Doukas Vatatzes, Emperor of Nicaea, and Alaaddin Keykubad I, Sultan of the Sultanate of Rum, around Sultan Öyüğü (present-day Eskişehir) and Engürü (present-day Ankara), Ertuğrul Gazi joined the fighting to serve the army and took part in the siege of Karacahisar. In 1230, peace was established between Alaeddin Keykubad I and John III after the Battle of Köse Dağ against the Mogols and the Battle of Yassıçemen against the Khwarazmshah. Soon afterward, Alaeddin Keykubad granted Söğüt as Kishlak (winter Pasture) and Domaniç as Yaylak (summer pasture) to Ertuğrul Gazi or his forebears. Ottoman historian Neşri conveys this information from Rûhî Çelebi who records it in the Ruhî Chronicles. Aşıkpaşazade, however, shortened these accounts and altered their content, transferring the events to the period of Osman I.

According to another account, Ertuğrul Gazi and his tribe, who settled either in Sürmeli Çukur (the Aras River valley) or in Ahlat before moving to the foothills of Karacadağ near Engüri, remained there for a time and joined the army of Alaeddin Keykubad I against John III, Emperor of Nicaea. However, after Alaeddin Keykubad I returned to Konya due to the Mongol attacks, he assigned Söğüt as winter quarters and Domaliç as summer pastures to Ertuğrul Gazi.

According to historical records, Abdul Hamid II formed a 200-man lance unit composed of selected Karakeçili youths, known as the Söğütlü Maiyet Unit. Its Karakeçili commander, Mehmed Efendi, spent the nights next to the room where Sultan Abdülhamid slept, together with other tribesmen from the Karakeçili who also served in the unit. It is recorded that Abdülhamid II referred to them as “my own tribesmen” and introduced the Söğütlü Maiyet Unit to the German Emperor Wilhelm II as “my relatives.”

== Etymology ==
In his study titled Karakeçili Tribes and Settlements, the Turkish historian Üçler Bulduk notes that a treatise written during the reign of Sultan Abdul Hamid II states that the tribe received its name from Ertuğrul. According to this account, during the conquest of Karaca Hisar, the tribe resorted to a stratagem by tying lanterns to the horns of black goats and covering a type of felt tent called alaycık (alacık) with a cloth; whereupon Ertuğrul Gazi exclaimed, “Forward, my alps, forward, my Kara keçili Yörüks,” thus giving rise to the tribe being known as Karakeçili (literally: “those of the black goats”). On another page describing the alaycık, it is suggested that the tribe’s name derives from the idea that the smoke rising from the window at the center of the tent, which was covered with white felt, darkened the felt and turned it into “black felt” (Kara keçe in Turkish).

== Current status ==
Members of the Karakeçili tribe today are concentrated in two main geographical areas: Central and Western Anatolia, and the Southern and Eastern Anatolia regions.

=== Eastern and Southeastern Anatolia ===
In the Ottoman records, the Karakeçili groups in Siverek and Viranşehir are described as Turkomans, but over time, for various reasons, they abandoned Turkish and began to speak Arabic and Kurdish. According to Ziya Gökalp, who states that Kurdish tribes are divided into two branches, Mil and Zil, the Karakeçili tribe of Southeastern Anatolia belongs to the Zil branch. Documents from the reign of Selim II indicate that most members of the Karakeçili tribe in the region lived a nomadic life. In 1891, members of the Karakeçili tribe living in Southeastern Anatolia were also included in the Hamidiye regiments established by Abdul Hamid II. In Elazığ and Tunceli, however, there are Karakeçili groups that have preserved their Turkish language and identity.

=== Central and Western Anatolia ===
Members of the Karakeçili tribe living in Ankara and its surroundings had a more orderly administrative structure compared to those in Southeastern Anatolia. According to 16th-century records, the tribe’s members in this region were part of a unit called Yörükân-ı Ankara, and most of them led a nomadic way of life. A 1571 Ottoman tahrir register notes that the "Karakeçilü" community, recorded under the section known as the Town Yörüks of the Ankara Yörüks, was listed as a community that had adopted a settled way of life. According to a 1576 document, in this administrative unit located in the southern and western parts of Ankara, there were 56 communities comprising a total of 2,445 taxpayers, indicating a population of roughly 10,000 people. However, it is not clear how many of these communities were affiliated with the Karakeçili tribe.

The area inhabited by members of the tribe extended across what are now Çukurca,Elmadağ and its surroundings, Karakeçili, Bala, and the plains stretching from Sincan to Polatlı. The presence of tribe members is also attested in regions extending from the northern and eastern parts of Ankara to Beypazarı, Sivrihisar, and Sultanönü (present-day Eskişehir). In the 16th century, while some members of the tribe living in the Kırşehir and Ankara districts migrated westward to Sultanönü, others adopted a settled lifestyle in their existing localities. Their descendants continue to reside in the villages of these districts today.

In the 19th century, most Karakeçili clans in the Eskişehir region migrated and settled in Balıkesir, İvrindi, and Balya. With these migrations, Western Anatolia became one of the regions where the tribe was most densely concentrated. Today, they maintain a strong presence particularly in Kütahya, Eskişehir, Uşak, Bursa, Aydın, Balıkesir, and Bilecik. The Karakeçili District of Kırıkkale Province, where the tribe is still numerous, takes its name from the tribe.

== Karakeçili festivals ==
The Ertuğrul Gazi Commemoration and Söğüt Festivals, held by members of the Karakeçili tribe at the Tomb of Ertuğrul Gazi in the Söğüt district of Bilecik; the Traditional Karakeçili Festival, which began in 1999 in the Siverek district of Şanlıurfa; the celebrations held on Kumru Mountain in Gaziantep and the Karakeçili International Culture Festival, initiated in 1995 in the Karakeçili district of Kırıkkale, are among the principal festivals organized by the tribe.
