= Çeşnigir Bridge =

Çeşnigir Bridge Çeşnigir Köprüsü
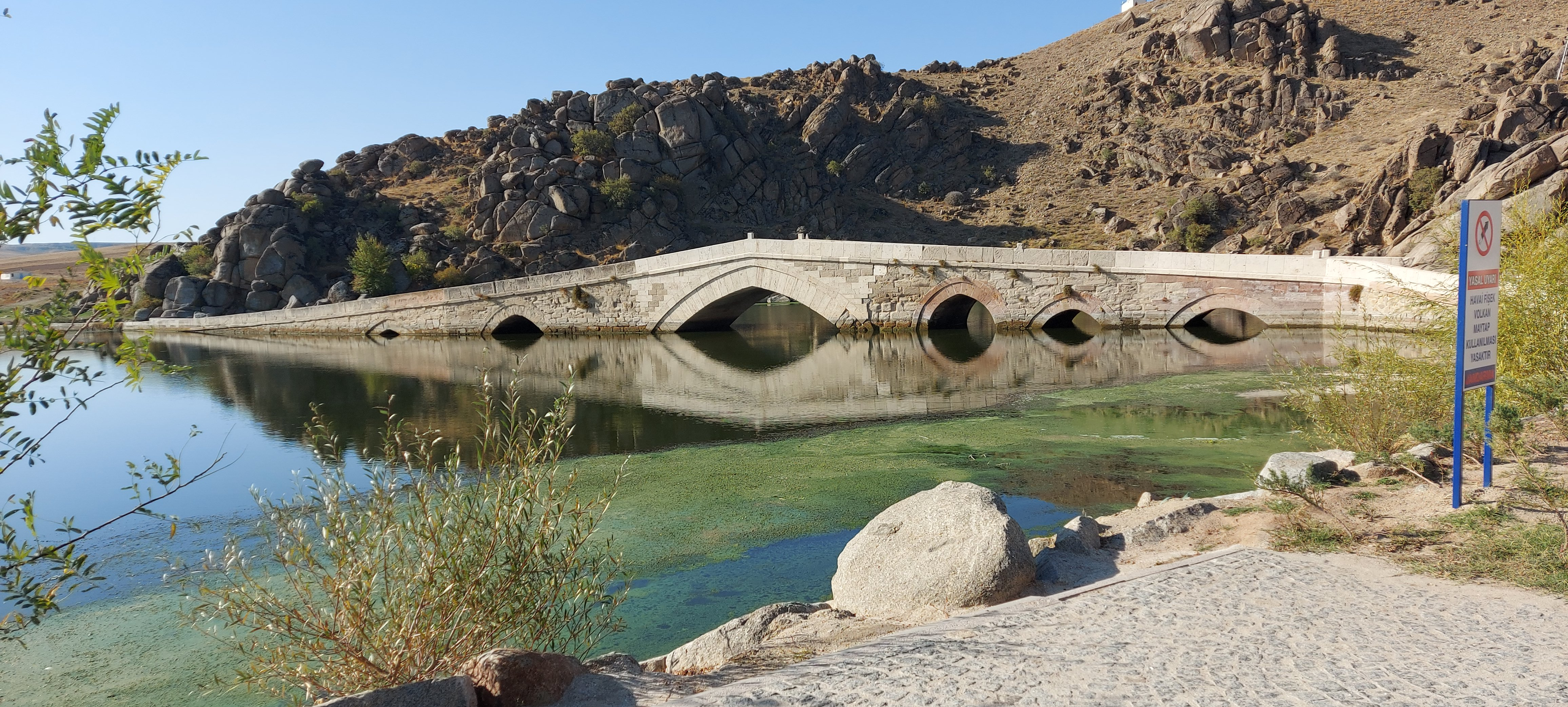
- Çeşnigir Bridge, Kırıkkale Province, Turkey
- Coordinates: 39°34′51″N 33°25′46″E
- Crosses: Kızılırmak River
- Locale: between Karakeçili and Köprüköy in Kırıkkale Province, Turkey

Characteristics
- Design: Arch bridge
- Material: Stone masonry
- Total length: 110 m (360 ft)
- No. of spans: 9

History
- Construction end: 13th century
- Closed: 1989

Çeşnigir Bridge is a medieval bridge across the Kızılırmak River between the towns of Karakeçili and Köprüköy in Kırıkkale Province, Turkey. It was built during the period of the Seljuk Sultanate of Rum.

== History ==
There is no precise record of when the bridge was built, but it has been dated to the 13th century based on architectural and historical sources. Tradition says that the army of Timur passed over the bridge on their way to the Battle of Ankara in 1402. The architect Mimar Sinan supervised reconstruction of the bridge as part of preparations for the Egyptian Expedition of Yavuz Sultan Selim. There were further repairs during the 20th century.

The bridge was open to vehicle traffic until 1989, when it was closed due to the rise in water level after the construction of the Kapulukaya Dam. Although the bridge is now only open to pedestrians, restoration work in 2010 was carried out by the 4th Region Highways Directorate.

== Construction ==
The bridge was built of cut stone and is 110 metres (360 ft) and 6 metres (20 ft) wide. It has a total of 12 arches, nine primary ones and three others to reduce the weight of the abutments. The bridge is a noted example of Seljuk architecture.
