= Çelebi (disambiguation) =

Çelebi is an Ottoman title and modern surname.

Çelebi or Celebi may also refer to:

== Places ==
Çelebi is the toponym of following places in Turkey:

- Çelebi, Kırıkkale, town in Kırıkkale Province, seat of:
  - Çelebi District, district of Kırıkkale Province
- Çelebi, Karakoçan, village in Elazığ Province
- Çelebi, Keşan, village in Edirne Province
- Çelebi, Kovancılar, village in Elazığ Province
- Çelebi, Yenişehir, village in Bursa Province
- Çelebi Island, island in the Aegean Sea, Muğla Province

== Other uses ==
- Celebi, a generation II Pokémon

== See also ==
- Celebic (disambiguation)
- Čelebići (disambiguation)
