= Kırcalar =

Kırcalar can refer to the following villages in Turkey:

- Kırcalar, Azdavay
- Kırcalar, Kastamonu
- Kırcalar, Lapseki
