= Köprüköy, Keskin =

Köprüköy
- Village
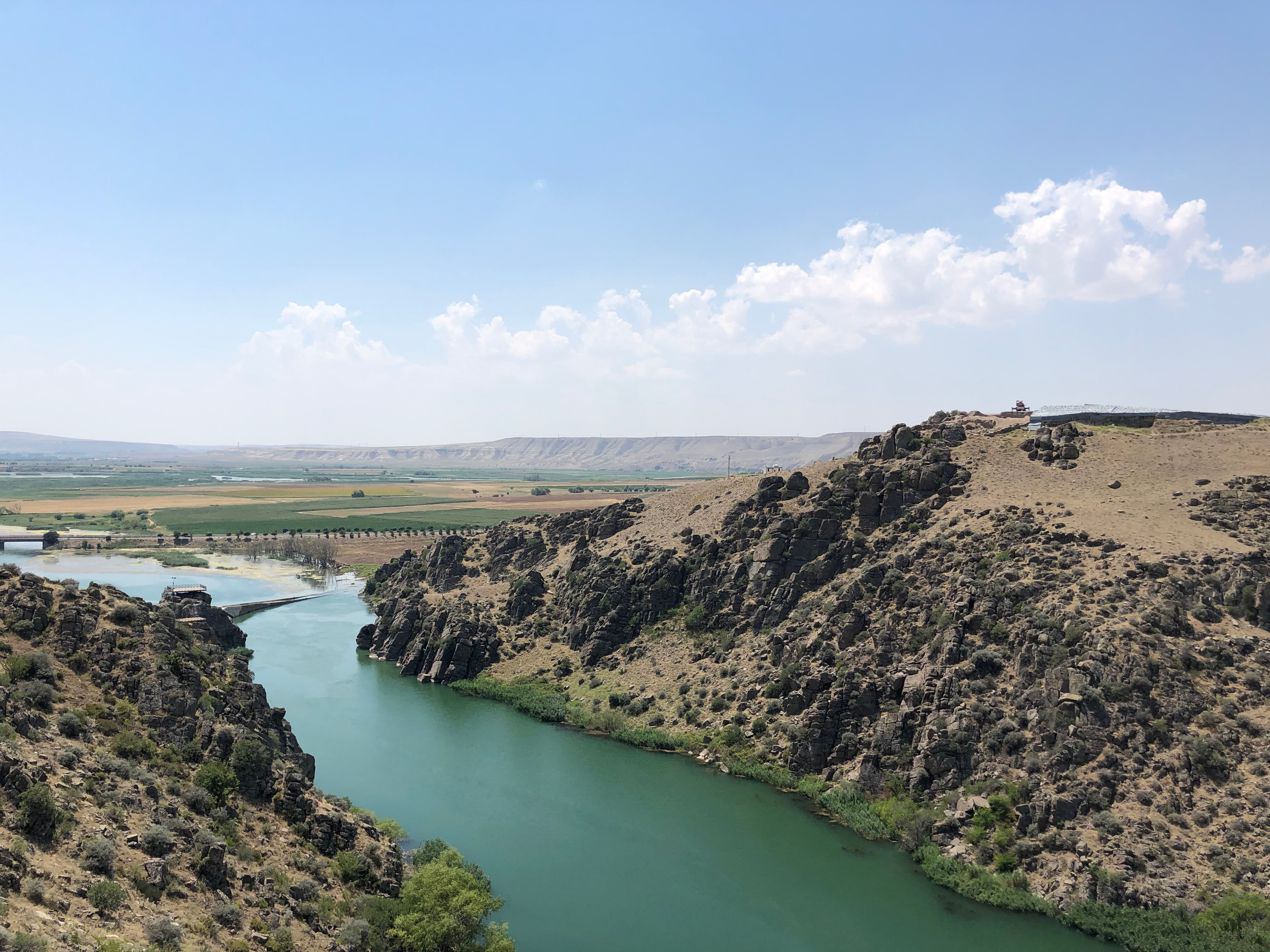
- Kızılırmak River viewed from Köprüköy Terrace

- Location within Turkey Location within Turkey Central Anatolia
- Coordinates: 39°35′N 33°26′E
- Country: Turkey
- Province: Kırıkkale
- District: Keskin
- Elevation: 760 m (2,490 ft)
- Population (2022): 1,815
- Time zone: UTC+3 (TRT)
- Postal code: 71820
- Area code: 0318

Köprüköy (English: "bridge village", also called Köprü) is a village in Keskin District of Kırıkkale Province, Turkey. Its population is 630 (2022). Before the 2013 reorganisation, it was a town (belde). It is situated on Turkish state highway D.260 and to the east of the Kızılırmak River reservoir. The distance to Keskin is 30 kilometres (19 mi). According to the mayor’s page the settlement was founded during the Seljuk domination (11th to 13th centuries) and it was named after the famous bridge which was in use up to recent times. (It is now partially submerged in the Kapulukaya Dam reservoir.) In 1972 the settlement was declared a seat of township. The main activity of the town is agriculture. Cereals as well as sugar beets and sun flowers are produced. Poultry husbandry is another economic activity. An activity of lesser importance is perch and carp fishing.
