= Kozluören =

Kozluören can refer to:

- Kozluören, Azdavay
- Kozluören, Kestel
