= List of municipalities in Çanakkale Province =

This is the List of municipalities in Çanakkale Province, Turkey as of March 2023.

| District | Municipality |
|---|---|
| Ayvacık | Ayvacık |
| Ayvacık | Küçükkuyu |
| Bayramiç | Bayramiç |
| Biga | Biga |
| Biga | Gümüşçay |
| Biga | Karabiga |
| Bozcaada | Bozcaada |
| Çan | Çan |
| Çan | Terzialan |
| Çanakkale | Çanakkale |
| Çanakkale | Kepez |
| Eceabat | Eceabat |
| Ezine | Ezine |
| Ezine | Geyikli |
| Gelibolu | Evreşe |
| Gelibolu | Gelibolu |
| Gelibolu | Kavakköy |
| Gökçeada | Gökçeada |
| Lapseki | Çardak |
| Lapseki | Lapseki |
| Lapseki | Umurbey |
| Yenice | Kalkım |
| Yenice | Yenice |
