= Beypınarı =

Beypınarı can refer to:

- Beypınarı, Lapseki
- Beypınarı, Saimbeyli
