= Nusretiye =

Nusretiye can refer to:

- Nusretiye Clock Tower
- Nusretiye Mosque
- Nusretiye, Lapseki
