= Doğandere =

Doğandere can refer to:

- Doğandere, Lapseki
- Doğandere, Nallıhan
- Doğandere, Refahiye
