= Suluca =

Suluca can refer to:

- Suluca, Keşan
- Suluca, Lapseki
- Suluca, Muş
- Suluca, Sarıçam
