= Dumanlı, Lapseki =

Village in Turkey

Dumanlı
- Village
- Location in Turkey Dumanlı (Marmara)
- Coordinates: 40°15′41″N 26°53′42″E
- Country: Turkey
- Province: Çanakkale
- District: Lapseki
- Population (2021): 170
- Time zone: UTC+3 (TRT)

Dumanlı is a village in the Lapseki District of Çanakkale Province in Turkey. Its population is 170 (2021).
