= Kanlıdağ, Azdavay =

Village in Turkey

Kanlıdağ
- Village
- Location in Turkey
- Coordinates: 41°52′32″N 33°24′50″E
- Country: Turkey
- Province: Kastamonu
- District: Azdavay
- Population (2021): 86
- Time zone: UTC+3 (TRT)

Kanlıdağ is a village in the Azdavay District of Kastamonu Province in Turkey. Its population is 86 (2021).
