= Beyçayırı, Lapseki =

Village in Turkey

Beyçayırı
- Village
- Location in Turkey Beyçayırı (Marmara)
- Coordinates: 40.2556°N 26.9266°E
- Country: Turkey
- Province: Çanakkale
- District: Lapseki
- Population (2021): 144
- Time zone: UTC+3 (TRT)

Beyçayırı is a village in the Lapseki District of Çanakkale Province in Turkey. Its population is 144 (2021).
