= Aliköy, Azdavay =

Village in Turkey

Aliköy
- Village
- Location within Turkey
- Coordinates: 41.823°N 33.363°E
- Country: Turkey
- Province: Kastamonu
- District: Azdavay
- Population (2021): 130
- Time zone: UTC+3 (TRT)

Aliköy is a village in the Azdavay District of Kastamonu Province in Turkey. Its population is 130 (2021).
