= Akçaalan, Lapseki =

Village in Turkey

Akçaalan
- Village
- Location in Turkey Akçaalan (Marmara)
- Coordinates: 40.2241°N 26.6991°E
- Country: Turkey
- Province: Çanakkale
- District: Lapseki
- Population (2021): 30
- Time zone: UTC+3 (TRT)

Akçaalan is a village in the Lapseki District of Çanakkale Province in Turkey. Its population is 30 (2021).
