= Sındal, Lapseki =

Village in Turkey

Sındal
- Village
- Location in Turkey Sındal (Marmara)
- Coordinates: 40°14′0″N 26°38′40″E
- Country: Turkey
- Province: Çanakkale
- District: Lapseki
- Population (2021): 56
- Time zone: UTC+3 (TRT)

Sındal is a village in the Lapseki District of Çanakkale Province in Turkey. Its population is 56 (2021). It has been referred to as Sındal, Zındal, Sindel, or Sendel by historical sources.
