= Karahalılılar, Azdavay =

Village in Turkey

Karahalılılar
- Village
- Location in Turkey
- Coordinates: 41.584°N 33.297°E
- Country: Turkey
- Province: Kastamonu
- District: Azdavay
- Population (2021): 62
- Time zone: UTC+3 (TRT)

Karahalılılar is a village in the Azdavay District of Kastamonu Province in Turkey. Its population is 62 (2021).
