= List of municipalities in Kilis Province =

This is the List of municipalities in Kilis Province, Turkey as of March 2023.

District	Municipality
Elbeyli	Elbeyli
Kilis	Kilis
Musabeyli	Musabeyli
Polateli	Polateli
