= Lapseki District =

District of Çanakkale Province, Turkey

- District
- Map showing Lapseki District in Çanakkale Province

- Location in Turkey Lapseki District (Marmara)
- Coordinates: 40°19′N 26°43′E
- Country: Turkey
- Province: Çanakkale
- Seat: Lapseki

Government
  - Kaymakam: Emre Öztürk
- Area: 821 km^{2} (317 sq mi)
- Population (2021): 28,742
  - Density: 35/km^{2} (91/sq mi)
- Time zone: UTC+3 (TRT)
- Website: www.lapseki.gov.tr

Lapseki District is a district of the Çanakkale Province of Turkey. Its seat is the town of Lapseki. Its area is 821 km^{2}, and its population is 28,742 (2021).

== Composition ==
There are three municipalities in Lapseki District:

- Çardak
- Lapseki
- Umurbey

There are 40 villages in Lapseki District:

- Adatepe
- Akçaalan
- Alpagut
- Balcılar
- Beybaş
- Beyçayırı
- Beypınarı
- Çamyurt
- Çataltepe
- Çavuşköy
- Dereköy
- Dişbudak
- Doğandere
- Dumanlı
- Ecialan
- Gökköy
- Güreci
- Hacıgelen
- Hacıömerler
- Harmancık
- İlyasköy
- Kangırlı
- Karamusalar
- Karaömerler
- Kemiklialan
- Kırcalar
- Kızıldam
- Kocabaşlar
- Kocaveli
- Mecidiye
- Nusretiye
- Sındal
- Subaşı
- Suluca
- Şahinli
- Şevketiye
- Taştepe
- Üçpınar
- Yaylalar
- Yenice
