= Azdavay District =

District of Kastamonu Province, Turkey

- District
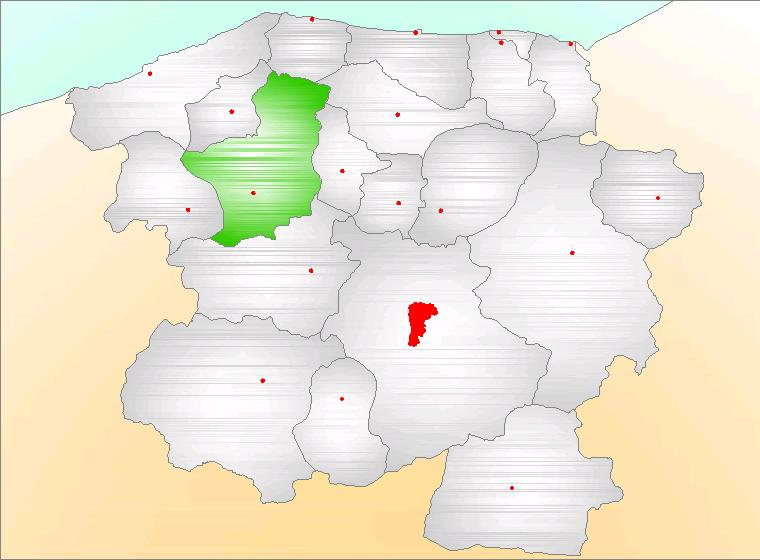
- Map showing Azdavay District (green) in Kastamonu Province

- Location in Turkey
- Coordinates: 41°39′N 33°18′E
- Country: Turkey
- Province: Kastamonu
- Seat: Azdavay

Government
  - Kaymakam: Şeyma Nur Kaygusuz
- Area: 759 km^{2} (293 sq mi)
- Population (2021): 7,290
  - Density: 9.60/km^{2} (24.9/sq mi)
- Time zone: UTC+3 (TRT)
- Website: www.azdavay.gov.tr

Azdavay District is a district of the Kastamonu Province of Turkey. Its seat is the town of Azdavay. Its area is 759 km^{2}, and its population is 7,290 (2021). It is bounded by Cide District to the north, Daday District to the south, Pınarbaşı District to the west, Küre District to the east and İnebolu District to the northeast. Due to the low level economic activity in the district, migration to bigger provinces such as Istanbul is prevalent, resulting in population decrease. In consequence, some rural areas are completely deserted, and some schools closed.

== Geography ==
Azdavay is in the western Black Sea region of Turkey, in the northwest part of the Kastamonu province. Its territory is mostly mountainous and covered with fertile forest areas. Its average elevation is 830 m, with the highest peaks reaching 1,300 m. Important streams are Devrekani entering the Black Sea, Valay and Gümürtler.

== Landmarks ==
Çatak Kanyonu (Chatak Canyon), Medil Cave, Aşıklar Köprüsü (Lovers Bridge), and Waterfall Palace are the most popular places and natural beauties in Azdavay district. Chatak Canyon is one of the largest of its kind in Turkey. Chatak Canyon has a glass terrace on top of it. The terrace is 450 metres high from the stream.

The most noteworthy locations in the district are the natural sites which include a 4 km long canyon on the Devrekani stream and the Medil Cavern in Karakuşlu. Some remains which have been identified as Roman have also been found. One of the customs specific to the district is the traditional wedding ceremony called "three-day", which is also worth observing.

== Climate ==
Due to the mountain range surrounding the district to the north, the Black Sea climate does not primarily dominate. The winters are quite harsh, and the summers are fairly hot, while precipitation starts to fall in autumn until April, often as snow. Temperatures might drop as low as −35 °C during winter, and rise as high as 40 °C in summer. Also day and night temperatures might differ greatly, which negatively affects agriculture (fruits and vegetables).

== Composition ==
There is one municipality in Azdavay District:

- Azdavay

There are 49 villages in Azdavay District:

- Ahat
- Akçaçam
- Alacık
- Aliköy
- Arslanca
- Bakırcı
- Başakçay
- Başören
- Çakıroğlu
- Çamlıbük
- Çoçukören
- Çömlektepe
- Derelitekke
- Dereyücek
- Evlek
- Gecen
- Göktaş
- Gültepe
- Gümürtler
- Hıdırlar
- Hocaköy
- Kanlıdağ
- Karahalılılar
- Karakuşlu
- Kayabaşı
- Kayaoğlu
- Kerpiçlik
- Kırcalar
- Kırmacı
- Kolca
- Kozluören
- Kurtçular
- Maden
- Maksutköy
- Mehmetçelebi
- Sabuncular
- Sada
- Samancı
- Sarayköy
- Sarnıçköy
- Sıraköy
- Söğütpınar
- Tasköy
- Tomrukköy
- Topuk
- Üyük
- Yeşilköy
- Yumacık
- Zümrüt
