= Maksutköy, Azdavay =

Village in Turkey

Maksutköy
- Village
- Location in Turkey
- Coordinates: 41°42′06″N 33°15′28″E
- Country: Turkey
- Province: Kastamonu
- District: Azdavay
- Population (2021): 70
- Time zone: UTC+3 (TRT)

Maksutköy is a village in the Azdavay District of Kastamonu Province in Turkey. Its population is 70 (2021).
