= Karaömerler, Lapseki =

Village in Turkey

Karaömerler
- Village
- Location in Turkey Karaömerler (Marmara)
- Coordinates: 40.2447°N 26.785°E
- Country: Turkey
- Province: Çanakkale
- District: Lapseki
- Population (2021): 133
- Time zone: UTC+3 (TRT)

Karaömerler is a village in the Lapseki District of Çanakkale Province in Turkey. Its population is 133 (2021).
