= Üçpınar, Lapseki =

Village in Turkey

Üçpınar
- Village
- Location in Turkey Üçpınar (Marmara)
- Coordinates: 40°09′11″N 26°42′51″E
- Country: Turkey
- Province: Çanakkale
- District: Lapseki
- Population (2021): 57
- Time zone: UTC+3 (TRT)

Üçpınar is a village in the Lapseki District of Çanakkale Province in Turkey. Its population is 57 (2021).
