= Kocaveli, Lapseki =

Village in Turkey

Kocaveli
- Village
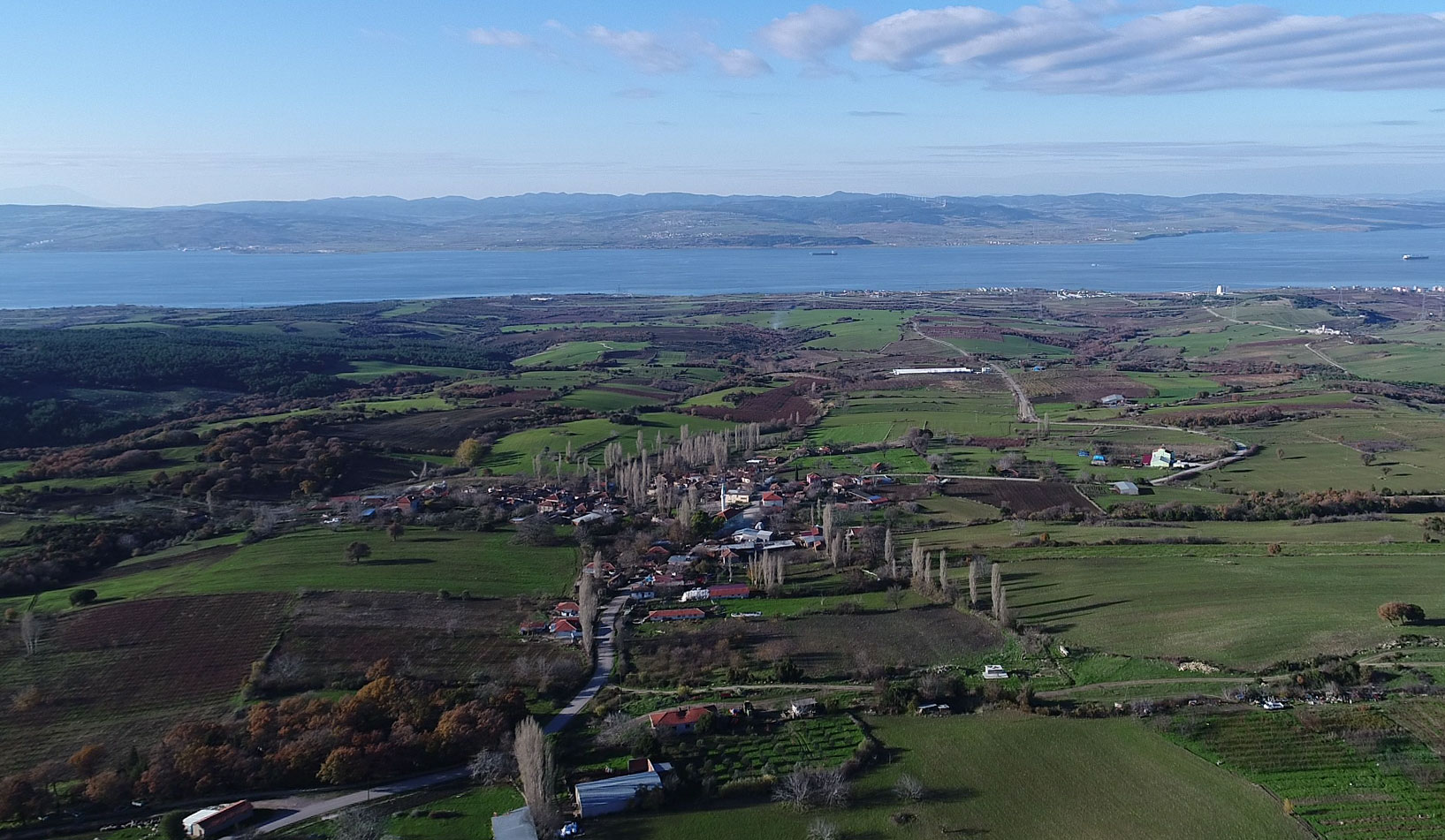

- Location within Turkey Location within Marmara
- Coordinates: 40°18′N 26°41′E
- Country: Turkey
- Province: Çanakkale
- District: Lapseki
- Population (2021): 104
- Time zone: UTC+3 (TRT)

Kocaveli is a village in the Lapseki District of Çanakkale Province in Turkey. Its population is 104 (2021).
