= Sulakyurt District =

District of Kırıkkale Province, Turkey

- District
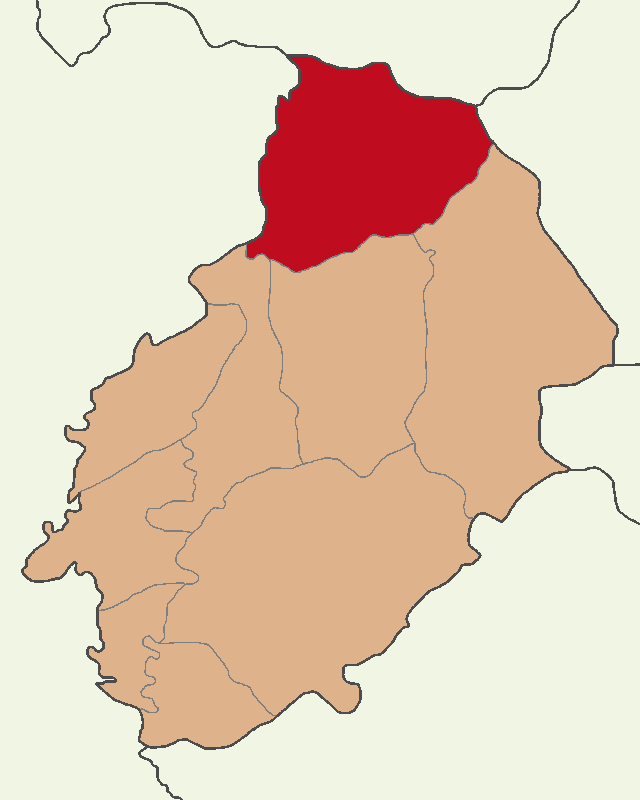
- Map showing Sulakyurt District in Kırıkkale Province

- Location in Turkey Sulakyurt District (Turkey Central Anatolia)
- Coordinates: 40°09′N 33°43′E
- Country: Turkey
- Province: Kırıkkale
- Seat: Sulakyurt

Government
  - Kaymakam: Kerem Tunçer
- Area: 708 km^{2} (273 sq mi)
- Population (2022): 6,106
  - Density: 8.6/km^{2} (22/sq mi)
- Time zone: UTC+3 (TRT)
- Website: www.sulakyurt.gov.tr

Sulakyurt District is a district of the Kırıkkale Province of Turkey. Its seat is the town of Sulakyurt. Its area is 708 km^{2}, and its population is 6,106 (2022).

== Composition ==
There is one municipality in Sulakyurt District:

- Sulakyurt

There are 26 villages in Sulakyurt District:

- Ağaylı
- Akkuyu
- Alişeyhli
- Amberdere
- Ayvatlı
- Çayoba
- Çevrimli
- Danacı
- Deredüzü
- Esenpınar
- Faraşlı
- Güzelyurt
- Hamzalı
- İmamoğluçeşmesi
- Kalekışla
- Kıyıhalilinceli
- Kıyıkavurgalı
- Koruköy
- Ortaköy
- Sarıkızlı
- Sarımbey
- Sofularçiftliği
- Yağbasan
- Yeniceli
- Yeşilli
- Yeşilyazı
