= Hacıömerler, Lapseki =

Village in Turkey

Hacıömerler
- Village
- Location in Turkey Hacıömerler (Marmara)
- Coordinates: 40.38098°N 26.77819°E
- Country: Turkey
- Province: Çanakkale
- District: Lapseki
- Population (2021): 46
- Time zone: UTC+3 (TRT)

Hacıömerler is a village in the Lapseki District of Çanakkale Province in Turkey. Its population is 46 (2021).
