= Alpagut, Lapseki =

Village in Turkey

Alpagut
- Village
- Location in Turkey Alpagut (Marmara)
- Coordinates: 40.3791°N 26.8212°E
- Country: Turkey
- Province: Çanakkale
- District: Lapseki
- Population (2021): 90
- Time zone: UTC+3 (TRT)

Alpagut is a village in the Lapseki District of Çanakkale Province in Turkey. Its population is 90 (2021).
