= Kemiklialan, Lapseki =

Village in Turkey

Kemiklialan
- Village
- Location in Turkey Kemiklialan (Marmara)
- Coordinates: 40°17′N 26°36′E
- Country: Turkey
- Province: Çanakkale
- District: Lapseki
- Population (2021): 131
- Time zone: UTC+3 (TRT)

Kemiklialan is a village in the Lapseki District of Çanakkale Province in Turkey. Its population is 131 (2021).
