= Balışeyh District =

District of Kırıkkale Province, Turkey

- District
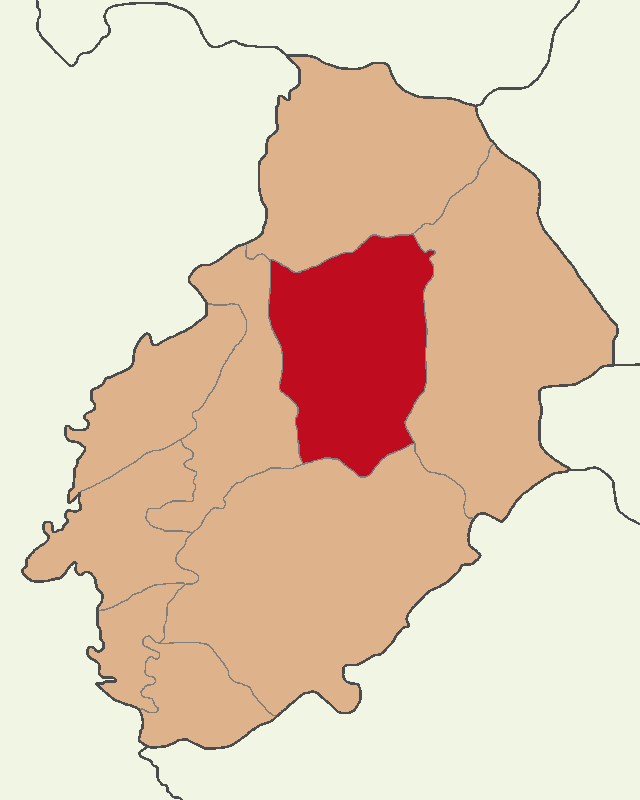
- Map showing Balışeyh District in Kırıkkale Province

- Location in Turkey Balışeyh District (Turkey Central Anatolia)
- Coordinates: 39°55′N 33°43′E
- Country: Turkey
- Province: Kırıkkale
- Seat: Balışeyh

Government
  - Kaymakam: Sançar Batuhan Kurdu
- Area: 623 km^{2} (241 sq mi)
- Population (2022): 5,857
  - Density: 9.40/km^{2} (24.3/sq mi)
- Time zone: UTC+3 (TRT)
- Website: www.baliseyh.gov.tr

Balışeyh District is a district of the Kırıkkale Province of Turkey. Its seat is the town of Balışeyh. Its area is 623 km^{2}, and its population is 5,857 (2022).

== Composition ==
There is one municipality in Balışeyh District:

- Balışeyh

There are 28 villages in Balışeyh District:

- Akçakavak
- Aşağıkarakısık
- Aydınşeyh
- Battalobası
- Beşbıçak
- Beyobası
- Bıyıkaydın
- Dikmen
- Eldelek
- Hıdırşeyh
- Hüseyinobası
- Işıklar
- İzzettinköy
- Karalı
- Kargın
- Kenanobası
- Kılevli
- Kırlangıç
- Koçubaba
- Kösedurak
- Kulaksız
- Mehmetbeyobası
- Selamlı
- Ulaklı
- Uzunlar
- Yenice
- Yenili
- Yukarıkarakısık
