= Bahşılı District =

District of Kırıkkale Province, Turkey

- District
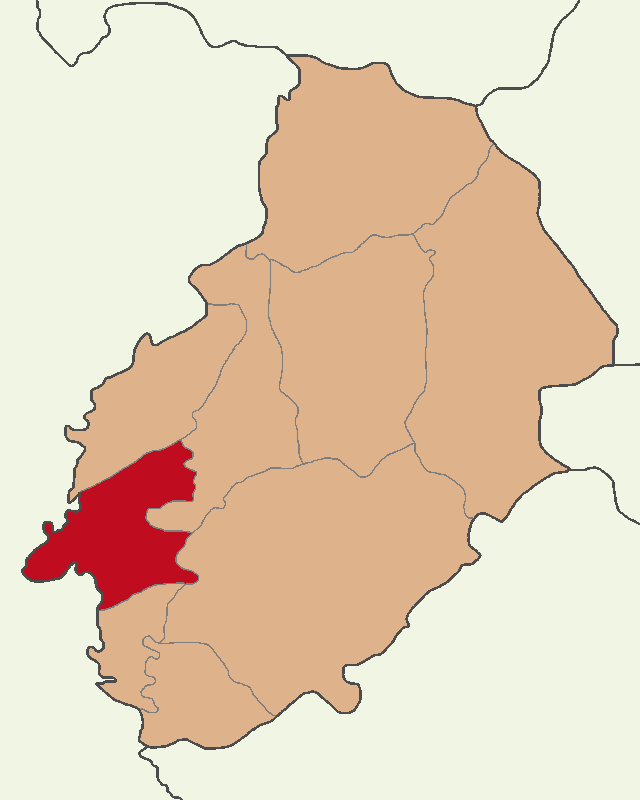
- Map showing Bahşılı District in Kırıkkale Province

- Location in Turkey Bahşılı District (Turkey Central Anatolia)
- Coordinates: 39°48′N 33°26′E
- Country: Turkey
- Province: Kırıkkale
- Seat: Bahşılı

Government
  - Kaymakam: Osman Beyazyıldız
- Area: 266 km^{2} (103 sq mi)
- Population (2022): 7,194
  - Density: 27/km^{2} (70/sq mi)
- Time zone: UTC+3 (TRT)
- Website: www.bahsili.gov.tr

Bahşılı District is a district of the Kırıkkale Province of Turkey. Its seat is the town of Bahşılı. Its area is 266 km^{2}, and its population is 7,194 (2022).

== Composition ==
There is one municipality in Bahşılı District:

- Bahşılı

There are 5 villages in Bahşılı District:

- Çamlıca
- Karaahmetli
- Küçüksarıkayalar
- Küreboğazı
- Sarıkayalar
