= Kangırlı, Lapseki =

Village in Turkey

Kangırlı
- Village
- Location in Turkey Kangırlı (Marmara)
- Coordinates: 40°14′N 26°35′E
- Country: Turkey
- Province: Çanakkale
- District: Lapseki
- Population (2021): 288
- Time zone: UTC+3 (TRT)

Kangırlı is a village in the Lapseki District of Çanakkale Province in Turkey. Its population is 288 (2021).
