= Taştepe, Lapseki =

Village in Turkey

Taştepe
- Village
- Country: Turkey
- Province: Çanakkale
- District: Lapseki
- Population (2021): 207
- Time zone: UTC+3 (TRT)

Taştepe is a village in the Lapseki District of Çanakkale Province in Turkey. Its population is 207 (2021).
