= Güreci, Lapseki =

Village in Turkey

Güreci
- Village
- Location in Turkey Güreci (Marmara)
- Coordinates: 40°22′N 26°56′E
- Country: Turkey
- Province: Çanakkale
- District: Lapseki
- Population (2021): 333
- Time zone: UTC+3 (TRT)

Güreci is a village in the Lapseki District of Çanakkale Province in Turkey. Its population is 333 (2021).
