= List of municipalities in Kastamonu Province =

This is the List of municipalities in Kastamonu Province, Turkey as of March 2023.

| District | Municipality |
|---|---|
| Abana | Abana |
| Ağlı | Ağlı |
| Araç | Araç |
| Azdavay | Azdavay |
| Bozkurt | Bozkurt |
| Çatalzeytin | Çatalzeytin |
| Cide | Cide |
| Daday | Daday |
| Devrekani | Devrekani |
| Doğanyurt | Doğanyurt |
| Hanönü | Hanönü |
| İhsangazi | İhsangazi |
| İnebolu | İnebolu |
| Kastamonu | Kastamonu |
| Küre | Küre |
| Pınarbaşı | Pınarbaşı |
| Şenpazar | Şenpazar |
| Seydiler | Seydiler |
| Taşköprü | Taşköprü |
| Tosya | Tosya |
