= Çamyurt, Lapseki =

Village in Turkey

Çamyurt
- Village
- Location in Turkey Çamyurt (Marmara)
- Coordinates: 40.2836°N 26.8397°E
- Country: Turkey
- Province: Çanakkale
- District: Lapseki
- Population (2021): 91
- Time zone: UTC+3 (TRT)

Çamyurt is a village in the Lapseki District of Çanakkale Province in Turkey. Its population is 91 (2021).
