= Hacıgelen, Lapseki =

Village in Turkey

Hacıgelen
- Village
- Location in Turkey Hacıgelen (Marmara)
- Coordinates: 40°11′N 26°44′E
- Country: Turkey
- Province: Çanakkale
- District: Lapseki
- Population (2021): 91
- Time zone: UTC+3 (TRT)

Hacıgelen is a village in the Lapseki District of Çanakkale Province in Turkey. Its population is 91 (2021).
