= Delice District =

District of Kırıkkale Province, Turkey

- District
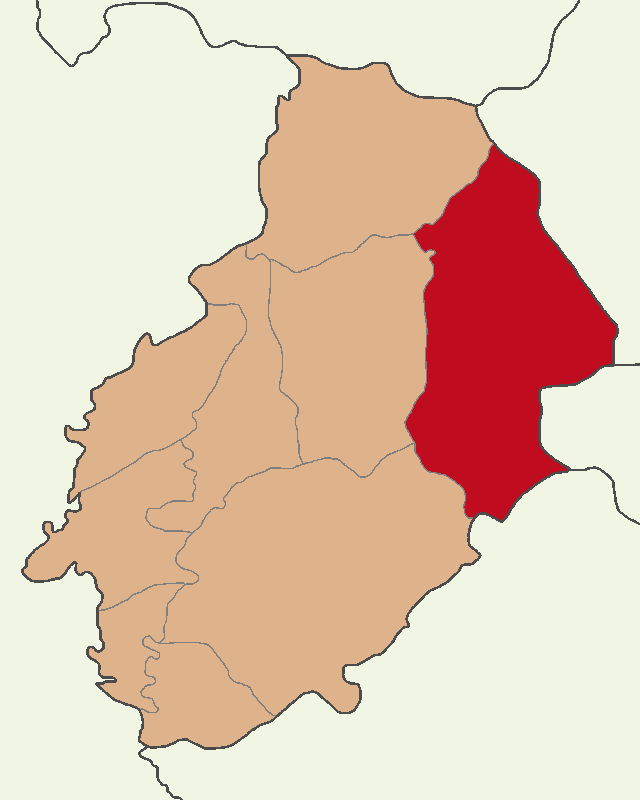
- Map showing Delice District in Kırıkkale Province

- Location in Turkey Delice District (Turkey Central Anatolia)
- Coordinates: 39°57′N 34°01′E
- Country: Turkey
- Province: Kırıkkale
- Seat: Delice

Government
  - Kaymakam: Muhammed Burak Akköz
- Area: 970 km^{2} (370 sq mi)
- Population (2022): 9,386
  - Density: 9.7/km^{2} (25/sq mi)
- Time zone: UTC+3 (TRT)
- Website: www.delice.gov.tr

Delice District is a district of the Kırıkkale Province of Turkey. Its seat is the town of Delice. Its area is 970 km^{2}, and its population is 9,386 (2022).

== Composition ==
There are two municipalities in Delice District:

- Çerikli
- Delice

There are 40 villages in Delice District:

- Akboğaz
- Alçılı
- Arbışlı
- Aşağıihsangazili
- Baraklı
- Bozköy
- Büyükafşar
- Büyükyağlı
- Çatallı
- Çatallıkarakoyunlu
- Çoğul
- Çongar
- Dağobası
- Derekışla
- Doğanören
- Elmalı
- Evliyalı
- Fadılobası
- Gözükızıllı
- Hacıobası
- Halitli
- Herekli
- İmirli
- Karaköseli
- Karpuz
- Kavakköy
- Kocabaş
- Küçükafşar
- Kurtoğlu
- Kuzayyurt
- Meşeyayla
- Ocakbaşı
- Şahçalı
- Sarıyaka
- Taşyazı
- Tatlıcak
- Tavaözü
- Tekkeköy
- Yaylayurt
- Yeniyapan
