= Bakırcı, Azdavay =

Village in Turkey

Bakırcı
- Village
- Location in Turkey
- Coordinates: 41°39′30″N 33°16′21″E
- Country: Turkey
- Province: Kastamonu
- District: Azdavay
- Population (2021): 73
- Time zone: UTC+3 (TRT)

Bakırcı is a village in the Azdavay District of Kastamonu Province in Turkey. Its population is 73 (2021).
