= Kırıkkale District =

District of Kırıkkale Province, Turkey

- District
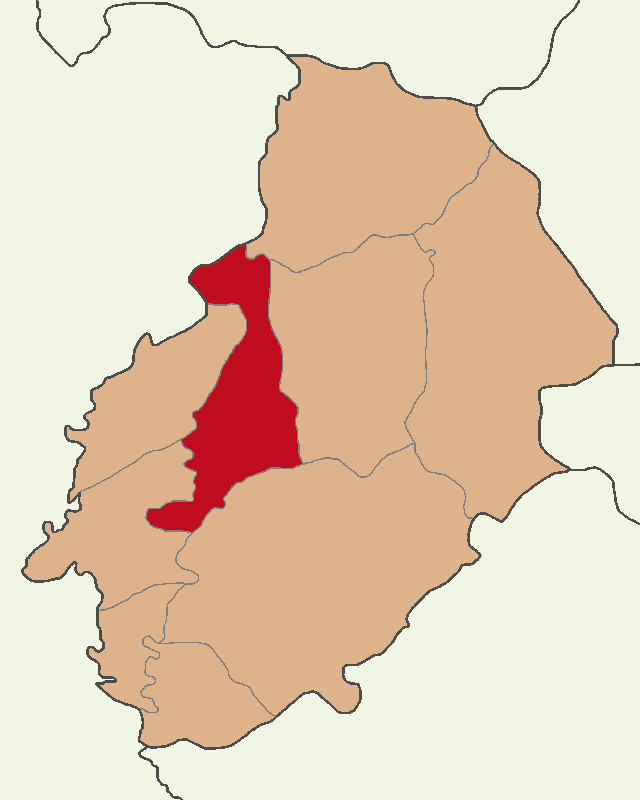
- Map showing Kırıkkale District in Kırıkkale Province

- Location in Turkey Kırıkkale District (Turkey Central Anatolia)
- Coordinates: 39°51′N 33°31′E
- Country: Turkey
- Province: Kırıkkale
- Seat: Kırıkkale
- Area: 432 km^{2} (167 sq mi)
- Population (2022): 193,954
  - Density: 450/km^{2} (1,200/sq mi)
- Time zone: UTC+3 (TRT)

Kırıkkale District (also: Merkez, meaning "central" in Turkish) is a district of the Kırıkkale Province of Turkey. Its seat is the city of Kırıkkale. Its area is 432 km^{2}, and its population is 193,954 (2022).

== Composition ==
There are two municipalities in Kırıkkale District:

- Hacılar
- Kırıkkale

There are 9 villages in Kırıkkale District:

- Ahılı
- Dağevi
- Hasandede
- Karacaali
- Kazmaca
- Kızıldere
- Pazarcık
- Ulaş
- Yukarımahmutlar
