= Şevketiye, Lapseki =

Village in Turkey

Şevketiye
- Village
- Country: Turkey
- Province: Çanakkale
- District: Lapseki
- Population (2021): 316
- Time zone: UTC+3 (TRT)

Şevketiye is a village in the Lapseki District of Çanakkale Province in Turkey. Its population is 316 (2021).
