= Adatepe, Lapseki =

Village in Turkey

Adatepe
- Village
- Location in Turkey Adatepe (Marmara)
- Coordinates: 40.3951°N 26.7910°E
- Country: Turkey
- Province: Çanakkale
- District: Lapseki
- Population (2021): 1,113
- Time zone: UTC+3 (TRT)

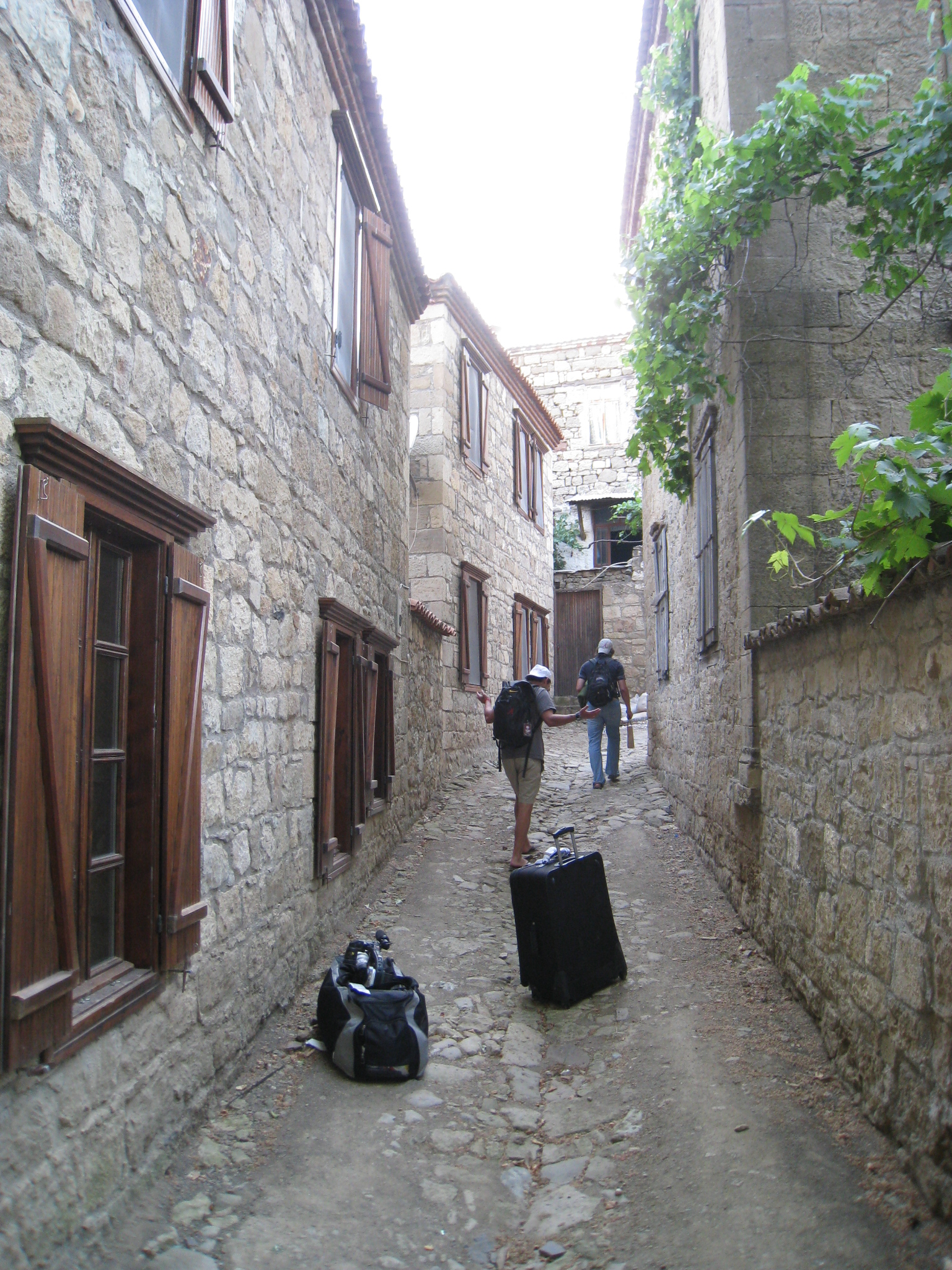
The village of Adatepe, Turkey

Adatepe is a village in the Lapseki District of Çanakkale Province in Turkey. Its population is 1,113 (2021).
