= Keskin District =

District of Kırıkkale Province, Turkey

- District
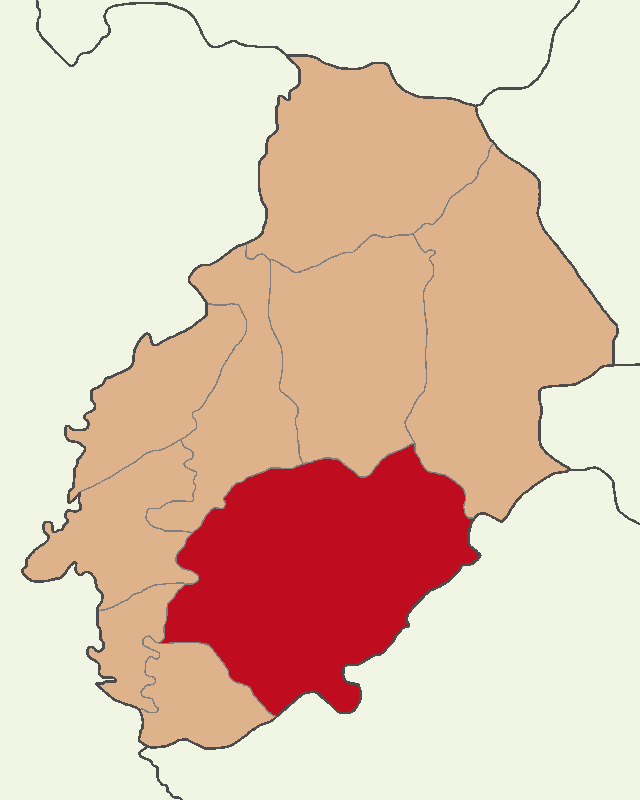
- Map showing Keskin District in Kırıkkale Province

- Location in Turkey Keskin District (Turkey Central Anatolia)
- Coordinates: 39°40′N 33°36′E
- Country: Turkey
- Province: Kırıkkale
- Seat: Keskin

Government
  - Kaymakam: Tunahan Çil
- Area: 15,637 km^{2} (6,037 sq mi)
- Population (2022): 33,659
  - Density: 2.2/km^{2} (5.6/sq mi)
- Time zone: UTC+3 (TRT)
- Website: www.keskin.gov.tr

Keskin District is a district of the Kırıkkale Province of Turkey. Its seat is the town of Keskin. Its area is 1,129 km^{2}, and its population is 15,637 (2022).

== Composition ==
There is one municipality in Keskin District:

- Keskin

There are 55 villages in Keskin District:

- Armutlu
- Aşağışeyh
- Barak
- Barakobası
- Beşler
- Büyükceceli
- Cabatobası
- Çalış
- Çamurabatmaz
- Cankurtaran
- Cebrailli
- Ceritkale
- Ceritmüminli
- Ceritobası
- Cinali
- Çipideresi
- Dağsolaklısı
- Danacıobası
- Efendiköy
- Eminefendi
- Eroğlu
- Esatmüminli
- Eskialibudak
- Gazibeyli
- Göçbeyli
- Göktaş
- Gülkonak
- Hacıaliobası
- Hacıömersolaklısı
- Haydardede
- İnziloğlu
- Kaçakköy
- Karafakılı
- Kasımağa
- Kavlak
- Kavurgalı
- Kayalaksolaklısı
- Kevenli
- Konur
- Konurhacıobası
- Köprüköy
- Kurşunkaya
- Kuzugüdenli
- Müsellim
- Olunlu
- Ortasöken
- Polatyurdu
- Seyifli
- Takazlı
- Turhanlı
- Üçevler
- Üçkuyu
- Yenialibudak
- Yeniyapan
- Yoncalı
