= Beybaş, Lapseki =

Village in Turkey

Beybaş
- Village
- Location in Turkey Beybaş (Marmara)
- Coordinates: 40°13′N 26°40′E
- Country: Turkey
- Province: Çanakkale
- District: Lapseki
- Population (2021): 144
- Time zone: UTC+3 (TRT)

Beybaş is a village in the Lapseki District of Çanakkale Province in Turkey. Its population is 144 (2021).
