= Kaymakam Kürşat Ağca, Polateli =

Village in Gaziantep Province, Turkey

Kaymakam Kürşat Ağca
- Neighbourhood
- Location in Turkey
- Coordinates: 36°51′4″N 37°10′16″E
- Country: Turkey
- Province: Kilis
- District: Polateli
- Municipality: Polateli
- Population (2022): 165
- Time zone: UTC+3 (TRT)

Kaymakam Kürşat Ağca, historically Mağaracık, is a neighbourhood of the town Polateli, Polateli District, Kilis Province, Turkey. Its population is 165 (2022).

In late 19th century, German orientalist Martin Hartmann listed the village as a settlement of 7 houses inhabited by Turks.
