= Balcılar, Lapseki =

Village in Turkey

Balcılar
- Village
- Location in Turkey Balcılar (Marmara)
- Coordinates: 40.1690°N 26.8392°E
- Country: Turkey
- Province: Çanakkale
- District: Lapseki
- Population (2021): 189
- Time zone: UTC+3 (TRT)

Balcılar is a village in the Lapseki District of Çanakkale Province in Turkey. Its population is 189 (2021).
