= Ahat, Azdavay =

Village in Turkey

Ahat
- Village
- Location in Turkey
- Coordinates: 41.622°N 33.266°E
- Country: Turkey
- Province: Kastamonu
- District: Azdavay
- Population (2021): 41
- Time zone: UTC+3 (TRT)

Ahat is a village in the Azdavay District of Kastamonu Province in Turkey. Its population is 41 (2021).
