= Ecialan, Lapseki =

Village in Turkey

Ecialan
- Village
- Location in Turkey Ecialan (Marmara)
- Coordinates: 40°10′N 26°53′E
- Country: Turkey
- Province: Çanakkale
- District: Lapseki
- Population (2021): 182
- Time zone: UTC+3 (TRT)

Ecialan is a village in the Lapseki District of Çanakkale Province in Turkey. Its population is 182 (2021).
