= Çataltepe, Lapseki =

Village in Turkey

Çataltepe
- Village
- Country: Turkey
- Province: Çanakkale
- District: Lapseki
- Population (2021): 119
- Time zone: UTC+3 (TRT)

Çataltepe is a village in the Lapseki District of Çanakkale Province in Turkey. Its population is 119 (2021).
