= Yaylalar, Lapseki =

Village in Turkey

Yaylalar
- Village
- Location in Turkey Yaylalar (Marmara)
- Coordinates: 40°11′33″N 26°51′11″E
- Country: Turkey
- Province: Çanakkale
- District: Lapseki
- Population (2021): 85
- Time zone: UTC+3 (TRT)

Yaylalar is a village in the Lapseki District of Çanakkale Province in Turkey. Its population is 85 (2021).
