= Göktaş, Azdavay =

Village in Turkey

Göktaş
- Village
- Location in Turkey
- Coordinates: 41°51′14″N 33°20′29″E
- Country: Turkey
- Province: Kastamonu
- District: Azdavay
- Population (2021): 80
- Time zone: UTC+3 (TRT)

Göktaş is a village in the Azdavay District of Kastamonu Province in Turkey. Its population is 80 (2021).
