= Çakıroğlu, Azdavay =

Village in Turkey

Çakıroğlu
- Village
- Location in Turkey
- Coordinates: 41°42′26″N 33°28′54″E
- Country: Turkey
- Province: Kastamonu
- District: Azdavay
- Population (2021): 71
- Time zone: UTC+3 (TRT)

Çakıroğlu is a village in the Azdavay District of Kastamonu Province in Turkey. Its population is 71 (2021).
