= Harmancık, Lapseki =

Village in Turkey

Harmancık
- Village
- Country: Turkey
- Province: Çanakkale
- District: Lapseki
- Population (2021): 101
- Time zone: UTC+3 (TRT)

Harmancık is a village in the Lapseki District of Çanakkale Province in Turkey. Its population is 101 (2021).
