= Subaşı, Lapseki =

Village in Turkey

Subaşı
- Village
- Country: Turkey
- Province: Çanakkale
- District: Lapseki
- Population (2021): 193
- Time zone: UTC+3 (TRT)

Subaşı is a village in the Lapseki District of Çanakkale Province in Turkey. Its population is 193 (2021).
