= Mecidiye, Lapseki =

Village in Turkey

Mecidiye
- Village
- Country: Turkey
- Province: Çanakkale
- District: Lapseki
- Population (2021): 188
- Time zone: UTC+3 (TRT)

Mecidiye is a village in the Lapseki District of Çanakkale Province in Türkiye. Its population is 188 (2021).
