= List of municipalities in Batman Province =

This is the List of municipalities in Batman Province, Turkey as of January 2023.

District	Municipality
Batman	Balpınar
Batman	Batman
Beşiri	Beşiri
Beşiri	İkiköprü
Gercüş	Gercüş
Gercüş	Kayapınar
Hasankeyf	Hasankeyf
Kozluk	Bekirhan
Kozluk	Kozluk
Sason	Sason
Sason	Yücebağ
