= List of municipalities in Çankırı Province =

This is the List of municipalities in Çankırı Province, Turkey as of March 2023.

District	Municipality
Atkaracalar	Atkaracalar
Atkaracalar	Çardaklı
Bayramören	Bayramören
Çankırı	Çankırı
Çerkeş	Çerkeş
Çerkeş	Saçak
Eldivan	Eldivan
Ilgaz	Ilgaz
Kızılırmak	Kızılırmak
Korgun	Korgun
Kurşunlu	Kurşunlu
Orta	Dodurga
Orta	Orta
Orta	Yaylakent
Şabanözü	Şabanözü
Yapraklı	Yapraklı
