= List of municipalities in Amasya Province =

This is the List of municipalities in Amasya Province, Turkey as of January 2023.

District	Municipality
Amasya (Merkez)	Amasya
Amasya	Ziyaret
Göynücek	Göynücek
Gümüşhacıköy	Gümüşhacıköy
Hamamözü	Hamamözü
Merzifon	Merzifon
Suluova	Suluova
Taşova	Taşova
