= Azdavay =

- Municipality
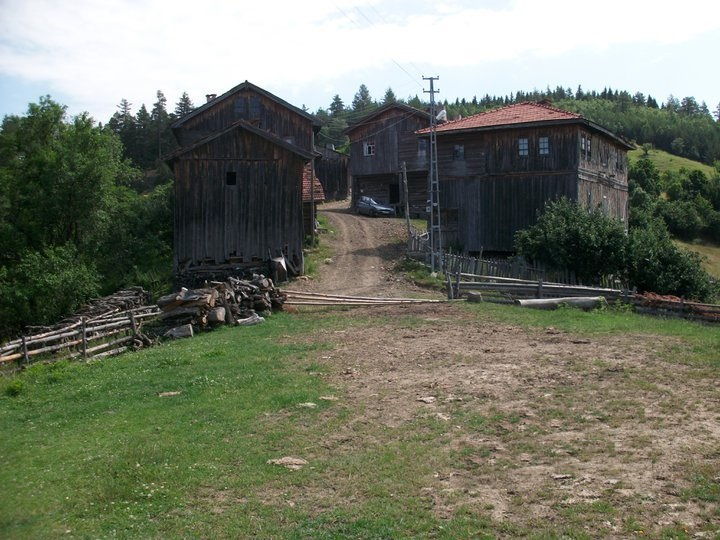
- Kizkayasi azdavay

- Location within Turkey
- Coordinates: 41°39′N 33°18′E
- Country: Turkey
- Province: Kastamonu
- District: Azdavay

Government
  - Mayor: Cevat Taşkan (MHP)
- Elevation: 855 m (2,805 ft)
- Population (2021): 3,227
- Time zone: UTC+3 (TRT)
- Area code: 0366
- Climate: Cfb
- Website: www.azdavay.bel.tr

Azdavay (formerly: Çarşamba) is a town in the Kastamonu Province in the Black Sea region of Turkey. It is located about 74 km away to the northwest of the province center Kastamonu. It is the seat of Azdavay District. Its population is 3,227 (2021). Its elevation is 855 m (2,805 ft).

== History ==
Archaeological findings hint that history of Azdavay reaches back to the Paphlagonians in 8th century BC. The region was dominated by the Hittites, Lydians, Persians, Hellenes, Pontus, Bithynians, Romans and the Byzantines in conjunction with the general historical timeline of the Kastamonu province. During the reign of the Jandarids, it was one of the 36 districts subject to the Kastamonu Sanjak. With the conquest of the region by the Ottoman sultan Mehmed II in 1460, Azdavay was annexed to the Ottoman Empire. In 1868, when the neighboring Daday was made a district of Kastamonu, Azdavay was attached to Daday as a town. After the proclamation of the Turkish republic, Azdavay was made a district in 1946, although by the secession of the towns Ağlı and Pınarbaşı in 1988, its population and land area largely decreased.

== Economy ==
Mining industry, ready-made textile manufacturing, forestry, livestock and some agriculture. Although there are some greenhouses, it does not have significant effect on overall economy.
