= Kapulukaya Dam =

- Interactive map of Kapulukaya Dam
- Location: Turkey
- Coordinates: 39.7301°N 33.4833°E
- Opening date: 1979

Dam and spillways
- Impounds: Kızılırmak River
- Height: 61 m (200 ft)

Reservoir
- Total capacity: 282,000,000 m^{3} (228,621 acre⋅ft)
- Surface area: 21 km^{2} (8 mi^{2})

Power Station
- Installed capacity: 54 MW
- Annual generation: 190 MW

Kapulukaya Dam is an embankment dam on the Kızılırmak River in Kırıkkale Province, Turkey. It opened in 1979. The dam's development was backed by the Turkish State Hydraulic Works.

== See also ==
- List of dams and reservoirs in Turkey
