= List of municipalities in Kars Province =

This is the List of municipalities in Kars Province, Turkey as of March 2023.

District	Municipality
Akyaka	Akyaka
Arpaçay	Arpaçay
Digor	Dağpınar
Digor	Digor
Kağızman	Kağızman
Kars	Kars
Sarıkamış	Sarıkamış
Selim	Selim
Susuz	Susuz
