= List of municipalities in Bayburt Province =

This is the List of municipalities in Bayburt Province, Turkey as of January 2023.

District	Municipality
Aydıntepe	Aydıntepe
Bayburt	Arpalı
Bayburt	Bayburt
Demirözü	Demirözü
Demirözü	Gökçedere
