= Çerikli =

- Municipality
- Location in Turkey Çerikli (Turkey Central Anatolia)
- Coordinates: 39°54′N 34°00′E
- Country: Turkey
- Province: Kırıkkale
- District: Delice
- Elevation: 680 m (2,230 ft)
- Population (2022): 2,000
- Time zone: UTC+3 (TRT)
- Postal code: 71670
- Area code: 0318

Çerikli is a town (belde) in the Delice District, Kırıkkale Province, Turkey. Its population is 2,000 (2022). It is situated on Turkish state highway D.220 and the railroad. The distance to Delice is 11 kilometres (6.8 mi) and to Kırıkkale is 64 kilometres (40 mi). According to town page the history of the settlement goes back to ancient ages. 11th-century Turkmen tribes were settled in Çerikli. After Seljuks of Turkey and Eretna domination, it was incorporated into Ottoman realm. In 1967 Çerikli was declared a seat of township. The main economic sector is agriculture. But animal breeding and light industry also play a role in town economy.
