= Hacılar, Kırıkkale =

Hacılar
- Municipality
- Location in Turkey Hacılar (Turkey Central Anatolia)
- Coordinates: 39°43′40″N 33°25′50″E
- Country: Turkey
- Province: Kırıkkale
- District: Kırıkkale
- Population (2022): 3,056
- Time zone: UTC+3 (TRT)

Hacılar is a town (belde) in the Kırıkkale District, Kırıkkale Province, Turkey. Its population is 3,056 (2022).
