= List of municipalities in Kocaeli Province =

This is the List of municipalities in Kocaeli Province, Turkey as of October 2007.

== Municipalities ==
List is sorted alphabetically A-Z, as Districts->Municipalities.

District	Municipality
Derince	Derince
Gebze	Çayırova
Gebze	Darıca
Gebze	Dilovası
Gebze	Gebze
Gebze	Şekerpınar
Gebze	Tavşancıl
Gölcük	Değirmendere
Gölcük	Gölcük
Gölcük	Halıdere
Gölcük	Hisareyn
Gölcük	İhsaniye
Gölcük	Ulaşlı
Gölcük	Yazlık
İzmit	Acısu
İzmit	Akmeşe
İzmit	Alikahya
İzmit	Arslanbey
İzmit	Bahçecik
İzmit	Bekirpaşa
İzmit	Büyükderbent
İzmit	Eşme
İzmit	Karşıyaka
İzmit	Köseköy
İzmit	Kullar
İzmit	Kuruçeşme
İzmit	Maşukiye
İzmit	Saraybahçe
İzmit	Sarımeşe
İzmit	Suadiye
İzmit	Uzunçiftlik
İzmit	Uzuntarla
İzmit	Yeniköy
İzmit	Yuvacık
Kandıra	Kandıra
Karamürsel	Akçat
Karamürsel	Dereköy
Karamürsel	Ereğli
Karamürsel	Karamürsel
Karamürsel	Kızderbent
Karamürsel	Yalakdere
Körfez	Hereke
Körfez	Kirazlıyalı
Körfez	Körfez

== Changes in 2014 ==
According to Law act no. 6360, belde (town) municipalities within provinces with more than 750,000 population (so called Metropolitan municipalities) were abolished as of 30 March 2014. 34 belde municipalities in the above list are now defunct. The list is kept for historical reference.
