= Beypınarı, Lapseki =

Village in Turkey

Beypınarı
- Village
- Location in Turkey Beypınarı (Marmara)
- Coordinates: 40.3064°N 26.9928°E
- Country: Turkey
- Province: Çanakkale
- District: Lapseki
- Population (2021): 46
- Time zone: UTC+3 (TRT)

Beypınarı is a village in the Lapseki District of Çanakkale Province in Turkey. Its population is 46 (2021).
