= List of municipalities in Artvin Province =

This is a list of municipalities in Artvin Province, Turkey as of January 2023.

District	Municipality
Ardanuç	Ardanuç
Arhavi	Arhavi
Artvin	Artvin
Borçka	Borçka
Hopa	Hopa
Kemalpaşa	Kemalpaşa
Murgul	Murgul
Şavşat	Şavşat
Yusufeli	Yusufeli
