= Kırcalar, Azdavay =

Village in Turkey

Kırcalar
- Village
- Location in Turkey
- Coordinates: 41°41′04″N 33°27′07″E
- Country: Turkey
- Province: Kastamonu
- District: Azdavay
- Population (2021): 96
- Time zone: UTC+3 (TRT)

Kırcalar is a village in the Azdavay District of Kastamonu Province in Turkey. Its population is 96 (2021).

== Geography ==
The village is 67 km away from Kastamonu city center and 17 km away from Azdavay district center.
