= Doğandere, Lapseki =

Village in Turkey

Doğandere
- Village
- Location in Turkey Doğandere (Marmara)
- Coordinates: 40.312°N 26.997°E
- Country: Turkey
- Province: Çanakkale
- District: Lapseki
- Population (2021): 54
- Time zone: UTC+3 (TRT)

Doğandere is a village in the Lapseki District of Çanakkale Province in Turkey. Its population is 54 (2021).
