= Suluca, Lapseki =

Village in Turkey

Suluca
- Village
- Location within Turkey Location within Marmara
- Country: Turkey
- Province: Çanakkale
- District: Lapseki
- Population (2021): 275
- Time zone: UTC+3 (TRT)

Suluca is a village in the Lapseki District of Çanakkale Province in Turkey. Its population is 275 (2021).
