= List of municipalities in Kırşehir Province =

This is the List of municipalities in Kırşehir Province, Turkey as of March 2023.

District	Municipality
Akçakent	Akçakent
Akpınar	Akpınar
Boztepe	Boztepe
Çiçekdağı	Çiçekdağı
Çiçekdağı	Köseli
Kaman	Kaman
Kaman	Kurancılı
Kırşehir	Kırşehir
Kırşehir	Özbağ
Mucur	Mucur
