= Çelebi District =

District of Kırıkkale Province, Turkey

- District
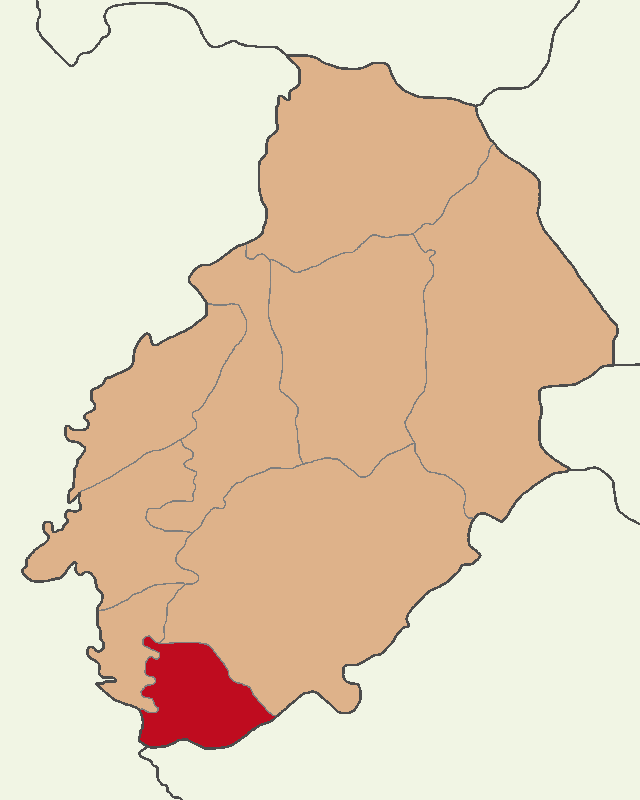
- Map showing Çelebi District in Kırıkkale Province

- Location in Turkey Çelebi District (Turkey Central Anatolia)
- Coordinates: 39°28′N 33°31′E
- Country: Turkey
- Province: Kırıkkale
- Seat: Çelebi

Government
  - Kaymakam: Mehmet Soylu
- Area: 223 km^{2} (86 sq mi)
- Population (2022): 2,304
  - Density: 10/km^{2} (27/sq mi)
- Time zone: UTC+3 (TRT)
- Website: www.celebi.gov.tr

Çelebi District is a district of the Kırıkkale Province of Turkey. Its seat is the town of Çelebi. Its area is 223 km^{2}, and its population is 2,304 (2022).

== Composition ==
There is one municipality in Çelebi District:

- Çelebi

There are 13 villages in Çelebi District:

- Alcıyeniyapan
- Hacıyusuflu
- Halildede
- İğdebeli
- Kaldırım
- Karaağaç
- Karaağıl
- Karabucak
- Karahacılı
- Karayakup
- Kepirli
- Tilkiliköy
- Yukarışıh
