= Delice =

- Municipality
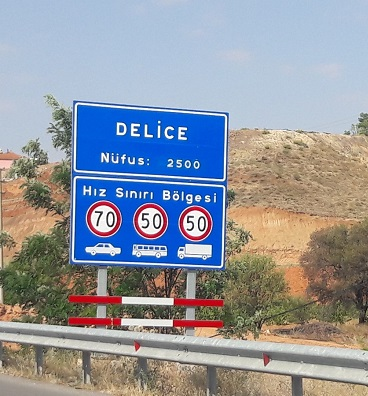

- Location within Turkey Location within Turkey Central Anatolia
- Coordinates: 39°57′N 34°01′E
- Country: Turkey
- Province: Kırıkkale
- District: Delice

Government
  - Mayor: Yılmaz Uyan (AKP)
- Elevation: 702 m (2,303 ft)
- Population (2022): 3,383
- Time zone: UTC+3 (TRT)
- Area code: 0318
- Climate: Csa
- Website: www.delice.bel.tr

Delice is a town in Kırıkkale Province in the Central Anatolia region of Turkey. It is the seat of Delice District. Its population is 3,383 (2022).
