= List of municipalities in Düzce Province =

This is the List of municipalities in Düzce Province, Turkey as of March 2023.

| District | Municipality |
|---|---|
| Akçakoca | Akçakoca |
| Cumayeri | Cumayeri |
| Çilimli | Çilimli |
| Düzce | Beyköy |
| Düzce | Boğaziçi |
| Düzce | Düzce |
| Gölyaka | Gölyaka |
| Gümüşova | Gümüşova |
| Kaynaşlı | Kaynaşlı |
| Yığılca | Yığılca |
