= Bahşılı =

- Municipality
- Location in Turkey Bahşılı (Turkey Central Anatolia)
- Coordinates: 39°48′45″N 33°28′18″E
- Country: Turkey
- Province: Kırıkkale
- District: Bahşılı

Government
  - Mayor: Halil Ibrahim Bişkin (MHP)
- Elevation: 689 m (2,260 ft)
- Population (2022): 6,045
- Time zone: UTC+3 (TRT)
- Area code: 0318
- Website: www.bahsili.bel.tr

Bahşılı is a town in Kırıkkale Province in the Central Anatolia region of Turkey. It is the seat of Bahşılı District. Its population is 6,045 (2022).
