= Polateli =

- Municipality
- Location in Turkey
- Coordinates: 36°50′32″N 37°08′04″E
- Country: Turkey
- Province: Kilis
- District: Polateli

Government
  - Mayor: Ali Koyuncu (CHP)
- Population (2022): 1,045
- Time zone: UTC+3 (TRT)
- Area code: 0348
- Website: www.polatelibelediyesi.bel.tr

Polateli, formerly Güldüzü and historically Ispanak, is a town and the administrative seat of the Polateli District in the Kilis Province of Turkey. Its population is 1,045 (2022). It is inhabited by Turkmens of the Çavuşlu tribe. It consists of 6 neighbourhoods: Atatürk, Cumhuriyet, Şehit Ali, Sosyal Konutlar, Ekrem Çetin and Kaymakam Kürşat Ağca.
