= List of municipalities in Ardahan Province =

This is the List of municipalities in Ardahan Province, Turkey as of January 2023.

District	Municipality
Ardahan	Ardahan
Çıldır	Çıldır
Damal	Damal
Göle	Göle
Göle	Köprülü
Hanak	Hanak
Posof	Posof
