= List of municipalities in Tunceli Province =

This is the List of municipalities in Tunceli Province, Turkey as of March 2023.

District	Municipality
Çemişgezek	Çemişgezek
Hozat	Hozat
Mazgirt	Akpazar
Mazgirt	Mazgirt
Nazımiye	Nazımiye
Ovacık	Ovacık
Pertek	Pertek
Pülümür	Pülümür
Tunceli	Tunceli
