= Karakeçili District =

District of Kırıkkale Province, Turkey

- District
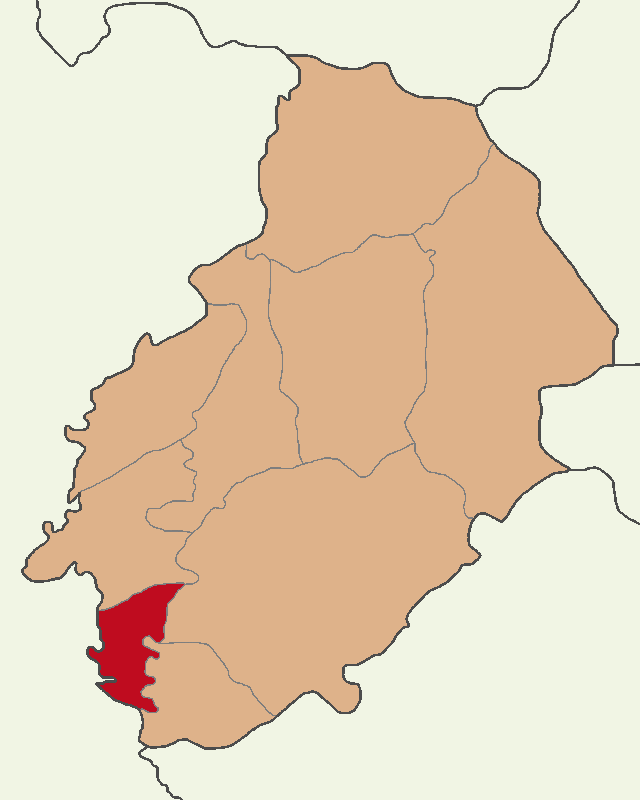
- Map showing Karakeçili District in Kırıkkale Province

- Location in Turkey Karakeçili District (Turkey Central Anatolia)
- Coordinates: 39°35′N 33°22′E
- Country: Turkey
- Province: Kırıkkale
- Seat: Karakeçili

Government
  - Kaymakam: Ali Can Uludağ
- Area: 137 km^{2} (53 sq mi)
- Population (2022): 2,949
  - Density: 22/km^{2} (56/sq mi)
- Time zone: UTC+3 (TRT)
- Website: www.karakecili.gov.tr

Karakeçili District is a district of the Kırıkkale Province of Turkey. Its seat is the town of Karakeçili. Its area is 137 km^{2}, and its population is 2,949 (2022).

== Composition ==
There is one municipality in Karakeçili District:

- Karakeçili

There are two villages in Karakeçili District:

- Akkoşan
- Sulubük
