= Kırcalar, Lapseki =

Village in Turkey

Kırcalar
- Village
- Country: Turkey
- Province: Çanakkale
- District: Lapseki
- Population (2021): 147
- Time zone: UTC+3 (TRT)

Kırcalar is a village in the Lapseki District of Çanakkale Province in Turkey. Its population is 147 (2021).
