= List of municipalities in Bilecik Province =

This is the list of municipalities in Bilecik Province, Turkey as of January 2023.

District	Municipality
Bilecik	Bayırköy
Bilecik	Bilecik
Bilecik	Vezirhan
Bozüyük	Bozüyük
Bozüyük	Dodurga
Gölpazarı	Gölpazarı
İnhisar	İnhisar
Osmaneli	Osmaneli
Pazaryeri	Pazaryeri
Söğüt	Söğüt
Yenipazar	Yenipazar
