= List of municipalities in Karabük Province =

This is the List of municipalities in Karabük Province, Turkey as of March 2023.

District	Municipality
Eflani	Eflani
Eskipazar	Eskipazar
Karabük	Karabük
Ovacık	Ovacık
Safranbolu	Safranbolu
Yenice	Yenice
Yenice	Yortan
