= Çelebi Island =

Island in Turkey

Native name: Çelebi Adası
- Location within Turkey

Geography
- Location: Aegean Sea
- Coordinates: 37°00′29″N 27°21′34″E
- Area: 0.1 km^{2} (0.039 sq mi)

Administration
- Turkey
- İl (province): Muğla Province
- İlçe: Bodrum

Çelebi Island is an Aegean island in Turkey.

The island at 37°00′29″N 27°21′34″E is a part of Bodrum ilçe (district) of Muğla Province. It is situated in the center of a gulf facing Bitez. Its distance to Bodrum is 7 kilometres (4.3 mi) Its area is about 0.1 kilometres (0.062 mi).

Recently, the visitors had brought five rabbits to the uninhabited island. Without a predator, the rabbits multiplied quickly and they began to threaten the plant cover of the island. Although the municipality tried to feed the rabbits they face the risk of starvation
