= List of municipalities in Bolu Province =

This is the List of municipalities in Bolu Province, Turkey as of January 2023.

District	Municipality
Bolu	Bolu
Bolu	Karacasu
Dörtdivan	Dörtdivan
Gerede	Gerede
Göynük	Göynük
Kıbrıscık	Kıbrıscık
Mengen	Gökçesu
Mengen	Mengen
Mudurnu	Mudurnu
Mudurnu	Taşkesti
Seben	Seben
Yeniçağa	Yeniçağa
