= List of municipalities in Çorum Province =

This is the List of municipalities in Çorum Province, Turkey as of March 2023.

District	Municipality
Alaca	Alaca
Bayat	Bayat
Boğazkale	Boğazkale
Çorum	Çorum
Çorum	Düvenci
Dodurga	Dodurga
İskilip	İskilip
Kargı	Kargı
Laçin	Laçin
Mecitözü	Mecitözü
Oğuzlar	Oğuzlar
Ortaköy	Aştavul
Ortaköy	Ortaköy
Osmancık	Osmancık
Sungurlu	Sungurlu
Uğurludağ	Uğurludağ
