= Sulakyurt =

- Municipality
- Location within Turkey Location within Turkey Central Anatolia
- Coordinates: 40°09′27″N 33°43′03″E
- Country: Turkey
- Province: Kırıkkale
- District: Sulakyurt

Government
  - Mayor: Seyfettin Çetiner (AKP)
- Elevation: 834 m (2,736 ft)
- Population (2022): 1,990
- Time zone: UTC+3 (TRT)
- Area code: 0318
- Climate: Csb
- Website: www.sulakyurt.bel.tr

Sulakyurt is a town in Kırıkkale Province in the Central Anatolia region of Turkey. It is the seat of Sulakyurt District. Its population is 1,990 (2022). Its elevation is 834 m (2,736 ft).
