= List of municipalities in Sinop Province =

This is the List of municipalities in Sinop Province, Turkey as of March 2023.

District	Municipality
Ayancık	Ayancık
Boyabat	Boyabat
Dikmen	Dikmen
Durağan	Durağan
Erfelek	Erfelek
Gerze	Gerze
Saraydüzü	Saraydüzü
Sinop	Sinop
Türkeli	Türkeli
