= Kozluören, Azdavay =

Village in Turkey

Kozluören
- Village
- Location in Turkey
- Coordinates: 41.744°N 33.367°E
- Country: Turkey
- Province: Kastamonu
- District: Azdavay
- Population (2021): 47
- Time zone: UTC+3 (TRT)

Kozluören is a village in the Azdavay District of Kastamonu Province in Turkey. Its population is 47 (2021).
