= Umurbey, Lapseki =

Umurbey
- Municipality
- Location in Turkey Umurbey (Marmara)
- Coordinates: 40°14′7″N 26°36′21″E
- Country: Turkey
- Province: Çanakkale
- District: Lapseki
- Population (2021): 2,377
- Time zone: UTC+3 (TRT)

Umurbey is a town (belde) in the Lapseki District, Çanakkale Province, Turkey. Its population is 2,377 (2021).
