= Çardak, Çanakkale =

Çardak
- Municipality
- Location in Turkey Çardak (Marmara)
- Coordinates: 40°23′N 26°43′E
- Country: Turkey
- Province: Çanakkale
- District: Lapseki
- Elevation: 10 m (30 ft)
- Population (2021): 3,705
- Time zone: UTC+3 (TRT)
- Postal code: 17810
- Area code: 0286

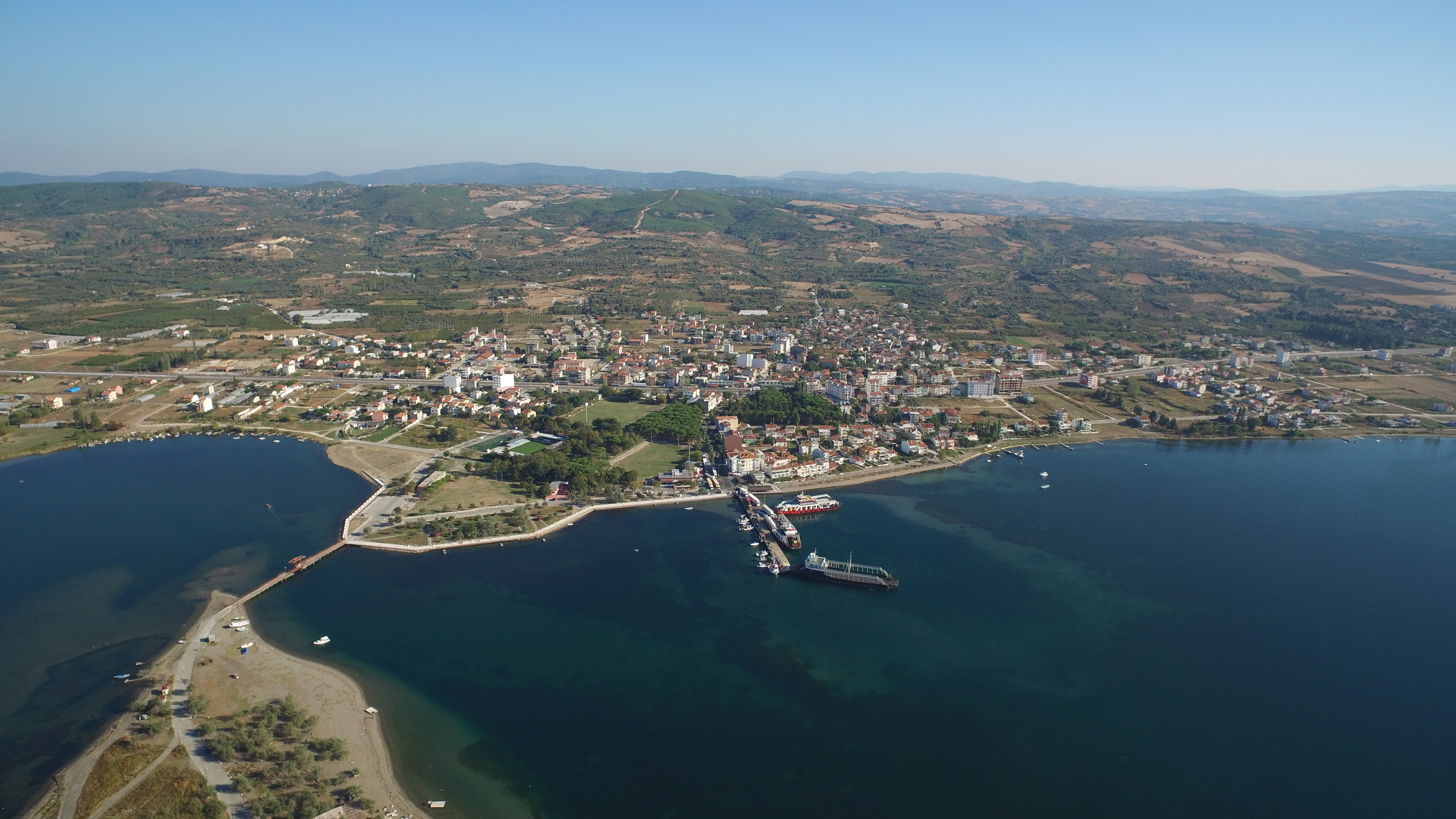

Çardak is a town (belde) in the Lapseki District, Çanakkale Province, Turkey. Its population is 3,705 (2021).

== Geography ==
Çardak is situated on the Anatolian coast of the Çanakkale (Dardanelles) Strait. It is north east of both Lapseki and Çanakkale, the distance to Lapseki is 4 kilometres (2.5 mi) and to Çanakkale is 37 kilometres (23 mi). It is also a ferry terminal to the Rumeli (European portion of Turkey).

== History ==
Çardak was founded by Turks in the 14th century as an Anatolian base for the early Ottoman operations in Rumeli. According to mayor's page the town was named by Süleyman Pasha who was the şehzade (prince) and the first Ottoman commander in Rumeli. The oldest buildings in the town belong to a complex (Turkish: Külliye) constructed by Gazi Yakup in 1479 (during the reign of Mehmet II) .

== Economy ==
Fishing and agriculture are the two main economic sectors of the town. Tourism is also promising. The beaches of the town are in Kum ada (a small sand island) just in front of Çardak.
