= Balışeyh =

- Municipality
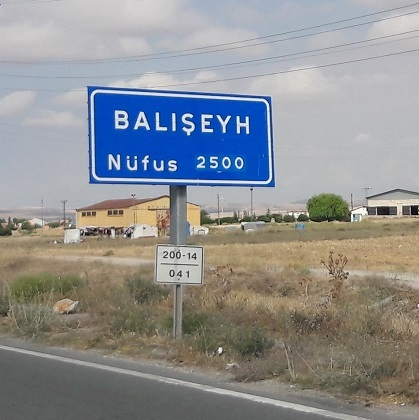

- Location within Turkey Location within Turkey Central Anatolia
- Coordinates: 39°55′N 33°43′E
- Country: Turkey
- Province: Kırıkkale
- District: Balışeyh

Government
  - Mayor: Savaş Akyüz (AKP)
- Elevation: 868 m (2,848 ft)
- Population (2022): 2,126
- Time zone: UTC+3 (TRT)
- Area code: 0318
- Website: www.baliseyh.bel.tr

Balışeyh is a town in Kırıkkale Province in the Central Anatolia region of Turkey. It is the seat of Balışeyh District. Its population is 2,126 (2022). Balışeyh is a historical town and thought to be built in the time of the Seljuks. Its elevation is of 868 m (2,848 ft).

== Name ==
The name "Balışeyh" comes from the famous Sufi Sheik Edebali, who was the mentor and father-in-law of Osman I, founder of the Ottoman Empire.
