= List of municipalities in Hakkâri Province =

This is the List of municipalities in Hakkâri Province, Turkey as of March 2023.

District	Municipality
Çukurca	Çukurca
Derecik	Derecik
Hakkari	Durankaya
Hakkâri	Hakkâri
Şemdinli	Şemdinli
Yüksekova	Büyükçiftlik
Yüksekova	Esendere
Yüksekova	Yüksekova
