= List of municipalities in Erzurum Province =

This is the List of municipalities in Erzurum Province, Turkey as of October 2007.

== Municipalities ==
List is sorted alphabetically A-Z, as Districts->Municipalities.

District	Municipality
Aşkale	Aşkale
Aşkale	Kandilli
Aşkale	Yeniköy
Çat	Çat
Çat	Yavi
Erzurum (Merkez)	Dadaşkent
Erzurum	Dadaşköy
Erzurum	Dumlu
Erzurum	Kazımkarabekir
Erzurum	Palandöken
Erzurum	Yakutiye
Hınıs	Halilçavuş
Hınıs	Hınıs
Horasan	Horasan
Ilıca	Ilıca
İspir	Çamlıkaya
İspir	İspir
İspir	Madenköprübaşı
Karaçoban	Karaçoban
Karaçoban	Kopal
Karayazı	Karayazı
Köprüköy	Köprüköy
Köprüköy	Yağan
Narman	Narman
Narman	Şekerli
Oltu	Oltu
Olur	Olur
Pasinler	Alvar
Pasinler	Pasinler
Pazaryolu	Pazaryolu
Şenkaya	Paşalı
Şenkaya	Şenkaya
Tekman	Tekman
Tortum	Bağbaşı
Tortum	Pehlivanlı
Tortum	Şenyurt
Tortum	Serdarlı
Tortum	Tortum
Uzundere	Uzundere

== Changes in 2014 ==
According to Law act no. 6360, belde (town) municipalities within provinces with more than 750,000 population (so called Metropolitan municipalities) were abolished as of 30 March 2014. 13 belde municipalities in the above list are now defunct. The list is kept for historical reference.
