= Keskin =

- Municipality
- Location within Turkey Location within Turkey Central Anatolia
- Coordinates: 39°40′23″N 33°36′49″E
- Country: Turkey
- Province: Kırıkkale
- District: Keskin

Government
  - Mayor: Council adminisration (AKP)
- Elevation: 1,180 m (3,870 ft)
- Population (2024): 16,265
- Time zone: UTC+3 (TRT)
- Postal code: 71800
- Area code: 0318
- Climate: Csb
- Website: www.keskin.bel.tr

Keskin is a town in Kırıkkale Province in the Central Anatolia region of Turkey. It is the seat of Keskin District. Keskin was elected from the AK Party in the 2024 Turkish Local Elections, with Ekmel Cönger serving as the mayor. According to the 2024 population census, the district's total population is 16,265. Its elevation is 1,123 m (3,684 ft).

== History ==
From 1867 until 1922, Keskin was part of Angora Vilayet.

== See also ==
- Once Upon a Time in Anatolia
