= Çelebi, Kırıkkale =

Town in Kırıkkale Province, Turkey

Çelebi
- Municipality
- Location within Turkey Location within Turkey Central Anatolia
- Coordinates: 39°28′N 33°31′E
- Country: Turkey
- Province: Kırıkkale
- District: Çelebi

Government
  - Mayor: Süleyman Uluyol (AKP)
- Elevation: 1,231 m (4,039 ft)
- Population (2022): 772
- Time zone: UTC+3 (TRT)
- Area code: 0318
- Climate: Csb

Çelebi is a town in Kırıkkale Province in the Central Anatolia region of Turkey. It is the seat of Çelebi District. Its population is 772 (2022).
