= Karakeçili =

- Municipality
- Location within Turkey Location within Turkey Central Anatolia
- Coordinates: 39°35′N 33°22′E
- Country: Turkey
- Province: Kırıkkale
- District: Karakeçili

Government
  - Mayor: Hüseyin Özçelik (AKP)
- Elevation: 714 m (2,343 ft)
- Population (2022): 2,692
- Time zone: UTC+3 (TRT)
- Area code: 0318
- Climate: Csa
- Website: www.karakecili.bel.tr

Karakeçili is a town in Kırıkkale Province in the Central Anatolia region of Turkey. It is the seat of Karakeçili District. Its population is 2,692 (2022). Its elevation is 838 m (2,749 ft).

== See also ==
- Karakeçili (tribe)
