= Kırıkkale =

- Municipality
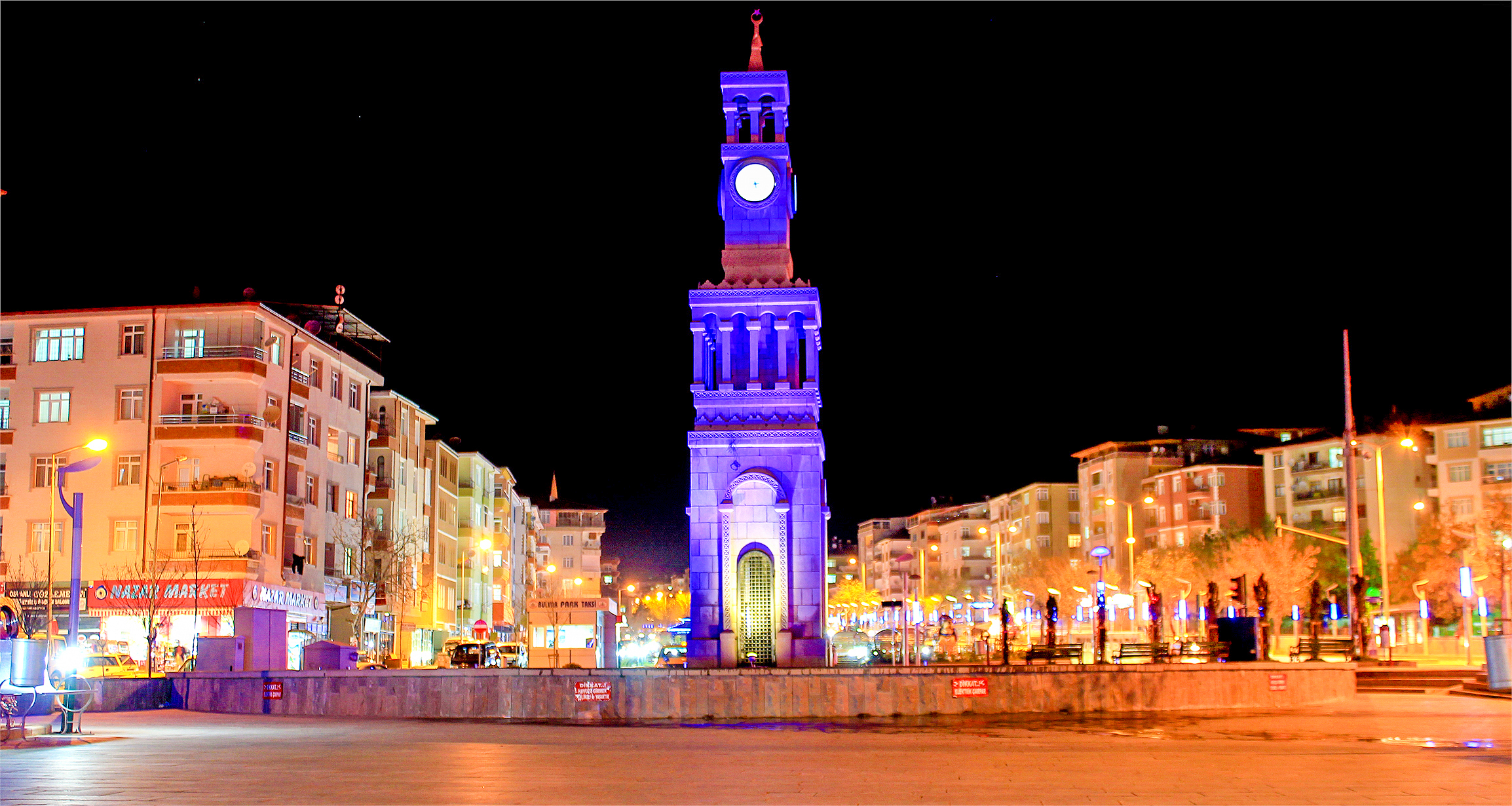
- Clock Tower in Kırıkkale

- Location within Turkey Location within Turkey Central Anatolia
- Coordinates: 39°50′24″N 33°30′19″E
- Country: Turkey
- Province: Kırıkkale
- District: Kırıkkale

Government
  - Mayor: Ahmet Önal (CHP)
- Population (2022): 186,960
- Time zone: UTC+3 (TRT)
- Postal code: 71000
- Area code: 0318
- Website: www.kirikkale.bel.tr

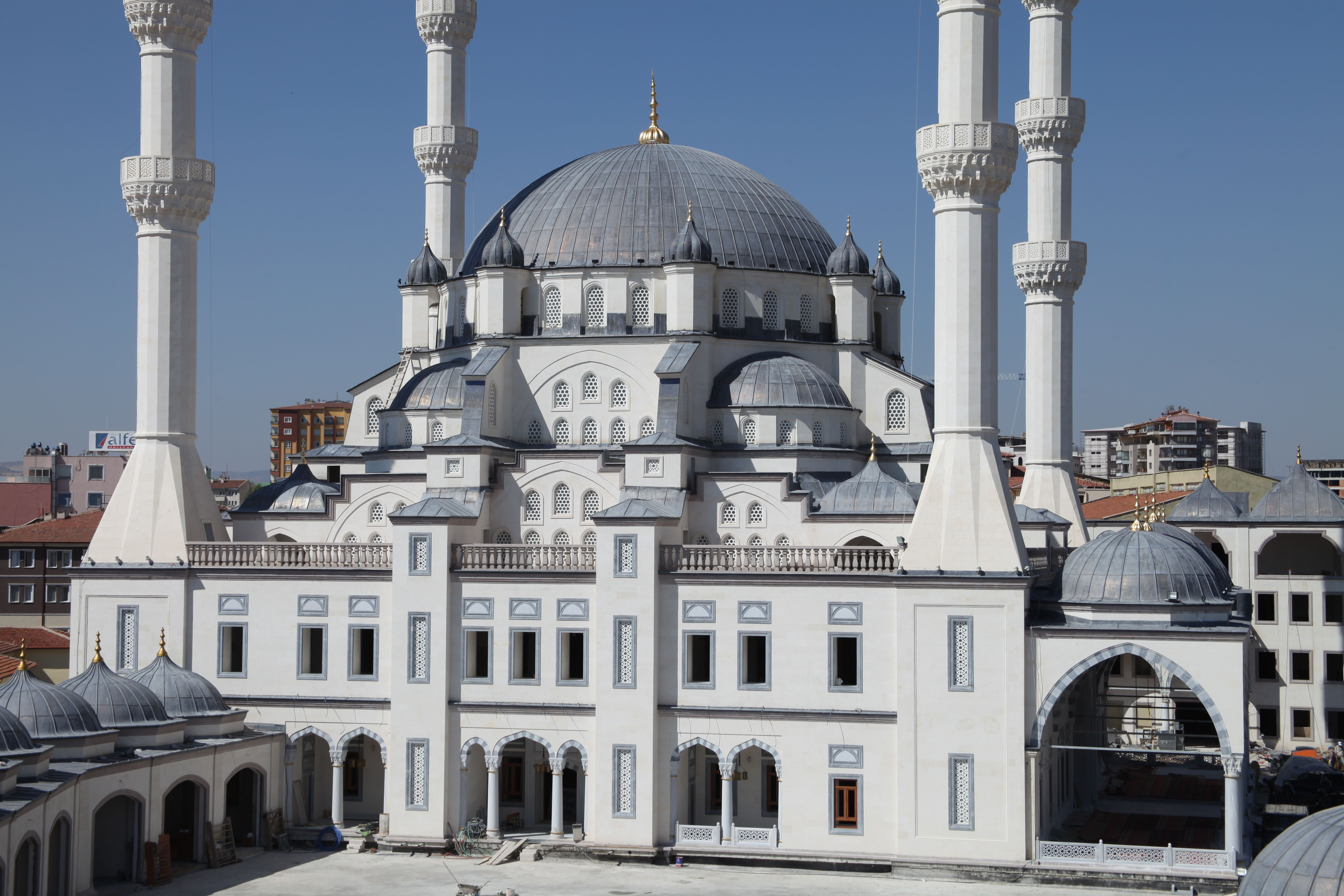
Kırıkkale Square Nur Mosque

Kırıkkale is a city in the Central Anatolia region of Turkey. It is the seat of Kırıkkale Province and Kırıkkale District. Its population is 186,960 (2022). It is located 80 km east of Ankara, the capital city of Turkey. The name of the city means broken castle.

The town of Kırıkkale is located on the Ankara-Kayseri railway near the Kızılırmak River in central Turkey. Formerly a village, it owes its rapid rise in population mainly to the establishment of steel mills in the 1950s. These works, among the largest in the country, specialize in high-quality alloy steel and machinery. In the 1960s, chemical plants were added and in 1986, the Tüpraş Kırıkkale Oil Refinery was established.

== History ==
Perhaps formerly known as Sarmalius in antiquity, the name of the city supposedly comes from the name "Kırık" a village 3 km north of the city combined with another name called "Kale", meaning castle, in the centre of the city, the two were put together to make 'Kırıkkale'. Kırıkkale in Turkish means "broken castle". Inhabitation began in the 16th century when Turkish tribes came from the east and settled in Central Anatolia. Formerly part of Ankara Province, it became the seat of the new Kırıkkale Province in 1989.

== Geography ==
Kırıkkale lies near Kızılırmak River (translating to Red River) in the Central Anatolia region of Turkey. The river water irrigates land that produces rice for the Turkish economy. The natural vegetation is steppe type, and vineyards are found in abundance.

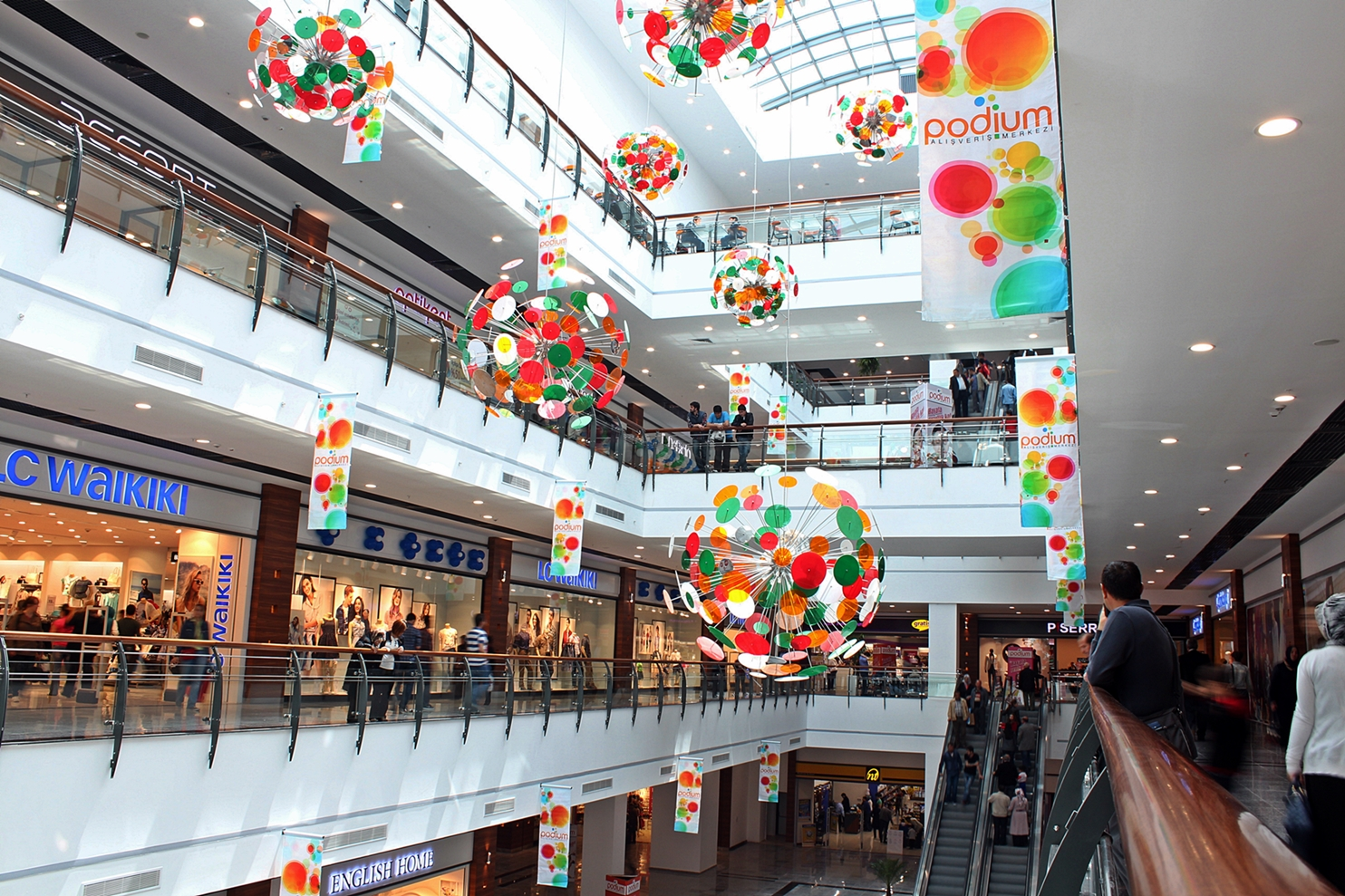
Shopping Mall in Kırıkkale

=== Climate ===
Kırıkkale has a cold semi-arid climate (Köppen: BSk) or a continental climate (Trewartha: Dc). Winters are cold and moderately snowy, whereas summers are hot and dry. Rainfall is most common during spring and autumn.

Highest recorded temperature:42.0 °C (107.6 °F) on 15 August 2023
Lowest recorded temperature:−22.4 °C (−8.3 °F) on 16 January 1980.

Climate data for Kırıkkale (1991–2020, extremes 1963–2023)
Month	Jan	Feb	Mar	Apr	May	Jun	Jul	Aug	Sep	Oct	Nov	Dec	Year
Record high °C (°F)	18.0 (64.4)	21.4 (70.5)	30.4 (86.7)	32.0 (89.6)	36.0 (96.8)	37.6 (99.7)	41.8 (107.2)	42.0 (107.6)	40.6 (105.1)	33.5 (92.3)	24.8 (76.6)	19.0 (66.2)	41.8 (107.2)
Mean daily maximum °C (°F)	4.7 (40.5)	7.8 (46.0)	13.2 (55.8)	18.7 (65.7)	23.8 (74.8)	28.2 (82.8)	31.8 (89.2)	31.9 (89.4)	27.7 (81.9)	21.4 (70.5)	13.0 (55.4)	6.3 (43.3)	19.0 (66.2)
Daily mean °C (°F)	0.8 (33.4)	2.7 (36.9)	7.2 (45.0)	12.2 (54.0)	17.1 (62.8)	21.4 (70.5)	24.9 (76.8)	24.9 (76.8)	20.3 (68.5)	14.4 (57.9)	7.0 (44.6)	2.4 (36.3)	12.9 (55.2)
Mean daily minimum °C (°F)	−2.4 (27.7)	−1.4 (29.5)	2.0 (35.6)	6.1 (43.0)	10.7 (51.3)	14.5 (58.1)	17.6 (63.7)	17.7 (63.9)	13.1 (55.6)	8.3 (46.9)	2.2 (36.0)	−0.6 (30.9)	7.3 (45.1)
Record low °C (°F)	−22.4 (−8.3)	−21.6 (−6.9)	−19.8 (−3.6)	−6.8 (19.8)	0.4 (32.7)	4.6 (40.3)	7.4 (45.3)	7.2 (45.0)	2.7 (36.9)	−5.0 (23.0)	−9.7 (14.5)	−18.0 (−0.4)	−22.4 (−8.3)
Average precipitation mm (inches)	42.8 (1.69)	30.2 (1.19)	39.1 (1.54)	40.0 (1.57)	50.2 (1.98)	42.3 (1.67)	9.6 (0.38)	14.4 (0.57)	15.0 (0.59)	29.1 (1.15)	30.6 (1.20)	43.6 (1.72)	386.9 (15.23)
Average precipitation days	11.57	9.93	11.03	11.87	13.37	9.83	3.50	3.57	4.73	7.50	8.00	11.27	106.2
Average relative humidity (%)	80.0	72.8	64.5	60.7	59.1	54.6	47.4	47.3	50.9	61.5	71.4	80.0	62.3
Mean monthly sunshine hours	82.2	121.5	171.2	214.6	270.8	311.7	358.5	338.4	265.9	206.5	139.8	74.3	2,556.9
Mean daily sunshine hours	2.7	4.3	5.5	7.2	8.7	10.4	11.6	10.9	8.9	6.7	4.7	2.4	7.0
Source 1: Turkish State Meteorological Service
Source 2: NOAA (humidity, sun 1991-2020)

== Education ==
Kırıkkale University is located in the city.
