= Kırıkkale Province =

Coordinates: 39°52′11″N 33°42′58″E

Kırıkkale Province Kırıkkale ili
- Province
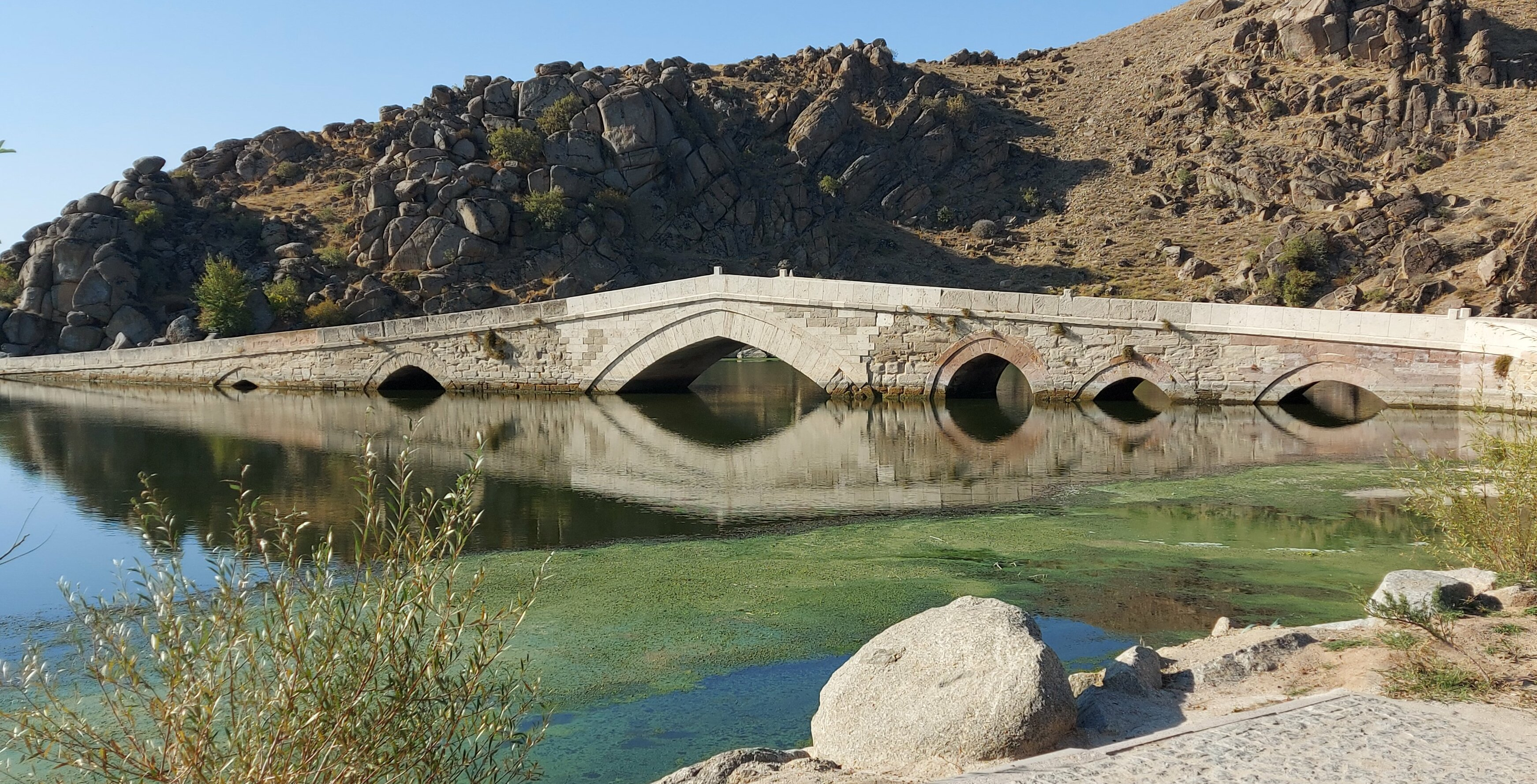
- Çeşnigir Bridge

- Location of the province within Turkey
- Country: Turkey
- Seat: Kırıkkale

Government
  - Governor: Hüseyin Engin Sarıibrahim
- Area: 4,791 km^{2} (1,850 sq mi)
- Population (2022): 277,046
  - Density: 57.83/km^{2} (149.8/sq mi)
- Time zone: UTC+3 (TRT)
- Area code: 0318
- Website: www.kirikkale.gov.tr

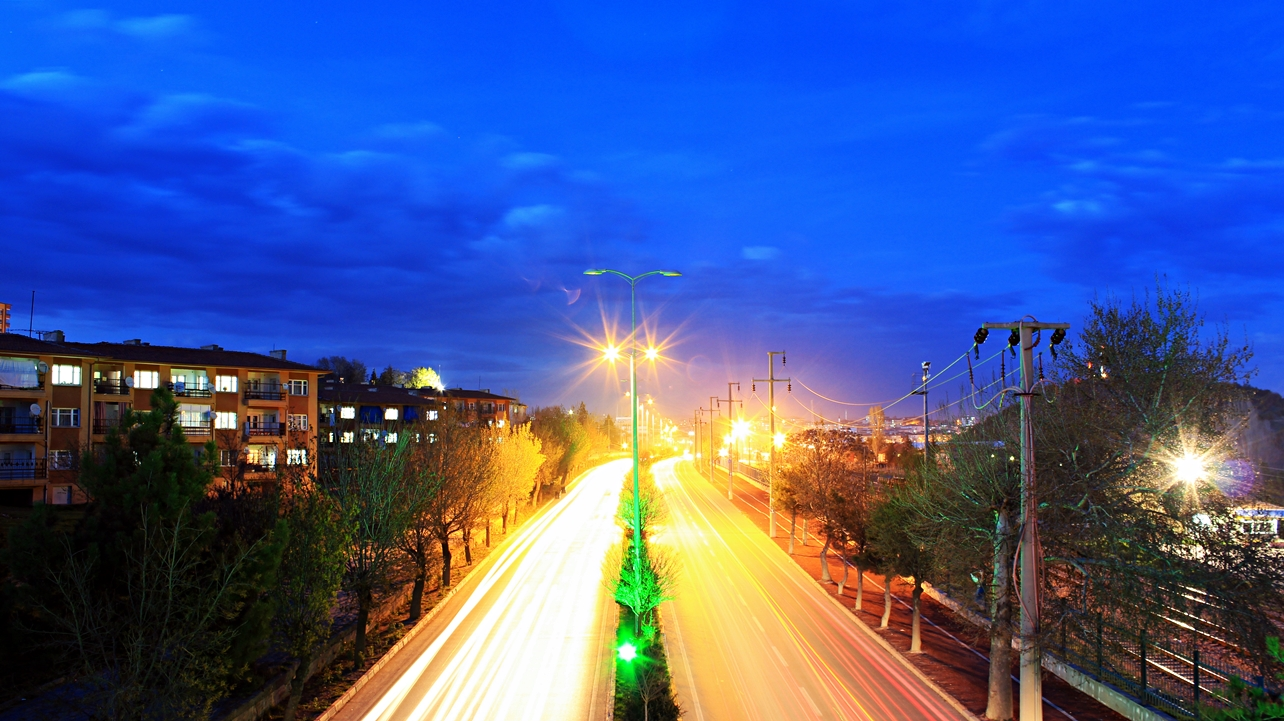
A view from Kırıkkale

Kırıkkale Province (Turkish: Kırıkkale ili) is a province of Turkey. It is located on the crossroads of major highways east of Ankara leading east to the Black Sea region. Its area is 4,791 km^{2}, and its population is 277,046 (2022). With its rapid population growth it has become an industrial center. The province was established in 1989 from part of Ankara Province. The provincial capital is Kırıkkale.

Kırıkkale is a rapidly growing town in central Turkey, on the Ankara-Kayseri railway near the Kızılırmak River. Formerly a village, it owes its rapid rise in population mainly to the establishment of steel mills in the 1950s. These works, among the largest in the country, specialize in high-quality alloy steel and machinery. In the 1960s chemical plants were added.

== Districts ==
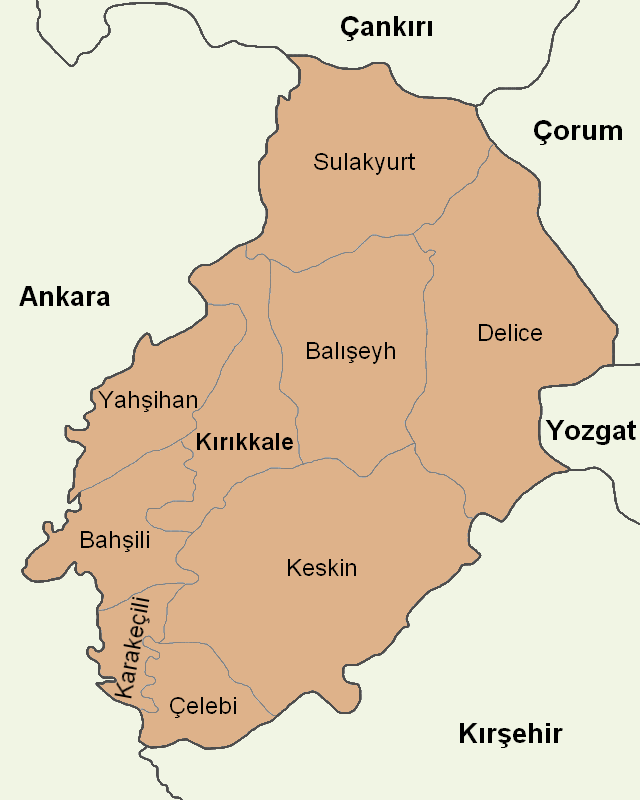

Kırıkkale province is divided into 9 districts (capital district in bold):

- Bahşılı
- Balışeyh
- Çelebi
- Delice
- Karakeçili
- Keskin
- **Kırıkkale**
- Sulakyurt
- Yahşihan

== Gallery ==
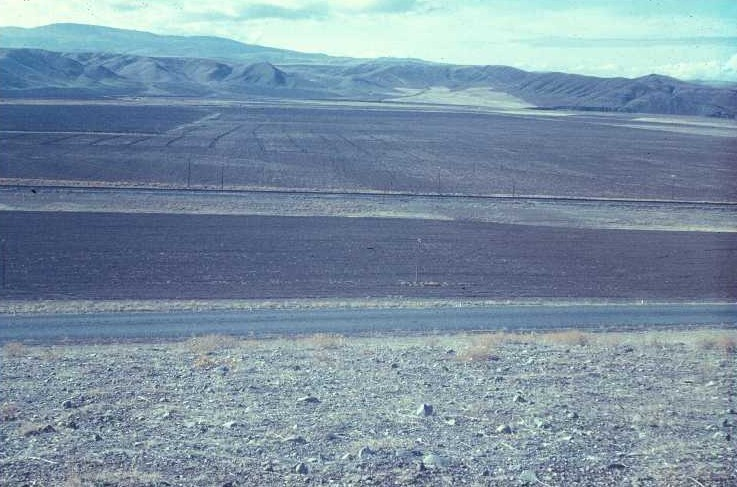
Delice River valley near Yeni Yapan

== See also ==
- List of populated places in Kırıkkale Province
