= List of populated places in Kilis Province =

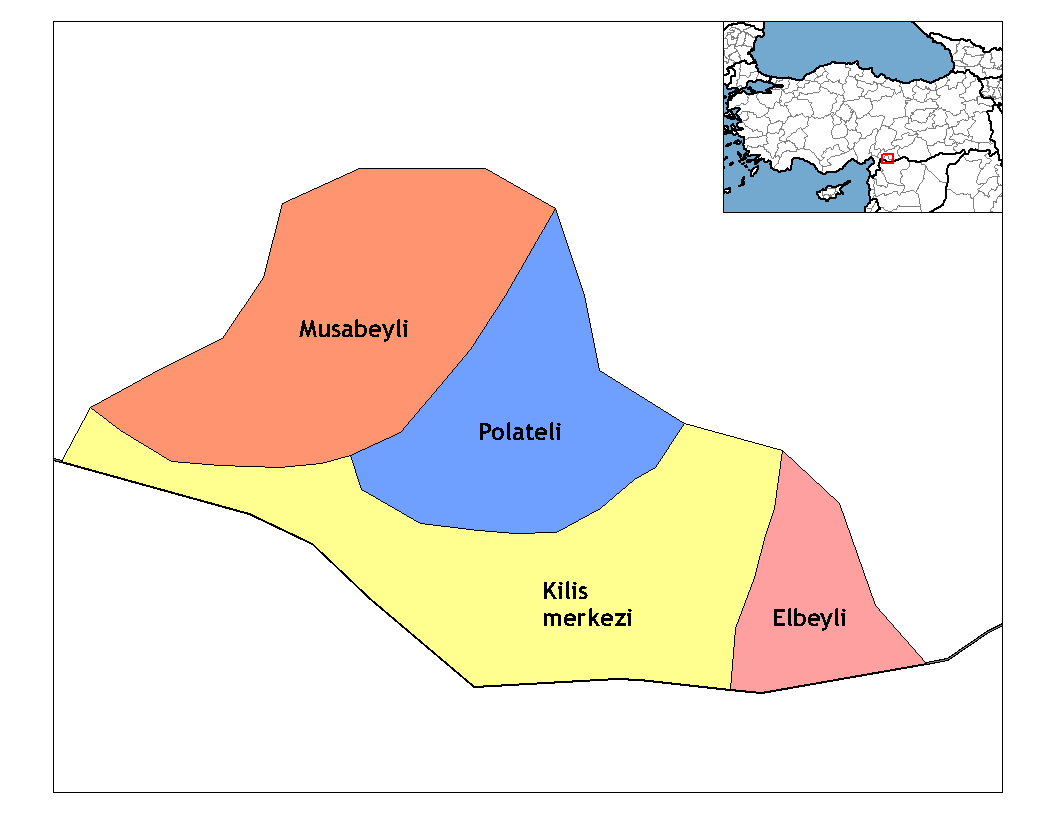
Kilis Province

This is a list of populated places in Kilis Province, Turkey. The list is subdivided by the four districts of the province. The administrative center of each district is listed first for that district.

== Kilis ==
- Kilis
- Acar, Kilis
- Akçabağlar, Kilis
- Akıncı, Kilis
- Alatepe, Kilis
- Arpakesmez, Kilis
- Başmağara, Kilis
- Beşenli, Kilis
- Beşikkaya, Kilis
- Bozcayazı, Kilis
- Bulamaçlı, Kilis
- Büyükkonak, Kilis
- Ceritler, Kilis
- Çakallıpınar, Kilis
- Çalkaya, Kilis
- Çerçili, Kilis
- Çörten, Kilis
- Çukuroba, Kilis
- Deliçay, Kilis
- Deliosman, Kilis
- Demirciler, Kilis
- Demirışık, Kilis
- Doğançay, Kilis
- Dölek, Kilis
- Duruca, Kilis
- Göktaş, Kilis
- Gözkaya, Kilis
- Gülbaba, Kilis
- Gümüşsuyu, Kilis
- Güneşli, Kilis
- Hıcıpoğlu, Kilis
- Hisar, Kilis
- İnanlı, Kilis
- Kapdeğirmeni, Kilis
- Karacaören, Kilis
- Karaçavuş, Kilis
- Karamelik, Kilis
- Kocabeyli, Kilis
- Kuskunkıran, Kilis
- Kuzuini, Kilis
- Küçükkonak, Kilis
- Küplüce, Kilis
- Güvenli, Kilis
- Mağaracık, Kilis
- Mehmetali, Kilis
- Mısırcık, Kilis
- Narlıca, Kilis
- Oylum, Kilis
- Saatli, Kilis
- Süngütepe, Kilis
- Tahtalı, Kilis
- Tamburalı, Kilis
- Topdağı, Kilis
- Uzunlu, Kilis
- Yavuzlu, Kilis

== Elbeyli ==
- Elbeyli
- Akçaağıl, Elbeyli
- Alahan, Elbeyli
- Aşağıbeylerbeyi, Elbeyli
- Beşiriye, Elbeyli
- Çankallı, Elbeyli
- Çıldıroba, Elbeyli
- Erikliyayla, Elbeyli
- Geçerli, Elbeyli
- Günece, Elbeyli
- Güvendik, Elbeyli
- Havuzluçam, Elbeyli
- Kalbursait, Elbeyli
- Karacurun, Elbeyli
- Karaçağıl, Elbeyli
- Kılcan, Elbeyli
- Mercanlı, Elbeyli
- Sağlıcak, Elbeyli
- Selmincik, Elbeyli
- Taşlıbakar, Elbeyli
- Turanlı, Elbeyli
- Uğurlar, Elbeyli
- Yağızköy, Elbeyli
- Yenideğirmen, Elbeyli

== Musabeyli ==
- Musabeyli
- Ağcakent, Musabeyli
- Aşağıbademli, Musabeyli
- Aşağıkalecik, Musabeyli
- Balıklı, Musabeyli
- Belentepe, Musabeyli
- Bozkaya, Musabeyli
- Çayıraltı, Musabeyli
- Çınarköy, Musabeyli
- Dorucak, Musabeyli
- Dutluca, Musabeyli
- Fericek, Musabeyli
- Fırlaklı, Musabeyli
- Geçitboyu, Musabeyli
- Gökmusa, Musabeyli
- Gözlüce, Musabeyli
- Gündeğer, Musabeyli
- Hacılar, Musabeyli
- Hasancalı, Musabeyli
- Haydarlar, Musabeyli
- Hüseyinoğlu, Musabeyli
- Karadut, Musabeyli
- Karbeyaz, Musabeyli
- Kayapınar, Musabeyli
- Kaynaklı, Musabeyli
- Kızılkent, Musabeyli
- Koçcağız, Musabeyli
- Kolpınar, Musabeyli
- Kozlubağ, Musabeyli
- Körahmethüyüğü, Musabeyli
- Kurtaran, Musabeyli
- Kürtüncü, Musabeyli
- Madenyolu, Musabeyli
- Sabanlı, Musabeyli
- Şenlikçe, Musabeyli
- Tahtalıkaradut, Musabeyli
- Tokaçgemriği, Musabeyli
- Topallar, Musabeyli
- Uğurtepe, Musabeyli
- Üçpınar, Musabeyli
- Yastıca, Musabeyli
- Yedigöz, Musabeyli
- Yeşiloba, Musabeyli
- Yukarıbademli, Musabeyli
- Yukarıkalecik, Musabeyli
- Yuvabaşı, Musabeyli
- Zeytinbağı, Musabeyli

== Polateli ==
- Polateli
- Bağarası, Polateli
- Bektaşoğlu, Polateli
- Belenözü, Polateli
- Dümbüllü, Polateli
- Eğlen, Polateli
- Kaymakam Kürşat Ağca, Polateli
- Kızılgöl, Polateli
- Ömercik, Polateli
- Ömeroğlu, Polateli
- Polatbey, Polateli
- Söğütlü, Polateli
- Taşlıalan, Polateli
- Ürünlü, Polateli
- Yeniyapan, Polateli
- Yeniyurt, Polateli
- Yeşilpınar, Polateli
- Yılanca, Polateli
