= Tahtalı =

Tahtalı may refer to places in Turkey:

== Villages ==
- Tahtalı, Gönen, Balıkesir Province
- Tahtalı, Güroymak, Bitlis Province
- Tahtalı, Nilüfer, Bursa Province
- Tahtalı, Kilis, Kilis Province
- Tahtalı, Derince, Kocaeli Province
- Tahtalı, Çumra, Konya Province
- Tahtalı, Yazıhan, Malatya Province
- Tahtalı, Niksar, Tokat Province
- Another name for Çatalağzı, Zonguldak Province

== Other ==
- Germanicopolis (Bithynia) (also known as Tahtalı), an ancient city
- Tahtalı Dağı, a mountain
- Tahtalı Mountain Range
- Tahtalı Dam

== See also ==
- Tahtalıkaradut, Turkey
- Tahtali, Iran
- Tahtali-Jami Mosque, Crimea
