= Karadut =

Karadut (literally "black mulberry" in Turkish) may refer to the following places in Turkey:

- Karadut, Kahta, a village in the district of Kahta, Adıyaman Province
- Karadut, Koçarlı, a village in the district of Koçarlı, Aydın Province
- Karadut, Musabeyli, a village in Musabeyli District, Kilis Province
