= Yağızköy, Elbeyli =

Village in Kilis Province, Turkey

Yağızköy
- Village
- Location within Turkey
- Coordinates: 36°40′46″N 37°21′44″E
- Country: Turkey
- Province: Kilis
- District: Elbeyli
- Population (2022): 246
- Time zone: UTC+3 (TRT)

Yağızköy, historically Delhemi, is a village in the Elbeyli District, Kilis Province, Turkey. The village is inhabited by Turkmens of the Elbegli tribe and Abdals of the Kuyucular tribe and had a population of 246 in 2022.

In late 19th century, German orientalist Martin Hartmann listed the village as a settlement of 10 houses inhabited by Turks.
