= Beşiriye, Elbeyli =

Village in Kilis Province, Turkey

Beşiriye
- Village
- Location within Turkey
- Coordinates: 36°40′11″N 37°21′26″E
- Country: Turkey
- Province: Kilis
- District: Elbeyli
- Population (2022): 137
- Time zone: UTC+3 (TRT)

Beşiriye is a village in the Elbeyli District, Kilis Province, Turkey. The village is inhabited by Turkmens of the Elbegli tribe and had a population of 137 in 2022.
