= Alahan =

Alahan may refer to:

- Alahan Monastery, a former Christian monastery in Turkey
- Alahan, Elbeyli, a village in Turkey
