= Yenideğirmen, Elbeyli =

Village in Kilis Province, Turkey

Yenideğirmen
- Village
- Location within Turkey
- Coordinates: 36°46′8″N 37°25′23″E
- Country: Turkey
- Province: Kilis
- District: Elbeyli
- Population (2022): 229
- Time zone: UTC+3 (TRT)

Yenideğirmen, historically Yazlıbecer, is a village in the Elbeyli District, Kilis Province, Turkey. The village is inhabited by Turkmens of various tribes including Elbegli and had a population of 229 in 2022.
