= Bozcayazı, Kilis =

Village in Kilis Province, Turkey

Bozcayazı
- Village
- Location within Turkey
- Coordinates: 36°43′18″N 37°19′40″E
- Country: Turkey
- Province: Kilis
- District: Kilis
- Population (2022): 134
- Time zone: UTC+3 (TRT)

Bozcayazı, historically Zabaran, is a village in the Kilis District, Kilis Province, Turkey. The village is inhabited by Turkmens of the Elbegli tribe and Abdals of the Paparlar tribe and had a population of 134 in 2022.

In late 19th century, German orientalist Martin Hartmann listed the village as a settlement of 10 houses inhabited by Turks.
