= Elbeyli =

- Municipality
- Location in Turkey
- Coordinates: 36°40′31″N 37°27′58″E
- Country: Turkey
- Province: Kilis
- District: Elbeyli

Government
  - Mayor: İsmail Kördeve (AKP)
- Population (2022): 1,974
- Time zone: UTC+3 (TRT)
- Area code: 0348
- Website: www.elbeyli.bel.tr

Elbeyli, formerly Alimantar, is a town and the administrative seat of Elbeyli District in the Kilis Province in Turkey. Its population is 1,974 (2022). The town is inhabited by Turkomans of the Barak and Elbegli tribes, the latter of which the town is named after.
