= Çıldıroba, Elbeyli =

Village in Kilis Province, Turkey

Çıldıroba
- Village
- Location within Turkey
- Coordinates: 36°38′53″N 37°24′24″E
- Country: Turkey
- Province: Kilis
- District: Elbeyli
- Population (2022): 253
- Time zone: UTC+3 (TRT)

Çıldıroba is a village in the Elbeyli District, Kilis Province, Turkey. The village is inhabited by Turkmens of the Elbegli tribe and had a population of 253 in 2022.
