= Arpakesmez, Kilis =

Village in Kilis Province, Turkey

Arpakesmez
- Village
- Location within Turkey
- Coordinates: 36°40′14″N 37°10′54″E
- Country: Turkey
- Province: Kilis
- District: Kilis
- Population (2022): 103
- Time zone: UTC+3 (TRT)

Arpakesmez is a village in the Kilis District, Kilis Province, Turkey. The village is inhabited by Turkmens of the Elbegli tribe and had a population of 103 in 2022.
