= Kalbursait, Elbeyli =

Village in Kilis Province, Turkey

Kalbursait
- Village
- Location within Turkey
- Coordinates: 36°43′47″N 37°24′32″E
- Country: Turkey
- Province: Kilis
- District: Elbeyli
- Population (2022): 201
- Time zone: UTC+3 (TRT)

Kalbursait is a village in the Elbeyli District, Kilis Province, Turkey. The village is inhabited by Turkmens of the Elbegli tribe and had a population of 201 in 2022.
