= Bağarası =

Bağarası is a Turkish place name meaning "between the vineyard" and may refer to several places in Turkey:

- Bağarası, Polateli, a village in the Polateli district of Kilis Province
- Bağarası, Samsat, a village in the Samsat district of Adıyaman Province
- Bağarası, Söke, a town in the Söke district of Aydın Province
