= Yavuzlu, Kilis =

Village in Kilis Province, Turkey

Yavuzlu
- Village
- Location within Turkey
- Coordinates: 36°41′46″N 37°16′17″E
- Country: Turkey
- Province: Kilis
- District: Kilis
- Population (2022): 1,190
- Time zone: UTC+3 (TRT)

Yavuzlu, historically Tilhabeş, is a village in the Kilis District, Kilis Province, Turkey. The village is inhabited by Turkmens of the Elbegli tribe and had a population of 1,190 in 2022. Before the 2013 reorganisation, it was a town (belde).

In late 19th century, German orientalist Martin Hartmann listed the village as a settlement of 40 houses inhabited by Turks.
