= Turanlı, Elbeyli =

Village in Kilis Province, Turkey

Turanlı
- Village
- Location within Turkey
- Coordinates: 36°41′53″N 37°28′35″E
- Country: Turkey
- Province: Kilis
- District: Elbeyli
- Population (2022): 102
- Time zone: UTC+3 (TRT)

Turanlı, historically Böög Şekep, is a village in the Elbeyli District, Kilis Province, Turkey. The village is inhabited by Turkmens of the Elbegli tribe and had a population of 102 in 2022.
