= Gökmusa, Musabeyli =

Village in Kilis Province, Turkey

Gökmusa
- Village
- Location within Turkey
- Coordinates: 36°54′45″N 37°4′20″E
- Country: Turkey
- Province: Kilis
- District: Musabeyli
- Population (2022): 104
- Time zone: UTC+3 (TRT)

Gökmusa is a village in the Musabeyli District, Kilis Province, Turkey. The village is inhabited by Turkmens of the Çavuşlu tribe and had a population of 104 in 2022.

In late 19th century, German orientalist Martin Hartmann listed the village as a settlement of 15 houses inhabited by Turks.
