= Deliosman, Kilis =

Village in Kilis Province, Turkey

Deliosman
- Village
- Location within Turkey
- Coordinates: 36°50′23″N 36°43′43″E
- Country: Turkey
- Province: Kilis
- District: Kilis
- Population (2022): 345
- Time zone: UTC+3 (TRT)

Deliosman, also known as Koçanlı, is a village in the Kilis District, Kilis Province, Turkey. The village is inhabited by Kurds of the Delikan tribe and had a population of 345 in 2022.

In late 19th century, the village was a settlement with 5 houses, while Koçanlı was a separate settlement with 15 houses, inhabited by Kurds.
