= Küplüce, Kilis =

Village in Kilis Province, Turkey

Küplüce
- Village
- Location within Turkey
- Coordinates: 36°45′11″N 37°14′33″E
- Country: Turkey
- Province: Kilis
- District: Kilis
- Population (2022): 160
- Time zone: UTC+3 (TRT)

Küplüce, historically Araphüyüğü, is a village in the Kilis District, Kilis Province, Turkey. The village had a population of 160 in 2022.

In late 19th century, the village was a settlement of 5 houses inhabited by Turks.
