= Mehmetali, Kilis =

Village in Kilis Province, Turkey

Mehmetali
- Village
- Location within Turkey
- Coordinates: 36°49′33″N 36°56′50″E
- Country: Turkey
- Province: Kilis
- District: Kilis
- Population (2022): 60
- Time zone: UTC+3 (TRT)

Mehmetali is a village in the Kilis District, Kilis Province, Turkey. The village had a population of 60 in 2022.
