= Küçükkonak, Kilis =

Village in Kilis Province, Turkey

Küçükkonak
- Village
- Location within Turkey
- Coordinates: 36°46′20″N 37°14′39″E
- Country: Turkey
- Province: Kilis
- District: Kilis
- Population (2022): 148
- Time zone: UTC+3 (TRT)

Küçükkonak is a village in the Kilis District, Kilis Province, Turkey. The village had a population of 148 in 2022.
