= Zeytinbağı, Musabeyli =

Village in Kilis Province, Turkey

Zeytinbağı
- Village
- Location within Turkey
- Coordinates: 36°54′44″N 36°58′37″E
- Country: Turkey
- Province: Kilis
- District: Musabeyli
- Population (2022): 120
- Time zone: UTC+3 (TRT)

Zeytinbağı, historically Haskanlı, is a village in the Musabeyli District, Kilis Province, Turkey. The village had a population of 120 in 2022.

In late 19th century, German orientalist Martin Hartmann listed the village as a settlement of 10 houses inhabited by Turks.
