= Körahmethüyüğü, Musabeyli =

Village in Kilis Province, Turkey

Körahmethüyüğü
- Village
- Location within Turkey
- Coordinates: 36°59′21″N 36°57′32″E
- Country: Turkey
- Province: Kilis
- District: Musabeyli
- Population (2022): 227
- Time zone: UTC+3 (TRT)

Körahmethüyüğü is a village in the Musabeyli District, Kilis Province, Turkey. The village had a population of 227 in 2022.

In late 19th century, German orientalist Martin Hartmann listed the village as a settlement of 20 houses inhabited by Turks.
