= Bulamaçlı, Kilis =

Village in Kilis Province, Turkey

Bulamaçlı
- Village
- Location within Turkey
- Coordinates: 36°48′54″N 36°48′50″E
- Country: Turkey
- Province: Kilis
- District: Kilis
- Population (2022): 475
- Time zone: UTC+3 (TRT)

Bulamaçlı is a village in the Kilis District, Kilis Province, Turkey. The village is inhabited by Kurds of the Delikan tribe and had a population of 475 in 2022.

In late 19th century, the village was a settlement with 20 houses inhabited by Kurds.
