= Çayıraltı, Musabeyli =

Village in Kilis Province, Turkey

Çayıraltı
- Village
- Location within Turkey
- Coordinates: 36°56′26″N 36°59′18″E
- Country: Turkey
- Province: Kilis
- District: Musabeyli
- Population (2022): 185
- Time zone: UTC+3 (TRT)

Çayıraltı, historically Cibenek, is a village in the Musabeyli District, Kilis Province, Turkey. The village had a population of 185 in 2022.

In late 19th century, German orientalist Martin Hartmann listed the village as a settlement of 10 houses inhabited by Turks and Abdals.
