= Kuskunkıran, Kilis =

Village in Kilis Province, Turkey

Kuskunkıran
- Village
- Location within Turkey
- Coordinates: 36°45′19″N 37°9′6″E
- Country: Turkey
- Province: Kilis
- District: Kilis
- Population (2022): 44
- Time zone: UTC+3 (TRT)

Kuskunkıran, also known as Çakallı, is a village in the Kilis District, Kilis Province, Turkey. The village had a population of 44 in 2022.

In late 19th century, the village was a settlement of 15 houses inhabited by Kurds. The Kurdish population migrated to the region from Besni and belongs to the Reşwan tribe.
