= Demirciler, Kilis =

Village in Kilis Province, Turkey

Demirciler
- Village
- Location within Turkey
- Coordinates: 36°52′11″N 36°45′29″E
- Country: Turkey
- Province: Kilis
- District: Kilis
- Population (2022): 74
- Time zone: UTC+3 (TRT)

Demirciler is a village in the Kilis District, Kilis Province, Turkey. The village had a population of 74 in 2022.

The village was inhabited by Alevi Kurds in late 19th century.
