= Kozlubağ, Musabeyli =

Village in Kilis Province, Turkey

Kozlubağ
- Village
- Location within Turkey
- Coordinates: 36°57′28″N 37°0′14″E
- Country: Turkey
- Province: Kilis
- District: Musabeyli
- Population (2022): 160
- Time zone: UTC+3 (TRT)

Kozlubağ, historically Hatun Mezraası, is a village in the Musabeyli District, Kilis Province, Turkey. The village had a population of 160 in 2022. In late 19th century, the village was a settlement of 10 houses inhabited by Turks.
