= Eğlen, Polateli =

Village in Kilis Province, Turkey

Eğlen
- Village
- Location within Turkey
- Coordinates: 36°48′12″N 37°6′16″E
- Country: Turkey
- Province: Kilis
- District: Polateli
- Population (2022): 75
- Time zone: UTC+3 (TRT)

Eğlen is a village in the Polateli District, Kilis Province, Turkey. The village is inhabited by Turkicized Kurds of the Delikan, Pazuki, and Reşwan tribes, Turkmens of the Çavuşlu tribe, and Fellah Arabs. It had a population of 75 in 2022.

In late 19th century, German orientalist Martin Hartmann listed the village as a settlement of 10 houses inhabited by Kurds. The Kurdish population migrated to the region from Besni, while the village later received Arab migration from al-Bab.
