= Yeniyapan, Polateli =

Village in Kilis Province, Turkey

Yeniyapan
- Village
- Location within Turkey
- Coordinates: 36°51′55″N 37°13′33″E
- Country: Turkey
- Province: Kilis
- District: Polateli
- Population (2022): 594
- Time zone: UTC+3 (TRT)

Yeniyapan is a village in the Polateli District, Kilis Province, Turkey. The village had a population of 594 in 2022.
