= Büyükkonak, Kilis =

Village in Kilis Province, Turkey

Büyükkonak
- Village
- Location within Turkey
- Coordinates: 36°47′0″N 37°14′27″E
- Country: Turkey
- Province: Kilis
- District: Kilis
- Population (2022): 65
- Time zone: UTC+3 (TRT)

Büyükkonak is a village in the Kilis District, Kilis Province, Turkey. The village had a population of 65 in 2022.
