= Kocabeyli, Kilis =

Village in Kilis Province, Turkey

Kocabeyli
- Village
- Location within Turkey
- Coordinates: 36°48′35″N 36°55′11″E
- Country: Turkey
- Province: Kilis
- District: Kilis
- Population (2022): 218
- Time zone: UTC+3 (TRT)

Kocabeyli, historically Merdanlı, is a village in the Kilis District, Kilis Province, Turkey. The village had a population of 218 in 2022.

In late 19th century, the village was a settlement of 15 houses inhabited by Kurds.
