= Havuzluçam, Elbeyli =

Village in Kilis Province, Turkey

Havuzluçam
- Village
- Location within Turkey
- Coordinates: 36°39′55″N 37°23′59″E
- Country: Turkey
- Province: Kilis
- District: Elbeyli
- Population (2022): 350
- Time zone: UTC+3 (TRT)

Havuzluçam, historically Bıykır, is a village in the Elbeyli District, Kilis Province, Turkey. The village had a population of 350 in 2022.

In late 19th century, German orientalist Martin Hartmann listed the village as a settlement of 15 houses inhabited by Turks.
