= Mercanlı, Elbeyli =

Village in Kilis Province, Turkey

Mercanlı
- Village
- Location within Turkey
- Coordinates: 36°45′57″N 37°27′15″E
- Country: Turkey
- Province: Kilis
- District: Elbeyli
- Population (2022): 39
- Time zone: UTC+3 (TRT)

Mercanlı is a village in the Elbeyli District, Kilis Province, Turkey. The village is inhabited by Turkmens of the Barak tribe and had a population of 39 in 2022.
