= Deliçay, Kilis =

Village in Kilis Province, Turkey

Deliçay
- Village
- Location within Turkey
- Coordinates: 36°49′46″N 36°59′16″E
- Country: Turkey
- Province: Kilis
- District: Kilis
- Population (2022): 92
- Time zone: UTC+3 (TRT)

Deliçay, historically Bekolar, is a village in the Kilis District, Kilis Province, Turkey. The village had a population of 92 in 2022.

In late 19th century, German orientalist Martin Hartmann listed the village as a settlement of 7 houses inhabited by Kurds.
