= Duruca, Kilis =

Village in Kilis Province, Turkey

Duruca
- Village
- Location within Turkey
- Coordinates: 36°45′21″N 37°1′48″E
- Country: Turkey
- Province: Kilis
- District: Kilis
- Population (2022): 568
- Time zone: UTC+3 (TRT)

Duruca, historically Karnebi, is a village in the Kilis District, Kilis Province, Turkey. The village had a population of 568 in 2022. English traveler Mark Sykes recorded Karnebi as a village inhabited by Turks in early 20th century.
