= Ömeroğlu, Polateli =

Village in Kilis Province, Turkey

Ömeroğlu
- Village
- Location within Turkey
- Coordinates: 36°52′30″N 37°11′30″E
- Country: Turkey
- Province: Kilis
- District: Polateli
- Population (2022): 215
- Time zone: UTC+3 (TRT)

Ömeroğlu is a village in the Polateli District, Kilis Province, Turkey. The village had a population of 215 in 2022.
