= Hacipoğlu, Kilis =

Village in Kilis Province, Turkey

Hacipoğlu
- Village
- Location within Turkey
- Coordinates: 36°48′2″N 36°57′17″E
- Country: Turkey
- Province: Kilis
- District: Kilis
- Population (2022): 78
- Time zone: UTC+3 (TRT)

Hacipoğlu (also: Hicipoğlu) is a village in the Kilis District, Kilis Province, Turkey. The village had a population of 78 in 2022.
