= Belenözü, Polateli =

Village in Kilis Province, Turkey

Belenözü
- Village
- Location within Turkey
- Coordinates: 36°52′38″N 37°4′20″E
- Country: Turkey
- Province: Kilis
- District: Polateli
- Population (2022): 331
- Time zone: UTC+3 (TRT)

Belenözü, historically Ravanda, is a village in the Polateli District, Kilis Province, Turkey. The village had a population of 331 in 2022.

In late 19th century, German orientalist Martin Hartmann listed the village as a settlement of 25 houses inhabited by Turks.
