= Çörten, Kilis =

Village in Kilis Province, Turkey

Çörten
- Village
- Location within Turkey
- Coordinates: 36°46′26″N 37°17′44″E
- Country: Turkey
- Province: Kilis
- District: Kilis
- Population (2022): 196
- Time zone: UTC+3 (TRT)

Çörten is a village in the Kilis District, Kilis Province, Turkey. The village had a population of 196 in 2022.
