= Süngütepe, Kilis =

Village in Kilis Province, Turkey

Süngütepe
- Village
- Location within Turkey
- Coordinates: 36°47′30″N 36°57′2″E
- Country: Turkey
- Province: Kilis
- District: Kilis
- Population (2022): 459
- Time zone: UTC+3 (TRT)

Süngütepe, historically Bavuk (Kurdish: Bawik), is a village in the Kilis District, Kilis Province, Turkey. The village is inhabited by Kurds of the Delikan tribe and had a population of 459 in 2022.

In late 19th century, the village was a settlement of 10 houses inhabited by Kurds.
