= Karacurun, Elbeyli =

Village in Kilis Province, Turkey

Karacurun
- Village
- Location within Turkey
- Coordinates: 36°43′47″N 37°28′8″E
- Country: Turkey
- Province: Kilis
- District: Elbeyli
- Population (2022): 187
- Time zone: UTC+3 (TRT)

Karacurun is a village in the Elbeyli District, Kilis Province, Turkey. The village is inhabited by Abdals of the Kurular tribe and had a population of 187 in 2022.
