= Kilis quilts =

Quilt unique to the Kilis province of Turkey

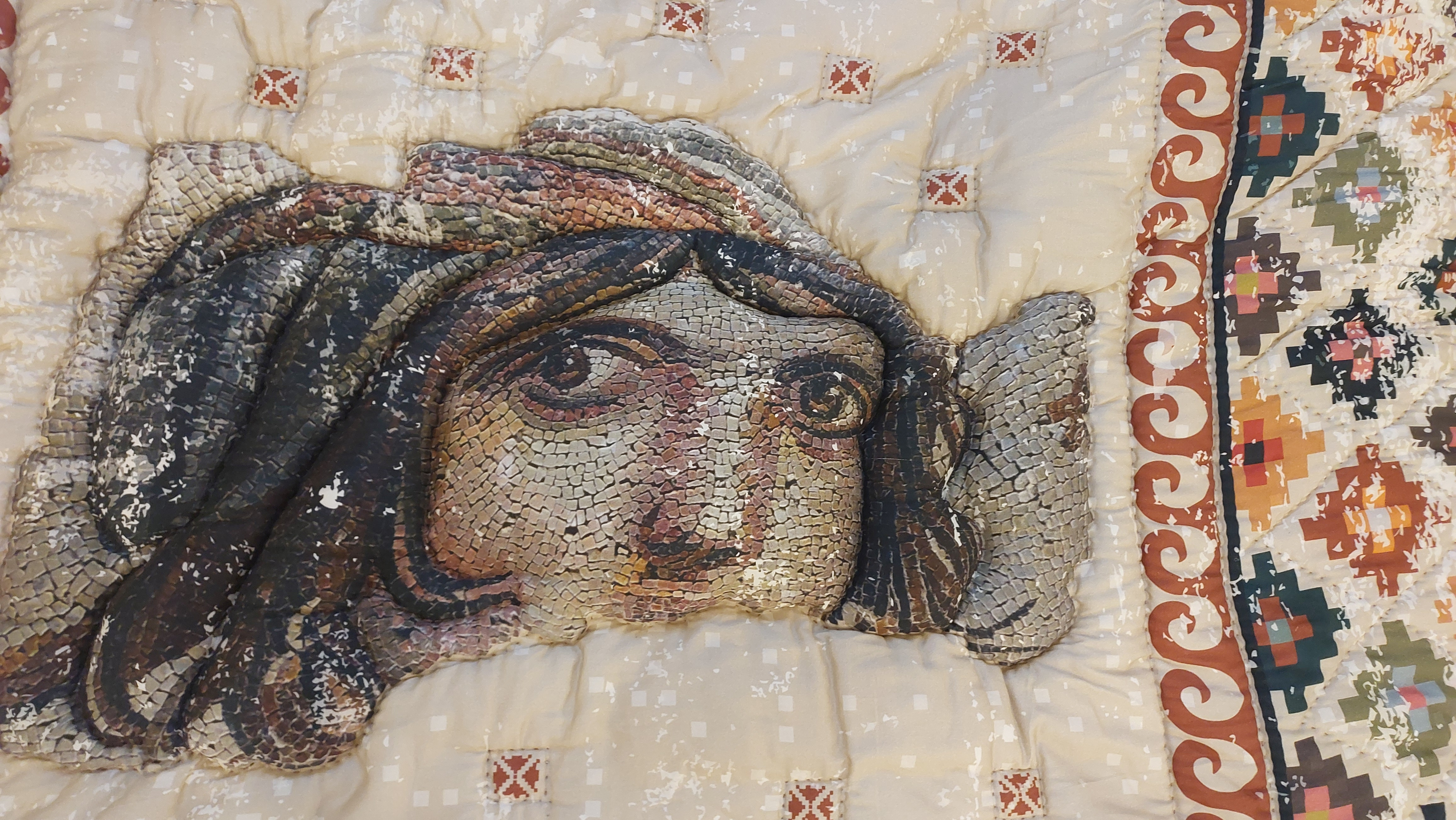
Kilis yorganı

Kilis quilts, is a type of quilt unique to the city of Kilis in Turkey, produced by embroidering satin with a needle.

The top of the quilt is made of shiny fabric (satin), while the bottom (lining) is made of muslin. In the early days, quilts were filled with wool and cotton, but today they are filled with fibre. It is embroidered with the same thread as the pattern, and the pattern is usually located in the centre of the quilt.

Quilt-making, which was once a source of livelihood for Kilis housewives, is now carried out by men in factories and commercial enterprises.

Today, Kilis quilts are being revived and promoted through various social projects.

== Gallery ==
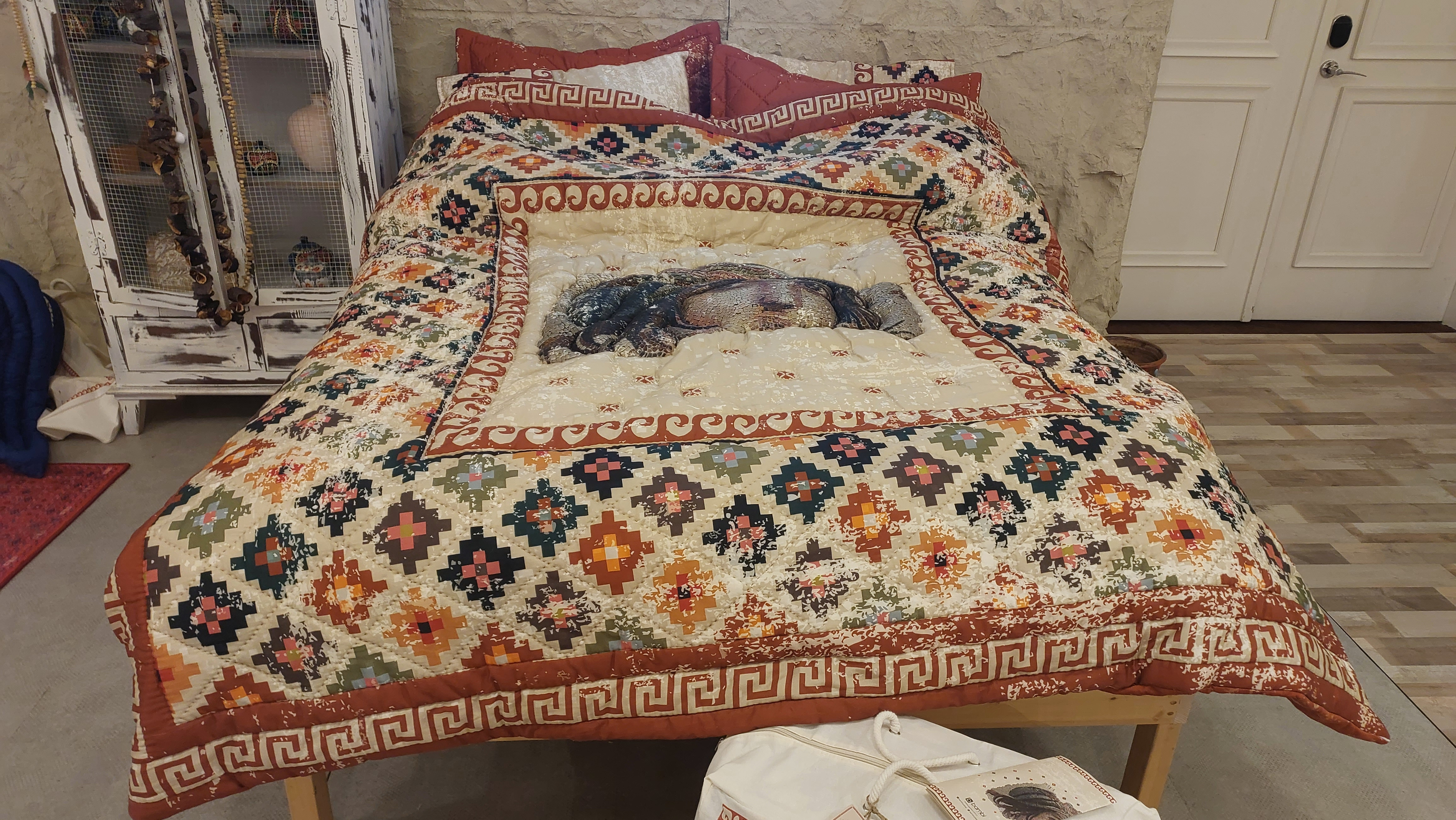

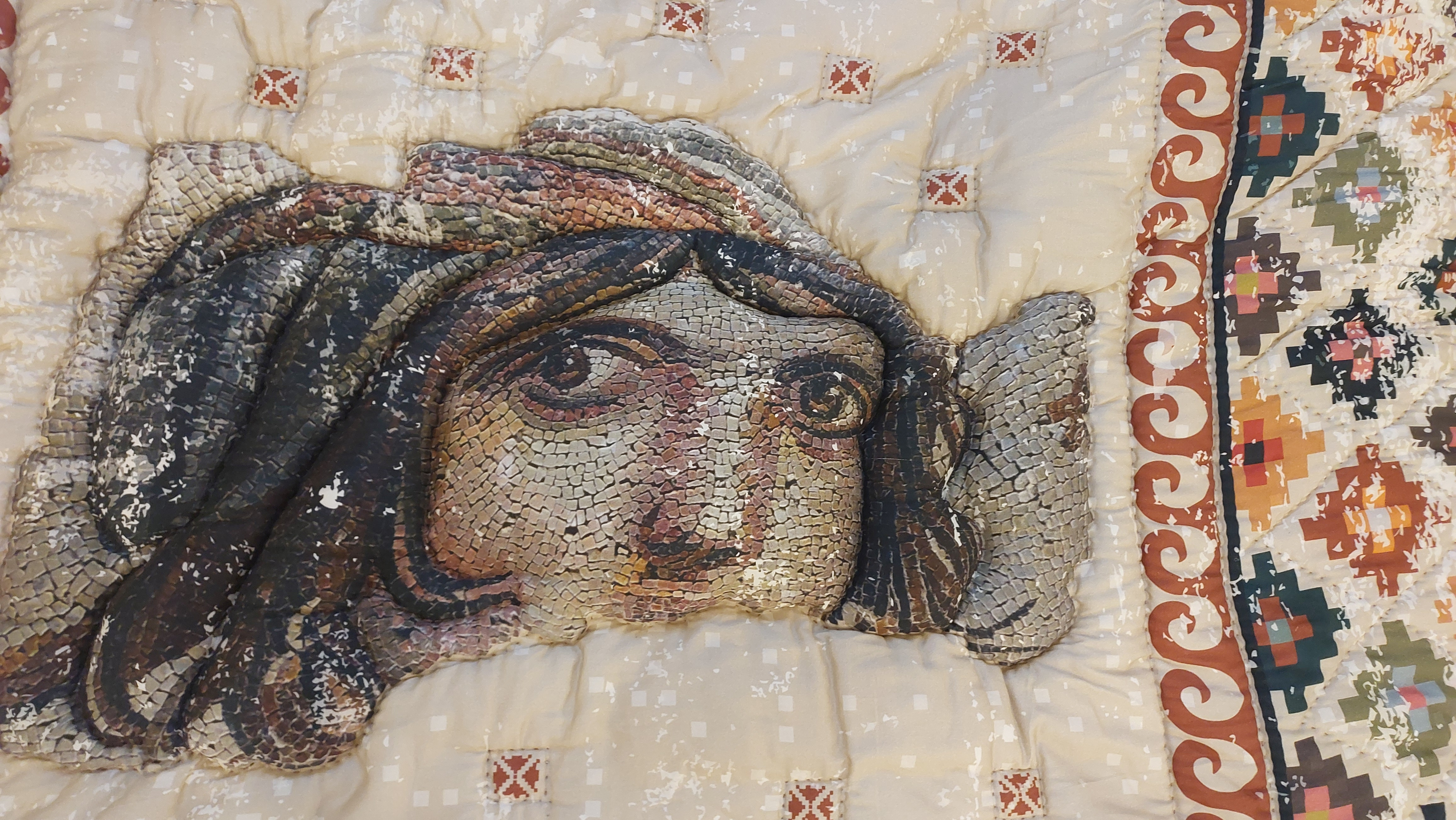

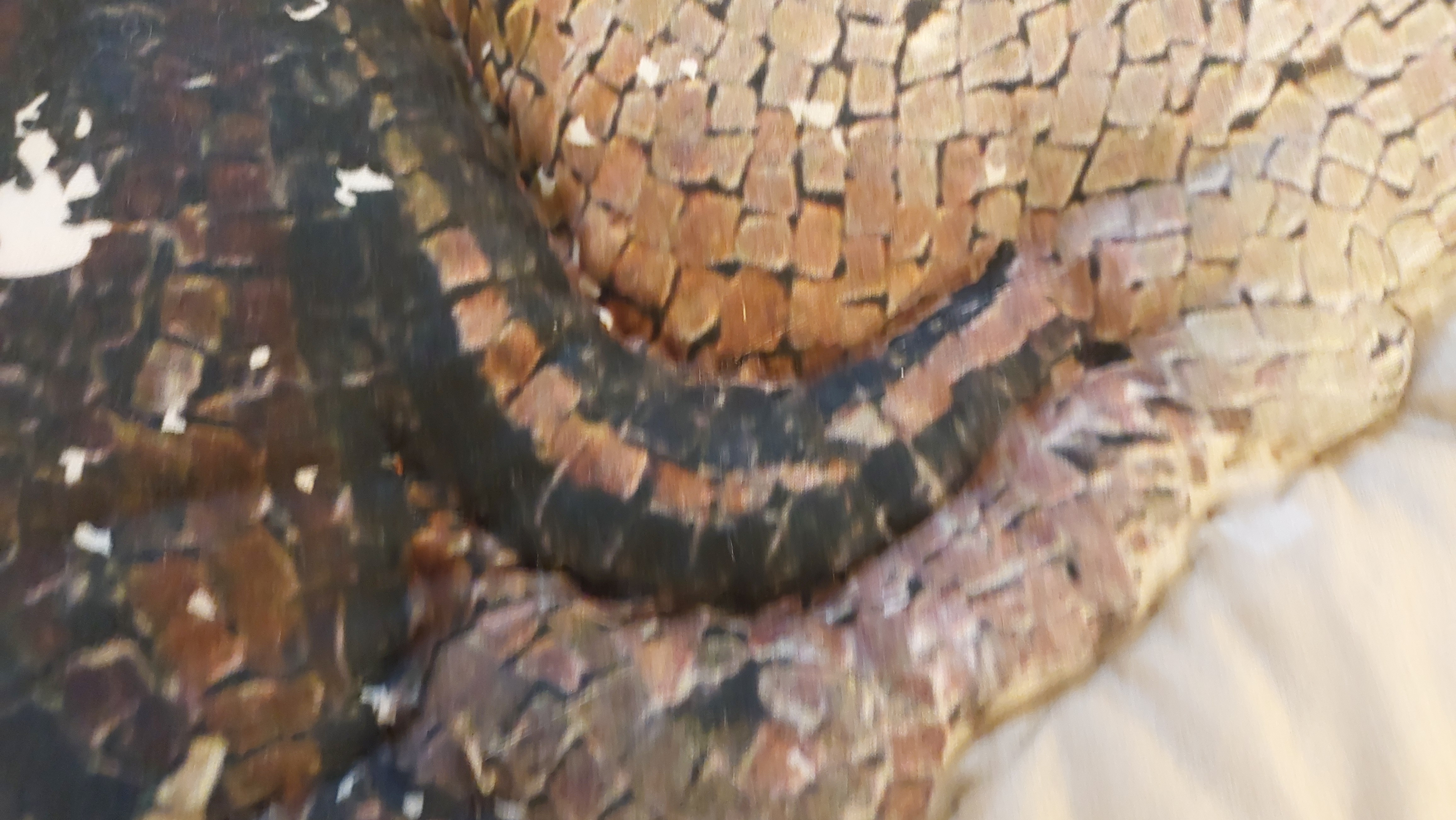

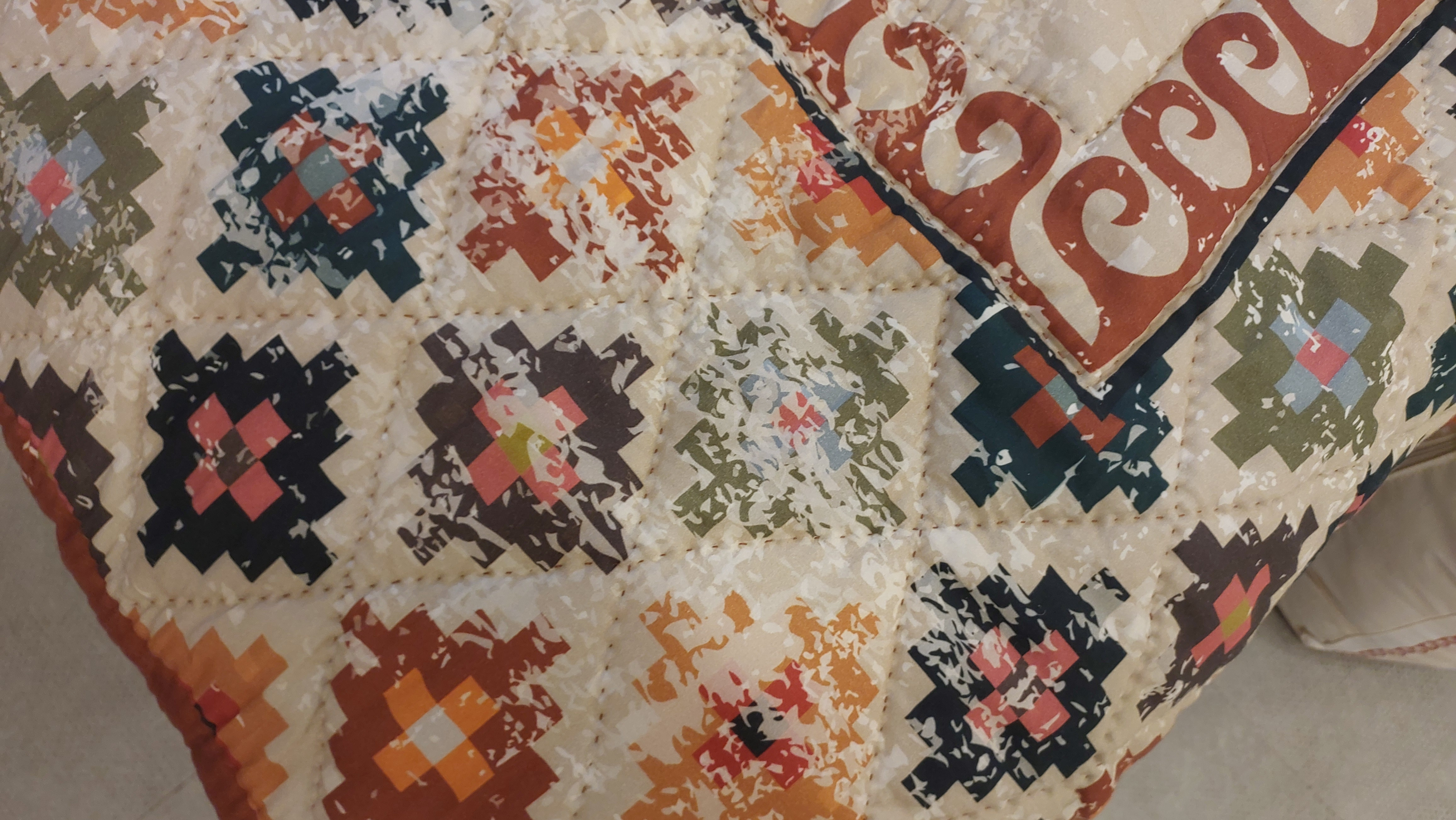

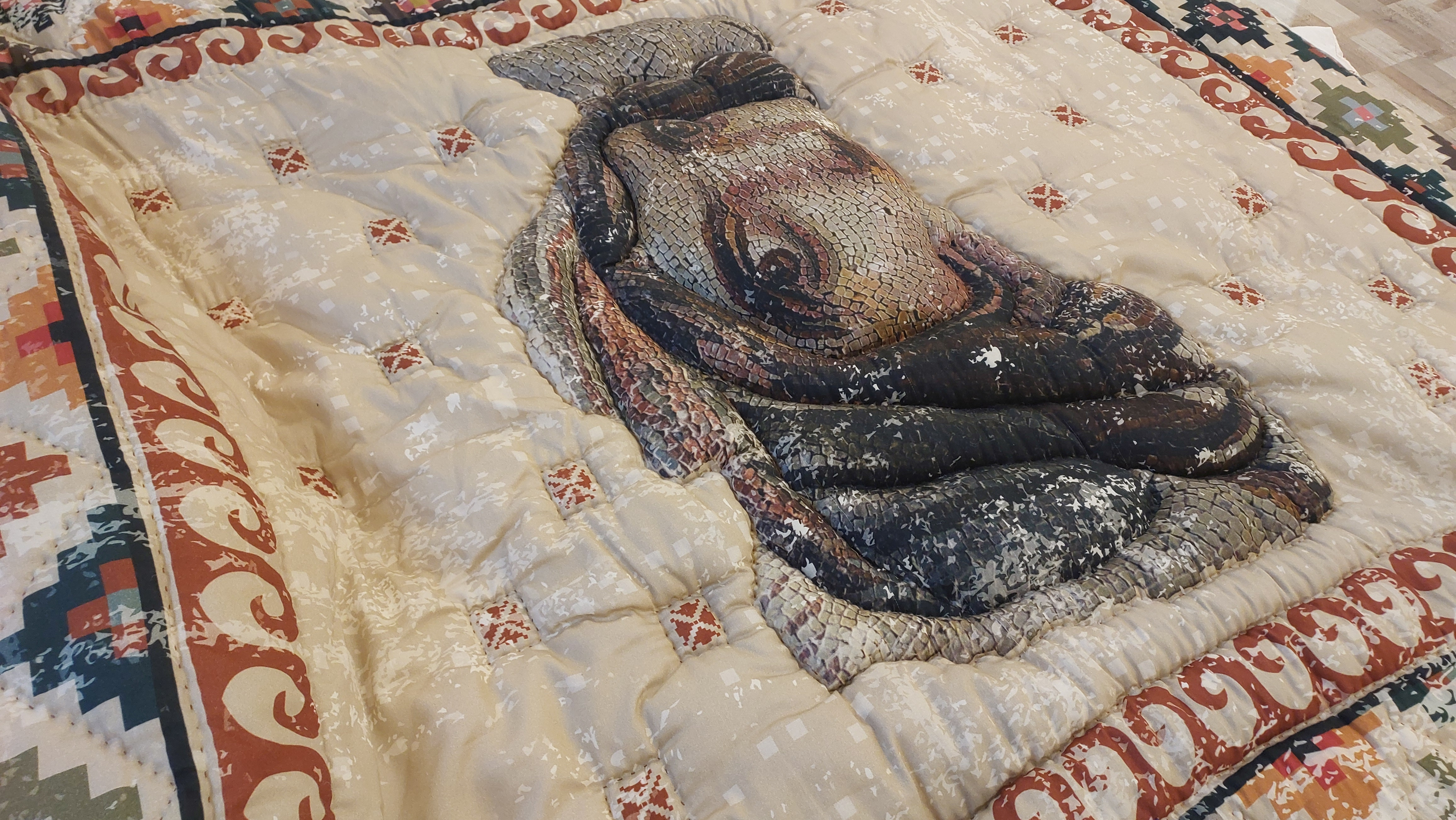
