= Kurtaran, Musabeyli =

Village in Kilis Province, Turkey

Kurtaran
- Village
- Location within Turkey
- Coordinates: 36°53′49″N 36°58′18″E
- Country: Turkey
- Province: Kilis
- District: Musabeyli
- Population (2022): 244
- Time zone: UTC+3 (TRT)

Kurtaran, historically known as Siptiruz, is a village in the Musabeyli District, Kilis Province, Turkey. The village had a population of 244 in 2022.

In the late 19th century, German orientalist Martin Hartmann described the village as a settlement of 25 houses inhabited by Turks.
