= Uğurtepe, Musabeyli =

Village in Kilis Province, Turkey

Uğurtepe
- Village
- Location within Turkey
- Coordinates: 36°55′35″N 36°58′35″E
- Country: Turkey
- Province: Kilis
- District: Musabeyli
- Population (2022): 46
- Time zone: UTC+3 (TRT)

Uğurtepe is a village in the Musabeyli District, Kilis Province, Turkey. The village had a population of 46 in 2022.
