= Dorucak, Musabeyli =

Village in Kilis Province, Turkey

Dorucak
- Village
- Location within Turkey
- Coordinates: 36°51′15″N 36°53′12″E
- Country: Turkey
- Province: Kilis
- District: Musabeyli
- Population (2022): 190
- Time zone: UTC+3 (TRT)

Dorucak, historically Zengül, is a village in the Musabeyli District, Kilis Province, Turkey. The village had a population of 190 in 2022.

In late 19th century, the village was a settlement of 10 houses inhabited by Kurds.
