= Geçerli, Elbeyli =

Village in Kilis Province, Turkey

Geçerli
- Village
- Location within Turkey
- Coordinates: 36°42′59″N 37°31′32″E
- Country: Turkey
- Province: Kilis
- District: Elbeyli
- Population (2022): 159
- Time zone: UTC+3 (TRT)

Geçerli, historically Kumsurun, is a village in the Elbeyli District, Kilis Province, Turkey. The village is inhabited by Abdals of the Kurular tribe and had a population of 159 in 2022.
