= Kuzuini, Kilis =

Village in Kilis Province, Turkey

Kuzuini
- Village
- Location within Turkey
- Coordinates: 36°46′23″N 37°4′35″E
- Country: Turkey
- Province: Kilis
- District: Kilis
- Population (2022): 104
- Time zone: UTC+3 (TRT)

Kuzuini, historically Kuzeyni, is a village in the Kilis District, Kilis Province, Turkey. The village had a population of 104 in 2022.

In late 19th century, German orientalist Martin Hartmann listed the village as a settlement of 10 houses inhabited by Turks.
