= Akçabağlar, Kilis =

Village in Kilis Province, Turkey

Akçabağlar
- Village
- Location within Turkey
- Coordinates: 36°40′19″N 37°3′42″E
- Country: Turkey
- Province: Kilis
- District: Kilis
- Population (2022): 94
- Time zone: UTC+3 (TRT)

Akçabağlar is a village in the Kilis District, Kilis Province, Turkey. The village had a population of 94 in 2022.
