= Selmincik, Elbeyli =

Village in Kilis Province, Turkey

Selmincik
- Village
- Location within Turkey
- Coordinates: 36°44′14″N 37°29′48″E
- Country: Turkey
- Province: Kilis
- District: Elbeyli
- Population (2022): 220
- Time zone: UTC+3 (TRT)

Selmincik is a village in the Elbeyli District, Kilis Province, Turkey. The village is inhabited by Abdals of the Kurular tribe and had a population of 220 in 2022.
