= Dölek, Kilis =

Village in Kilis Province, Turkey

Dölek
- Village
- Location within Turkey
- Coordinates: 36°43′42″N 37°20′38″E
- Country: Turkey
- Province: Kilis
- District: Kilis
- Population (2022): 235
- Time zone: UTC+3 (TRT)

Dölek is a village in the Kilis District, Kilis Province, Turkey. The village had a population of 235 in 2022.

In late 19th century, German orientalist Martin Hartmann listed the village as a settlement of 10 houses inhabited by Turks.
