= Topdağı, Kilis =

Village in Kilis Province, Turkey

Topdağı
- Village
- Location within Turkey
- Coordinates: 36°45′32″N 37°10′19″E
- Country: Turkey
- Province: Kilis
- District: Kilis
- Population (2022): 98
- Time zone: UTC+3 (TRT)

Topdağı, historically Kefiz, is a village in the Kilis District, Kilis Province, Turkey. The village had a population of 98 in 2022.

In late 19th century, German orientalist Martin Hartmann listed the village as a settlement of 10 houses inhabited by Turks.
