= Haydarlar, Musabeyli =

Village in Kilis Province, Turkey

Haydarlar
- Village
- Location within Turkey
- Coordinates: 36°50′27″N 36°54′44″E
- Country: Turkey
- Province: Kilis
- District: Musabeyli
- Population (2022): 135
- Time zone: UTC+3 (TRT)

Haydarlar (Kurdish: Du Heyderan) is a village in the Musabeyli District, Kilis Province, Turkey. The village is inhabited by Kurds and had a population of 135 in 2022.

In late 19th century, German orientalist Martin Hartmann listed the village as a settlement of 10 houses inhabited by Kurds.
