= Hüseyinoğlu, Musabeyli =

Village in Kilis Province, Turkey

Hüseyinoğlu
- Village
- Location within Turkey
- Coordinates: 36°55′43″N 36°55′42″E
- Country: Turkey
- Province: Kilis
- District: Musabeyli
- Population (2022): 343
- Time zone: UTC+3 (TRT)

Hüseyinoğlu is a village in the Musabeyli District, Kilis Province, Turkey. The village had a population of 343 in 2022.

In late 19th century, German orientalist Martin Hartmann listed the village as a settlement of 20 houses inhabited by Turks.
