= Demirışık, Kilis =

Village in Kilis Province, Turkey

Demirışık
- Village
- Location within Turkey
- Coordinates: 36°40′46″N 37°1′49″E
- Country: Turkey
- Province: Kilis
- District: Kilis
- Population (2022): 121
- Time zone: UTC+3 (TRT)

Demirışık is a village in the Kilis District, Kilis Province, Turkey. The village had a population of 121 in 2022.
