= Karamelik, Kilis =

Village in Kilis Province, Turkey

Karamelik
- Village
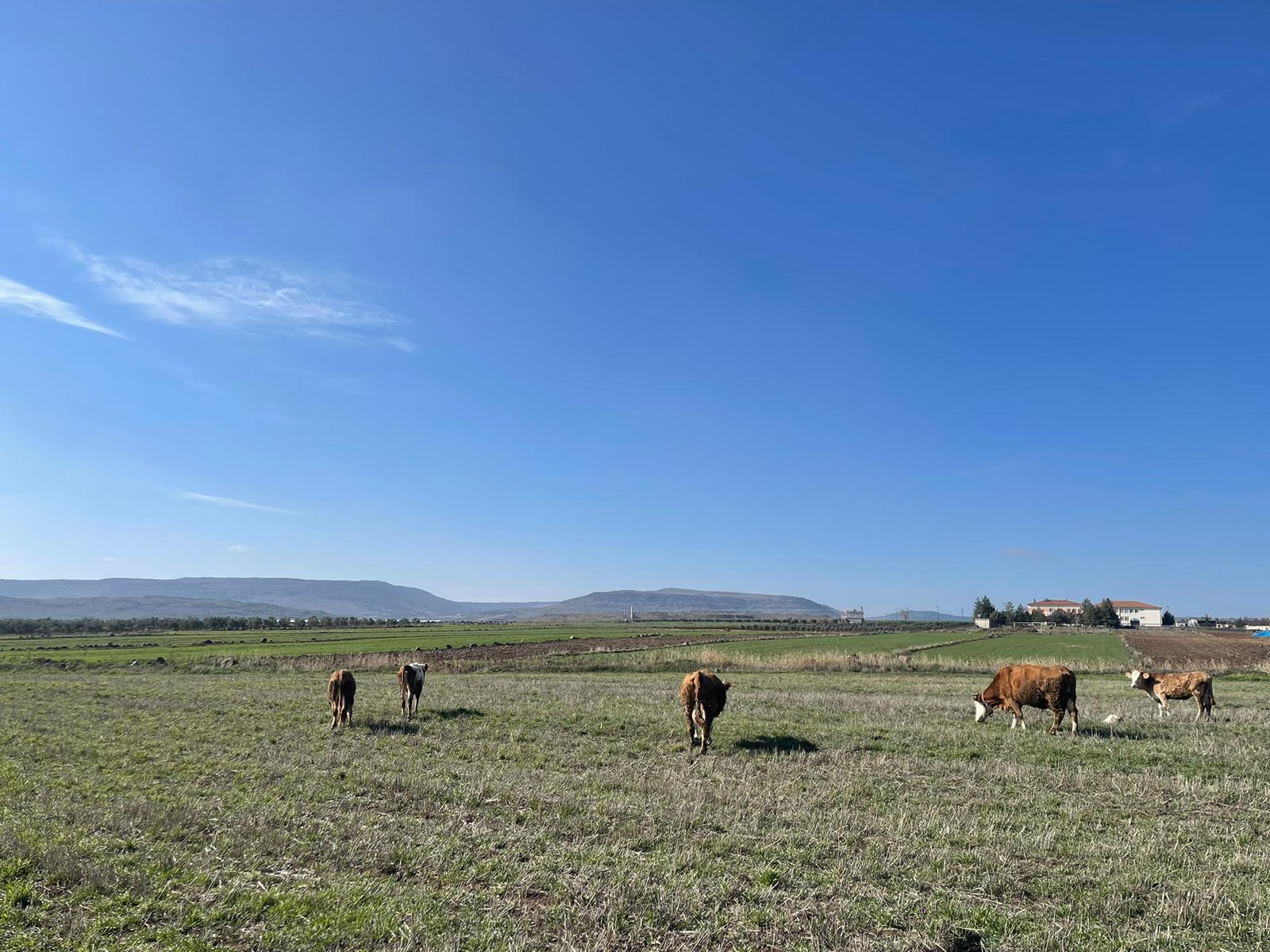
- A view of the village's fields

- Location within Turkey
- Coordinates: 36°47′25″N 37°15′9″E
- Country: Turkey
- Province: Kilis
- District: Kilis
- Population (2022): 244
- Time zone: UTC+3 (TRT)

Karamelik is a village in the Kilis District, Kilis Province, Turkey. The village had a population of 244 in 2022.

In mid-17th century, Ottoman traveller Evliya Çelebi recorded it as a Turkmen village of 100 homes in his seyahatnâme. In late 19th century, German orientalist Martin Hartmann listed the village as a settlement of 20 houses inhabited by Turks and Bedouins.
