= Çukuroba, Kilis =

Village in Kilis Province, Turkey

Çukuroba
- Village
- Location within Turkey
- Coordinates: 36°46′0″N 37°8′26″E
- Country: Turkey
- Province: Kilis
- District: Kilis
- Population (2022): 1,585
- Time zone: UTC+3 (TRT)

Çukuroba is a village in the Kilis District, Kilis Province, Turkey. The village had a population of 1,585 in 2022.

== Demographics ==
In late 19th century, the village was a settlement of 15 houses inhabited by Kurds. The Kurdish population migrated to the region from Besni and belong to the Reşwan tribe.

Demographics of the village from 2007 to 2022
Year	Total	Men	Women
2022	1585	1430	155
2021	1374	1216	158
2020	1400	1261	139
2019	1697	1557	140
2018	2014	1874	140
2017	2118	1986	132
2016	723	632	91
2015	186	102	84
2014	201	108	93
2013	210	110	100
2012	200	105	95
2011	210	109	101
2010	219	112	107
2009	217	112	105
2008	222	114	108
2007	218	113	105
