= Kılcan, Elbeyli =

Village in Kilis Province, Turkey

Kılcan
- Village
- Location within Turkey
- Coordinates: 36°46′48″N 37°23′40″E
- Country: Turkey
- Province: Kilis
- District: Elbeyli
- Population (2022): 92
- Time zone: UTC+3 (TRT)

Kılcan is a village in the Elbeyli District, Kilis Province, Turkey. The village had a population of 92 in 2022.
