= Gözkaya, Kilis =

Village in Kilis Province, Turkey

Gözkaya
- Village
- Location within Turkey
- Coordinates: 36°49′31″N 36°49′34″E
- Country: Turkey
- Province: Kilis
- District: Kilis
- Population (2022): 352
- Time zone: UTC+3 (TRT)

Gözkaya, historically Külgüman, is a village in the Kilis District, Kilis Province, Turkey. The village is inhabited by Kurds of Delikan tribe and had a population of 352 in 2022.

In late 19th century, German orientalist Martin Hartmann listed Külgüman as a settlement with 10 houses.
