= Mağaracık, Kilis =

Village in Kilis Province, Turkey

Mağaracık
- Village
- Location within Turkey
- Coordinates: 36°48′9″N 36°50′40″E
- Country: Turkey
- Province: Kilis
- District: Kilis
- Population (2022): 185
- Time zone: UTC+3 (TRT)

Mağaracık is a village in the Kilis District, Kilis Province, Turkey. The village had a population of 185 in 2022.

In late 19th century, the village was a settlement of 15 houses inhabited by Kurds.
