= Erikliyayla, Elbeyli =

Village in Kilis Province, Turkey

Erikliyayla
- Village
- Location within Turkey
- Coordinates: 36°43′23″N 37°23′0″E
- Country: Turkey
- Province: Kilis
- District: Elbeyli
- Population (2022): 149
- Time zone: UTC+3 (TRT)

Erikliyayla is a village in the Elbeyli District, Kilis Province, Turkey. The village had a population of 149 in 2022.
