= Çerçili, Kilis =

Village in Kilis Province, Turkey

Çerçili
- Village
- Location within Turkey
- Coordinates: 36°48′38″N 36°46′24″E
- Country: Turkey
- Province: Kilis
- District: Kilis
- Population (2022): 430
- Time zone: UTC+3 (TRT)

Çerçili is a village in the Kilis District, Kilis Province, Turkey. The village is inhabited by Kurds and had a population of 430 in 2022.
