= Yeniyurt, Polateli =

Village in Kilis Province, Turkey

Yeniyurt
- Village
- Location within Turkey
- Coordinates: 36°47′39″N 37°8′12″E
- Country: Turkey
- Province: Kilis
- District: Polateli
- Population (2022): 124
- Time zone: UTC+3 (TRT)

Yeniyurt is a village in the Polateli District, Kilis Province, Turkey. It had a population of 124 in 2022.
