= Kızılgöl, Polateli =

Village in Kilis Province, Turkey

Kızılgöl
- Village
- Location within Turkey
- Coordinates: 36°48′55″N 37°8′2″E
- Country: Turkey
- Province: Kilis
- District: Polateli
- Population (2022): 71
- Time zone: UTC+3 (TRT)

Kızılgöl is a village in the Polateli District, Kilis Province, Turkey. It had a population of 71 in 2022.

In late 19th century, German orientalist Martin Hartmann listed the village as a settlement of 15 houses inhabited by Kurds.
