= Çakallıpınar, Kilis =

Village in Kilis Province, Turkey

Çakallıpınar
- Village
- Location within Turkey
- Coordinates: 36°47′21″N 37°5′8″E
- Country: Turkey
- Province: Kilis
- District: Kilis
- Population (2022): 53
- Time zone: UTC+3 (TRT)

Çakallıpınar is a village in the Kilis District, Kilis Province, Turkey. The village is populated by Kurds and had a population of 53 in 2022.
