= Yuvabaşı, Musabeyli =

Village in Kilis Province, Turkey

Yuvabaşı
- Village
- Location within Turkey
- Coordinates: 36°51′39″N 36°58′38″E
- Country: Turkey
- Province: Kilis
- District: Musabeyli
- Population (2022): 232
- Time zone: UTC+3 (TRT)

Yuvabaşı is a village in the Musabeyli District, Kilis Province, Turkey. The village had a population of 232 in 2022.
