= Topallar, Musabeyli =

Village in Kilis Province, Turkey

Topallar
- Village
- Location within Turkey
- Coordinates: 36°54′13″N 36°47′22″E
- Country: Turkey
- Province: Kilis
- District: Musabeyli
- Population (2022): 235
- Time zone: UTC+3 (TRT)

Topallar is a village in the Musabeyli District, Kilis Province, Turkey. The village had a population of 235 in 2022.
