= Kayapınar, Musabeyli =

Village in Kilis Province, Turkey

Kayapınar
- Village
- Location within Turkey
- Coordinates: 36°55′8″N 36°59′40″E
- Country: Turkey
- Province: Kilis
- District: Musabeyli
- Population (2022): 82
- Time zone: UTC+3 (TRT)

Kayapınar, historically Böög Kardem, is a village in the Musabeyli District, Kilis Province, Turkey. The village had a population of 82 in 2022.

In late 19th century, German orientalist Martin Hartmann listed the village as a settlement of 25 houses inhabited by Turks.
