= Ürünlü, Polateli =

Village in Kilis Province, Turkey

Ürünlü
- Village
- Location within Turkey
- Coordinates: 36°50′30″N 37°5′45″E
- Country: Turkey
- Province: Kilis
- District: Polateli
- Population (2022): 211
- Time zone: UTC+3 (TRT)

Ürünlü, historically Sabar, is a village in the Polateli District, Kilis Province, Turkey. The village is inhabited by Turkmens of the Çavuşlu tribe and had a population of 211 in 2022.

In late 19th century, German orientalist Martin Hartmann listed the village as a settlement of 10 houses inhabited by Turks.
