= Taşlıalan, Polateli =

Village in Kilis Province, Turkey

Taşlıalan
- Village
- Location within Turkey
- Coordinates: 36°49′23″N 37°4′55″E
- Country: Turkey
- Province: Kilis
- District: Polateli
- Population (2022): 38
- Time zone: UTC+3 (TRT)

Taşlıalan, historically Zelha, is a village in the Polateli District, Kilis Province, Turkey. The village had a population of 38 in 2022.

In late 19th century, German orientalist Martin Hartmann listed the village as a settlement of 4 houses inhabited by Turks.
