= Göktaş, Kilis =

Village in Kilis Province, Turkey

Göktaş
- Village
- Location within Turkey
- Coordinates: 36°44′34″N 37°17′33″E
- Country: Turkey
- Province: Kilis
- District: Kilis
- Population (2022): 207
- Time zone: UTC+3 (TRT)

Göktaş is a village in the Kilis District, Kilis Province, Turkey. The village had a population of 207 in 2022.

In late 19th century, German orientalist Martin Hartmann listed the village as a settlement of 10 houses inhabited by Turks of the Yalavaç tribe.
