= Karaçavuş, Kilis =

Village in Kilis Province, Turkey

Karaçavuş
- Village
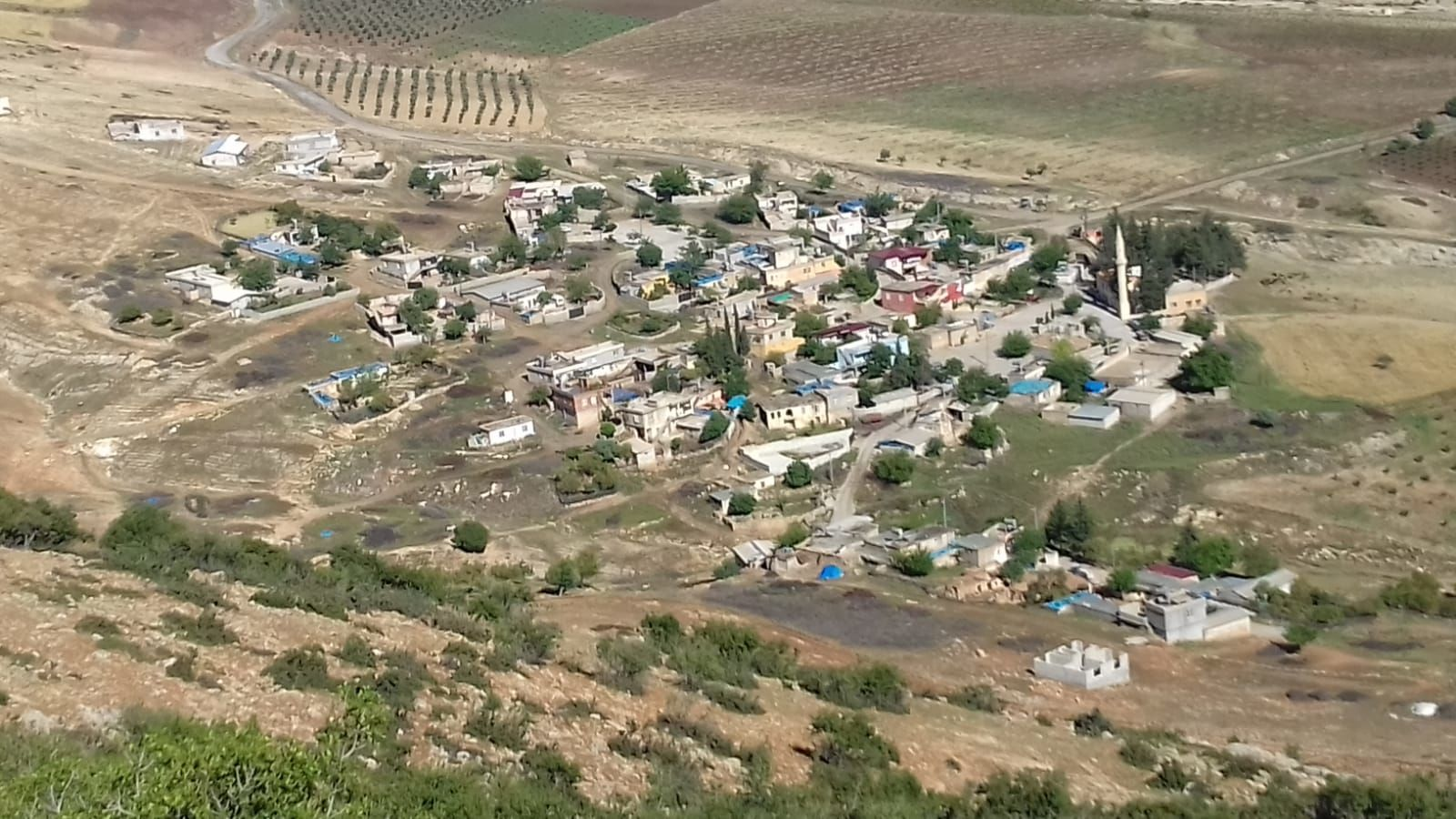
- A view of the village

- Location within Turkey
- Coordinates: 36°49′26″N 36°55′18″E
- Country: Turkey
- Province: Kilis
- District: Kilis
- Population (2022): 187
- Time zone: UTC+3 (TRT)

Karaçavuş, historically Aliyanlı, is a village in the Kilis District, Kilis Province, Turkey. The village had a population of 187 in 2022.

In late 19th century, the village was a settlement of 7 houses inhabited by Kurds.
