= Elbeyli District =

- District
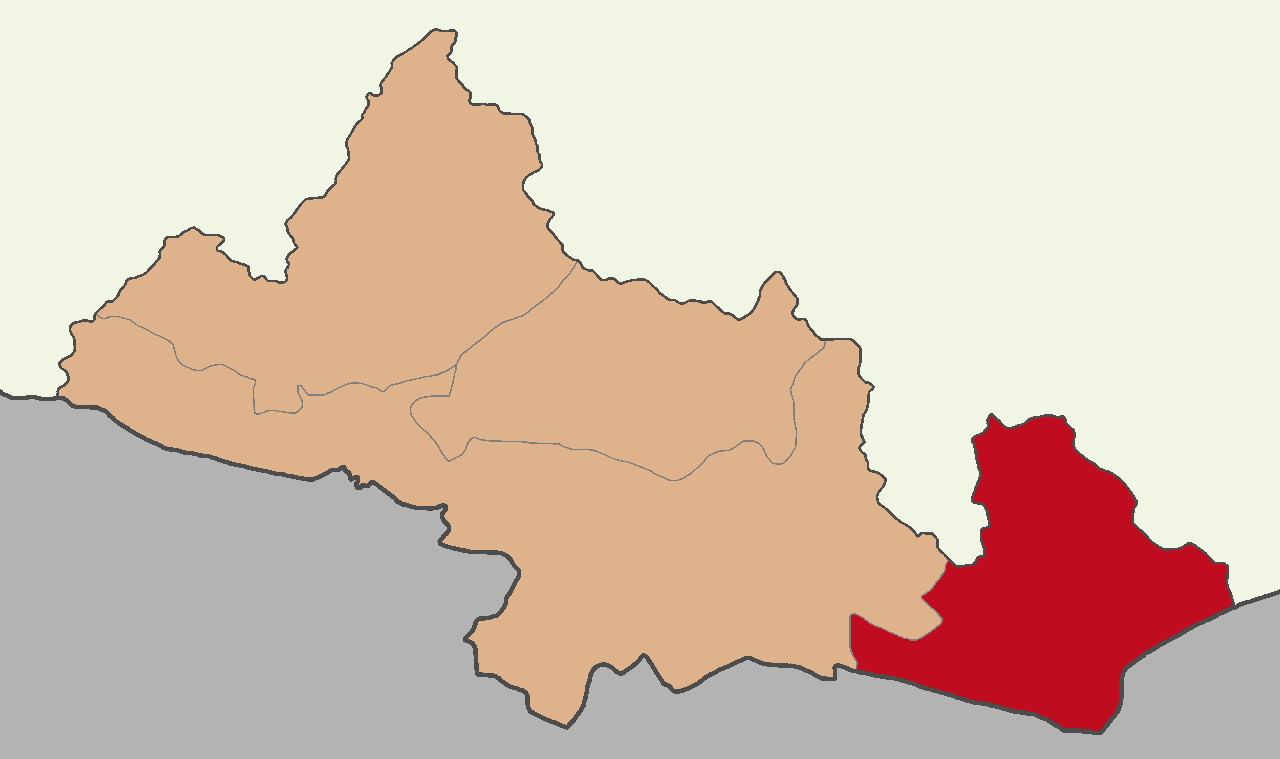
- Map showing Elbeyli District in Kilis Province

- Location in Turkey
- Coordinates: 36°40′27″N 37°27′56″E
- Country: Turkey
- Province: Kilis
- Seat: Elbeyli
- Area: 238 km^{2} (92 sq mi)
- Population (2022): 5,594
  - Density: 24/km^{2} (61/sq mi)
- Time zone: UTC+3 (TRT)

Elbeyli District is a district of Kilis Province of Turkey. Its seat is the town Elbeyli. It had a total population of 5,594 in 2022. Its area is 238 km^{2}.

== Composition ==
There is one municipality in Elbeyli District:

- Elbeyli

There are 23 villages in Elbeyli District:

- Akçağıl
- Alahan
- Aşağıbeylerbeyi
- Beşiriye
- Çangallı
- Çıldıroba
- Erikliyayla
- Geçerli
- Günece
- Güvendik
- Havuzluçam
- Kalbursait
- Karaçağıl
- Karacurun
- Kılcan
- Mercanlı
- Sağlıcak
- Selmincik
- Taşlıbakar
- Turanlı
- Uğurlar
- Yağızköy
- Yenideğirmen
