= Gümüşsuyu, Kilis =

Village in Kilis Province, Turkey

Gümüşsuyu
- Village
- Location within Turkey
- Coordinates: 36°48′37″N 37°17′24″E
- Country: Turkey
- Province: Kilis
- District: Kilis
- Population (2022): 19
- Time zone: UTC+3 (TRT)

Gümüşsuyu is a village in the Kilis District, Kilis Province, Turkey. The village had a population of 19 in 2022.
