= Çalkaya, Kilis =

Village in Kilis Province, Turkey

Çalkaya
- Village
- Location within Turkey
- Coordinates: 36°47′47″N 36°50′7″E
- Country: Turkey
- Province: Kilis
- District: Kilis
- Population (2022): 141
- Time zone: UTC+3 (TRT)

Çalkaya, historically Pertikli or Cokanlı, is a village in the Kilis District, Kilis Province, Turkey. The village had a population of 141 in 2022.

The village was inhabited by Kurds in late 19th century.
