= Aşağıbademli, Musabeyli =

Village in Kilis Province, Turkey

Aşağıbademli
- Village
- Location within Turkey
- Coordinates: 36°55′49″N 36°58′0″E
- Country: Turkey
- Province: Kilis
- District: Musabeyli
- Population (2022): 82
- Time zone: UTC+3 (TRT)

Aşağıbademli, historically Eşşekkuyu Tahtani, is a village in the Musabeyli District, Kilis Province, Turkey. The village had a population of 82 in 2022.

In late 19th century, German orientalist Martin Hartmann listed the village as a settlement of 10 houses inhabited by Turks.
