= Hasancalı, Musabeyli =

Village in Kilis Province, Turkey

Hasancalı
- Village
- Location within Turkey
- Coordinates: 36°53′9″N 36°49′0″E
- Country: Turkey
- Province: Kilis
- District: Musabeyli
- Population (2022): 1,616
- Time zone: UTC+3 (TRT)

Hasancalı is a village in the Musabeyli District, Kilis Province, Turkey. The village had a population of 1616 in 2022.

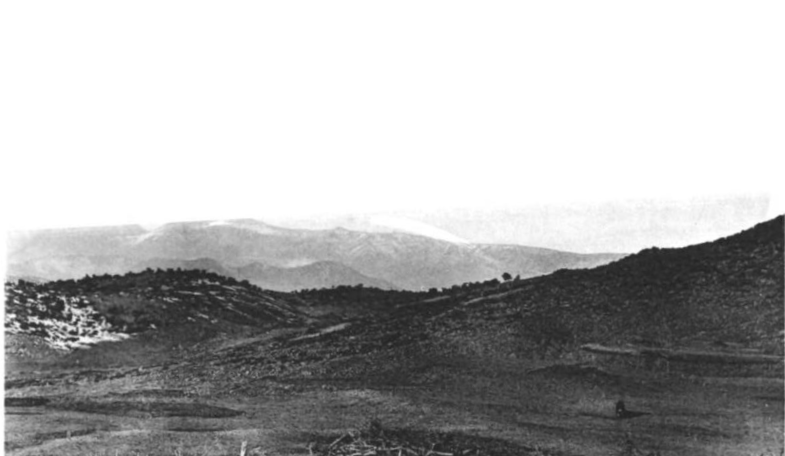
View from Hasancalı, early 20th century.

== Demographics ==
English traveller Mark Sykes noted Hasancalı as a settlement inhabited by 400 Turks in the early 20th century with nomadic Kurds dwelling around. It is currently also inhabited by Kurds of the Delikan tribe.

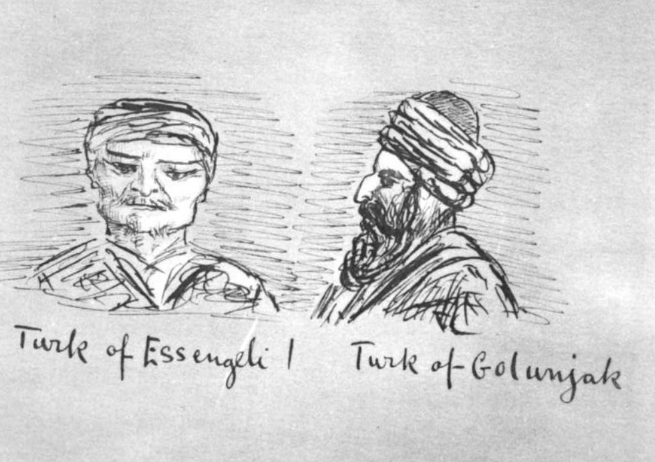
A comparative sketch by Mark Sykes of a Turk from Hasancalı (to the left) and a Turk from Kuluncak.
