= Alatepe, Kilis =

Village in Kilis Province, Turkey

Alatepe
- Village
- Location within Turkey
- Coordinates: 36°47′13″N 37°11′54″E
- Country: Turkey
- Province: Kilis
- District: Kilis
- Population (2022): 77
- Time zone: UTC+3 (TRT)

Alatepe is a village in the Kilis District, Kilis Province, Turkey. The village had a population of 77 in 2022.
