= Şenlikçe, Musabeyli =

Village in Kilis Province, Turkey

Şenlikçe
- Village
- Location within Turkey
- Coordinates: 36°52′26″N 36°52′11″E
- Country: Turkey
- Province: Kilis
- District: Musabeyli
- Population (2022): 651
- Time zone: UTC+3 (TRT)

Şenlikçe is a village in the Musabeyli District, Kilis Province, Turkey. The village is inhabited by Kurds of the Delikan tribe and had a population of 651 in 2022.

In late 19th century, the village was a settlement of 10 houses inhabited by Kurds.
