= Doğançay, Kilis =

Village in Kilis Province, Turkey

Doğançay
- Village
- Location within Turkey
- Coordinates: 36°43′32″N 37°3′17″E
- Country: Turkey
- Province: Kilis
- District: Kilis
- Population (2022): 140
- Time zone: UTC+3 (TRT)

Doğançay, historically Eyrikana, is a village in the Kilis District, Kilis Province, Turkey. The village had a population of 140 in 2022.

In late 19th century, German orientalist Martin Hartmann listed the village as a settlement of 7 houses inhabited by Turks.
