= Hacılar, Musabeyli =

Village in Kilis Province, Turkey

Hacılar
- Village
- Location within Turkey
- Coordinates: 36°53′51″N 36°53′36″E
- Country: Turkey
- Province: Kilis
- District: Musabeyli
- Population (2022): 341
- Time zone: UTC+3 (TRT)

Hacılar, historically Kulyanlı, is a village in the Musabeyli District, Kilis Province, Turkey. The village is populated by Kurds and had a population of 341 in 2022.

== History ==
The village was inhabited by Kurds in late 19th century.
