= Söğütlü, Polateli =

Village in Kilis Province, Turkey

Söğütlü
- Village
- Location within Turkey
- Coordinates: 36°49′18″N 37°7′28″E
- Country: Turkey
- Province: Kilis
- District: Polateli
- Population (2022): 83
- Time zone: UTC+3 (TRT)

Söğütlü is a village in the Polateli District, Kilis Province, Turkey. It is inhabited by Turkmens of the Çavuşlu tribe and Kurds, and had a population of 83 in 2022. The Kurdish population migrated to the region from Besni.
