= Governor of Kilis =

Governor of a Turkish Province

Governor of Kilis Kilis Valiliği
- Logo of the Governor of Kilis
- Incumbent; Ömer Kalaylı since January 19, 2026
- Appointer: President of Turkey; On the recommendation of the Turkish government
- Term length: No set term length or limit
- Inaugural holder: Lütfullah Bilgin; 1995
- Website: Office of the Governor

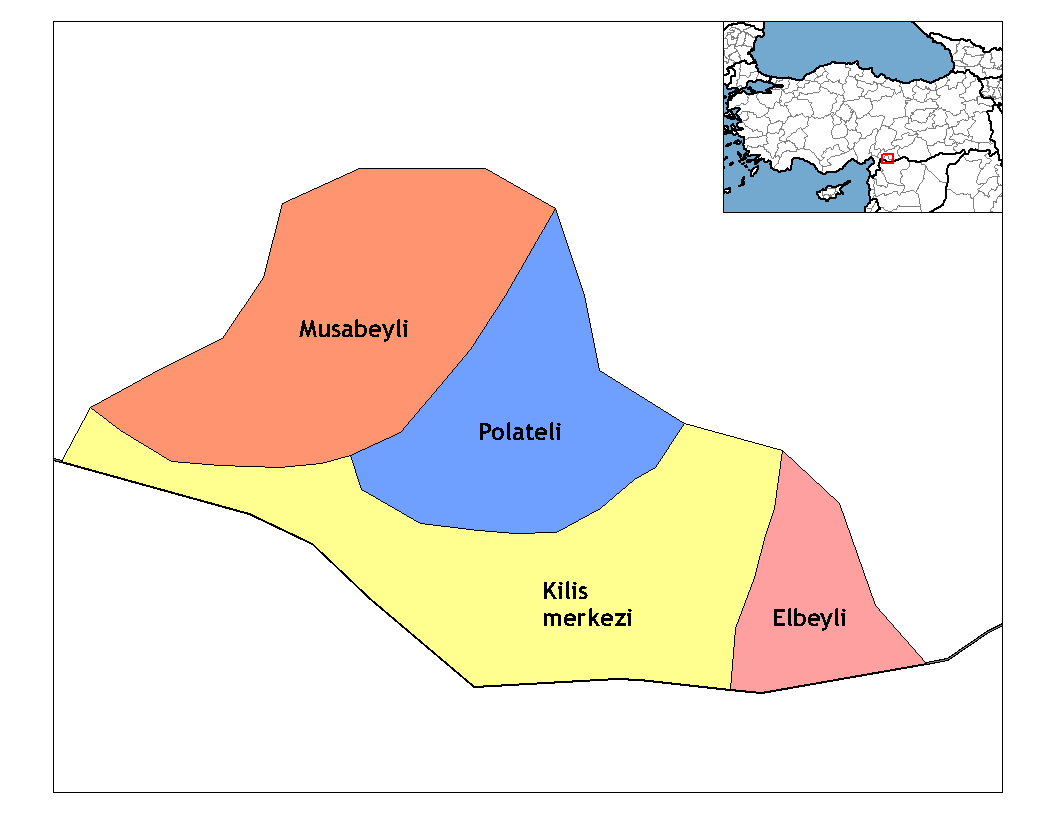
Map of the Province of Kilis, showing the provincial districts.

The Governor of Kilis (Turkish: Kilis Valiliği) is the bureaucratic state official responsible for both national government and state affairs in the Province of Kilis. Similar to the Governors of the 80 other Provinces of Turkey, the Governor of Kilis is appointed by the Government of Turkey and is responsible for the implementation of government legislation within Kilis. The Governor is also the most senior commander of both the Kilis provincial police force and the Kilis Gendarmerie.

== Appointment ==
The Governor of Kilis is appointed by the President of Turkey, who confirms the appointment after recommendation from the Turkish Government. The Ministry of the Interior first considers and puts forward possible candidates for approval by the cabinet. The Governor of Kilis is therefore not a directly elected position and instead functions as the most senior civil servant in the Province of Kilis.

=== Term limits ===
The Governor is not limited by any term limits and does not serve for a set length of time. Instead, the Governor serves at the pleasure of the Government, which can appoint or reposition the Governor whenever it sees fit. Such decisions are again made by the cabinet of Turkey. The Governor of Kilis, as a civil servant, may not have any close connections or prior experience in Kilis Province. It is not unusual for Governors to alternate between several different Provinces during their bureaucratic career.

== Functions ==
The Governor of Kilis has both bureaucratic functions and influence over local government. The main role of the Governor is to oversee the implementation of decisions by government ministries, constitutional requirements and legislation passed by Grand National Assembly within the provincial borders. The Governor also has the power to reassign, remove or appoint officials a certain number of public offices and has the right to alter the role of certain public institutions if they see fit. Governors are also the most senior public official within the Province, meaning that they preside over any public ceremonies or provincial celebrations being held due to a national holiday. As the commander of the provincial police and Gendarmerie forces, the Governor can also take decisions designed to limit civil disobedience and preserve public order. Although mayors of municipalities and councillors are elected during local elections, the Governor has the right to re-organise or to inspect the proceedings of local government despite being an unelected position.

== List of governors of Kilis ==
- Aslan Yıldırım (1995–1997)
- Güner Özmen (1997–2000)
- Teoman Ünüsan (2000–2002)
- Asım Rıza Büyüklü (2002–2003)
- Nevzat Turhan (2003–2006)
- Recep Soytürk (2006)
- Veysel Dalmaz (2006–2009)
- Turhan Ayvaz (2009–2010)
- Yusuf Odabaş (2010–2012)
- Süleyman Tapsız (2012–2016)
- İsmail Çataklı (2016–2017)
- Mehmet Tekinarslan (2017–2018)
- Recep Soytürk (2018–2023)
- Tahir Şahin (2023–2026)
- Ömer Kalaylı (2026–)

== See also ==
- Governor (Turkey)
- Kilis Province
- Ministry of the Interior (Turkey)
