= Fırlaklı, Musabeyli =

Village in Kilis Province, Turkey

Fırlaklı
- Village
- Location within Turkey
- Coordinates: 36°51′19″N 36°55′28″E
- Country: Turkey
- Province: Kilis
- District: Musabeyli
- Population (2022): 127
- Time zone: UTC+3 (TRT)

Fırlaklı is a village in the Musabeyli District, Kilis Province, Turkey. The village had a population of 127 in 2022.

The village was inhabited by Kurds in late 19th century.
