= Kapdeğirmeni, Kilis =

Village in Kilis Province, Turkey

Kapdeğirmeni
- Village
- Location within Turkey
- Coordinates: 36°43′6″N 37°13′38″E
- Country: Turkey
- Province: Kilis
- District: Kilis
- Population (2022): 79
- Time zone: UTC+3 (TRT)

Kapdeğirmeni is a village in the Kilis District, Kilis Province, Turkey. The village had a population of 79 in 2022.
