= Gülbaba, Kilis =

Village in Kilis Province, Turkey

Gülbaba
- Village
- Location within Turkey
- Coordinates: 36°50′7″N 36°47′32″E
- Country: Turkey
- Province: Kilis
- District: Kilis
- Population (2022): 871
- Time zone: UTC+3 (TRT)

Gülbaba, historically Martavan, is a village in the Kilis District, Kilis Province, Turkey. The village is inhabited by Kurds and had a population of 871 in 2022.

The village was inhabited by Kurds in late 19th century.
