= Ceritler, Kilis =

Village in Kilis Province, Turkey

Ceritler
- Village
- Location within Turkey
- Coordinates: 36°44′7″N 37°16′27″E
- Country: Turkey
- Province: Kilis
- District: Kilis
- Population (2022): 189
- Time zone: UTC+3 (TRT)

Ceritler, also known as Kantara, is a village in the Kilis District, Kilis Province, Turkey. The village had a population of 189 in 2022.
