= Yedigöz, Musabeyli =

Village in Kilis Province, Turkey

Yedigöz
- Village
- Location within Turkey
- Coordinates: 36°52′0″N 36°50′33″E
- Country: Turkey
- Province: Kilis
- District: Musabeyli
- Population (2022): 1,011
- Time zone: UTC+3 (TRT)

Yedigöz, historically Vışlar, is a village in the Musabeyli District, Kilis Province, Turkey. The village is inhabited by Kurds and had a population of 1011 in 2022.
