= Günece, Elbeyli =

Village in Kilis Province, Turkey

Günece
- Village
- Location within Turkey
- Coordinates: 36°44′17″N 37°26′33″E
- Country: Turkey
- Province: Kilis
- District: Elbeyli
- Population (2022): 37
- Time zone: UTC+3 (TRT)

Günece, formerly Havarin or Aktepe, is a village in the Elbeyli District, Kilis Province, Turkey. The village is inhabited by Turkmens of the Barak tribe and Abdals of the Maya Sekenler tribe. It had a population of 37 in 2022.
