= Polatbey, Polateli =

Village in Kilis Province, Turkey

Polatbey
- Village
- Location within Turkey
- Coordinates: 36°48′12″N 37°11′27″E
- Country: Turkey
- Province: Kilis
- District: Polateli
- Population (2022): 433
- Time zone: UTC+3 (TRT)

Polatbey, historically Cercik, is a village in the Polateli District, Kilis Province, Turkey. The village had a population of 433 in 2022.

In late 19th century, German orientalist Martin Hartmann listed the village as a settlement of 10 houses inhabited by Turks.
