= Güvendik, Elbeyli =

Village in Kilis Province, Turkey

Güvendik
- Village
- Location within Turkey
- Coordinates: 36°41′36″N 37°22′32″E
- Country: Turkey
- Province: Kilis
- District: Elbeyli
- Population (2022): 91
- Time zone: UTC+3 (TRT)

Güvendik is a village in the Elbeyli District, Kilis Province, Turkey. The village had a population of 91 in 2022.
