= Saatli, Kilis =

Village in Kilis Province, Turkey

Saatli
- Village
- Location within Turkey
- Coordinates: 36°47′16″N 36°52′19″E
- Country: Turkey
- Province: Kilis
- District: Kilis
- Population (2022): 105
- Time zone: UTC+3 (TRT)

Saatli is a village in the Kilis District, Kilis Province, Turkey. The village had a population of 105 in 2022.

In late 19th century, the village was a settlement of 7 houses inhabited by Kurds.
