= Akçağıl, Elbeyli =

Village in Kilis Province, Turkey

Akçağıl
- Village
- Location within Turkey
- Coordinates: 36°47′39″N 37°26′5″E
- Country: Turkey
- Province: Kilis
- District: Elbeyli
- Population (2022): 144
- Time zone: UTC+3 (TRT)

Akçağıl, historically Bakıt, is a village in the Elbeyli District, Kilis Province, Turkey. The village is inhabited by Abdals of the Kara Hacılar tribe and had a population of 144 in 2022.
