= Güneşli, Kilis =

Village in Kilis Province, Turkey

Güneşli
- Village
- Location within Turkey
- Coordinates: 36°48′10″N 36°52′26″E
- Country: Turkey
- Province: Kilis
- District: Kilis
- Population (2022): 177
- Time zone: UTC+3 (TRT)

Güneşli, historically Habsino, is a village in the Kilis District, Kilis Province, Turkey. The village had a population of 177 in 2022.

In late 19th century, German orientalist Martin Hartmann listed the village as a settlement of 5 houses inhabited by Kurds.
