= Çınarköy, Musabeyli =

Village in Kilis Province, Turkey

Çınarköy
- Village
- Location within Turkey
- Coordinates: 36°59′31″N 36°59′23″E
- Country: Turkey
- Province: Kilis
- District: Musabeyli
- Population (2022): 252
- Time zone: UTC+3 (TRT)

Çınarköy is a village in the Musabeyli District, Kilis Province, Turkey. The village had a population of 252 in 2022.

In late 19th century, German orientalist Martin Hartmann listed the village as a settlement of 20 houses inhabited by Turks.
