= Dümbüllü, Polateli =

Village in Kilis Province, Turkey

Dümbüllü
- Village
- Location within Turkey
- Coordinates: 36°48′55″N 37°01′39″E
- Country: Turkey
- Province: Kilis
- District: Polateli
- Population (2022): 125
- Time zone: UTC+3 (TRT)

Dümbüllü is a village in the Polateli District, Kilis Province, Turkey. The village had a population of 125 in 2022.

In late 19th century, German orientalist Martin Hartmann listed the village as a settlement of 10 houses inhabited by Turks.
