= Beşikkaya, Kilis =

Village in Kilis Province, Turkey

Beşikkaya
- Village
- Location within Turkey
- Coordinates: 36°42′59″N 37°11′57″E
- Country: Turkey
- Province: Kilis
- District: Kilis
- Population (2022): 338
- Time zone: UTC+3 (TRT)

Beşikkaya is a village in the Kilis District, Kilis Province, Turkey. The village had a population of 338 in 2022.
