= Musabeyli =

- Municipality
- Location in Turkey
- Coordinates: 36°53′09″N 36°55′05″E
- Country: Turkey
- Province: Kilis
- District: Musabeyli

Government
  - Mayor: Mehmet Ölmez (MHP)
- Population (2022): 1,155
- Time zone: UTC+3 (TRT)
- Area code: 0348
- Website: www.musabeyli.bel.tr

Musabeyli, formerly Murat Höyük, is a town and the seat of the Musabeyli District in the Kilis Province of Turkey. Its population is 1,155 (2022).

== Demographics ==
The town is populated by both Kurds and Turks.
