= Taşlıbakar, Elbeyli =

Village in Kilis Province, Turkey

Taşlıbakar
- Village
- Location within Turkey
- Coordinates: 36°41′40″N 37°24′10″E
- Country: Turkey
- Province: Kilis
- District: Elbeyli
- Population (2022): 67
- Time zone: UTC+3 (TRT)

Taşlıbakar is a village in the Elbeyli District, Kilis Province, Turkey. The village had a population of 67 in 2022.
