= Polateli District =

- District
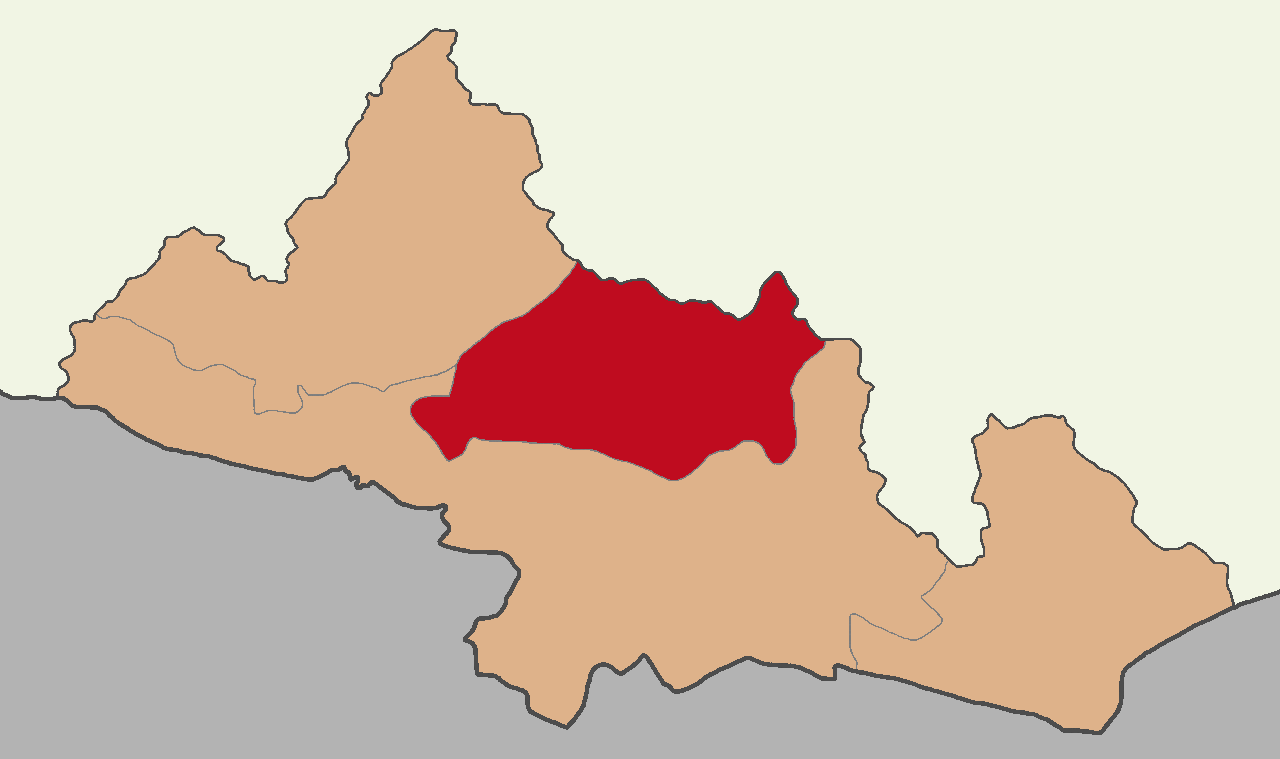
- Map showing Polateli District in Kilis Province

- Location in Turkey
- Coordinates: 36°50′36″N 37°8′39″E
- Country: Turkey
- Province: Kilis
- Seat: Polateli
- Area: 218 km^{2} (84 sq mi)
- Population (2022): 4,856
  - Density: 22/km^{2} (58/sq mi)
- Time zone: UTC+3 (TRT)
- Website: www.polateli.gov.tr

Polateli District is a district of Kilis Province of Turkey. Its seat is the town Polateli. It had a total population of 4,856 in 2022. Its area is 218 km^{2}. It has a population density of 22.51/km² as of 2022.

== Composition ==
There is one municipality in Polateli District:

- Polateli

There are 16 villages in Polateli District:

- Bağarası
- Bektaşoğlu
- Belenözü
- Dümbüllü
- Eğlen
- Kızılgöl
- Ömercik
- Ömeroğlu
- Polatbey
- Söğütlü
- Taşlıalan
- Ürünlü
- Yeniyapan
- Yeniyurt
- Yeşilpınar
- Yılanca
