= Kilis District =

- District
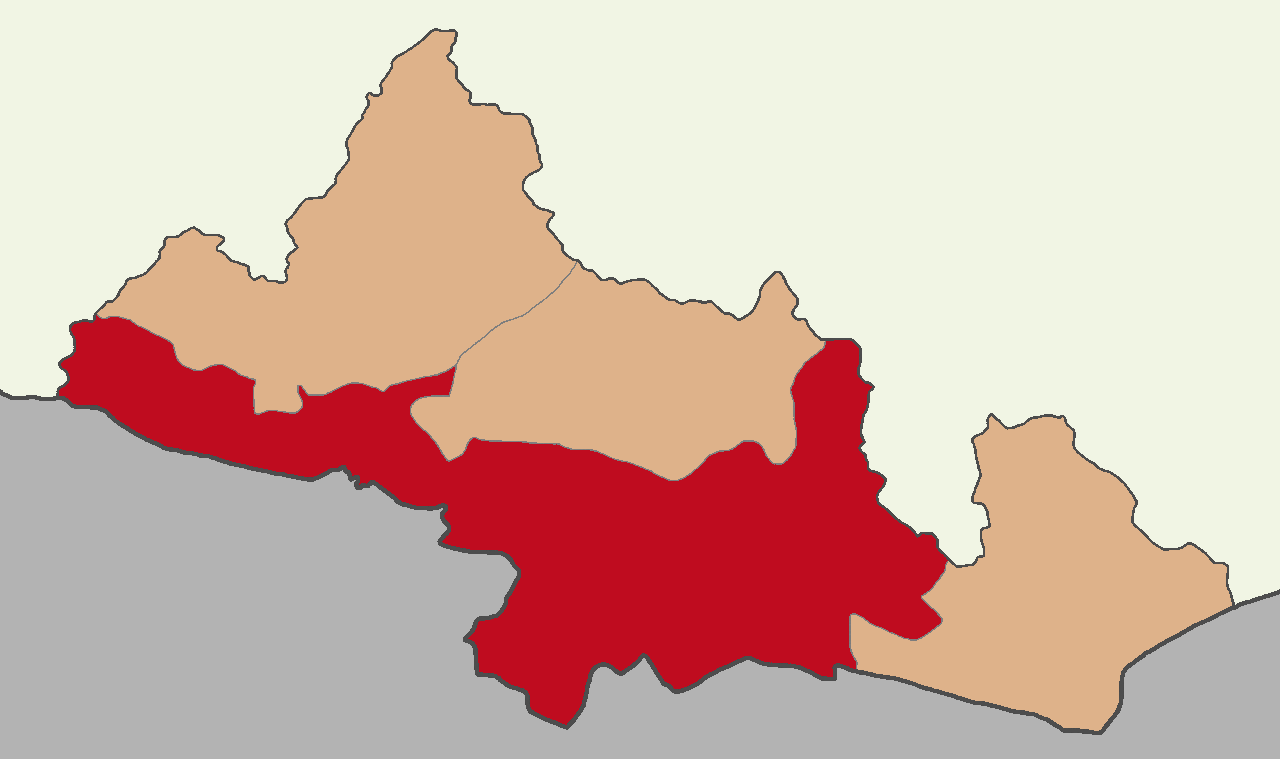
- Map showing Kilis District in Kilis Province

- Location in Turkey
- Coordinates: 36°42′57″N 37°6′54″E
- Country: Turkey
- Province: Kilis
- Seat: Kilis
- Area: 610 km^{2} (240 sq mi)
- Population (2022): 125,079
  - Density: 210/km^{2} (530/sq mi)
- Time zone: UTC+3 (TRT)

Kilis District (also: Merkez, meaning "central" in Turkish) is a district of Kilis Province of Turkey. Its seat is the city Kilis. It had a total population of 125,079 in 2022. Its area is 610 km^{2}.

== Composition ==
There is one municipality in Kilis District:

- Kilis

There are 53 villages in Kilis District:

- Acar
- Akçabağlar
- Akıncı
- Alatepe
- Arpakesmez
- Başmağara
- Beşenli
- Beşikkaya
- Bozcayazı
- Bulamaçlı
- Büyükkonak
- Çakallıpınar
- Çalkaya
- Çerçili
- Ceritler
- Çörten
- Çukuroba
- Deliçay
- Deliosman
- Demirciler
- Demirışık
- Doğançay
- Dölek
- Duruca
- Göktaş
- Gözkaya
- Gülbaba
- Gümüşsuyu
- Güneşli
- Güvenli
- Hacipoğlu
- Hisar
- İnanlı
- Kapdeğirmeni
- Karacaören
- Karaçavuş
- Karamelik
- Kocabeyli
- Küçükkonak
- Küplüce
- Kuskunkıran
- Kuzuini
- Mağaracık
- Mehmetali
- Mısırcık
- Narlıca
- Saatli
- Süngütepe
- Tahtalı
- Tamburalı
- Topdağı
- Uzunlu
- Yavuzlu
