= Uzunlu, Kilis =

Village in Kilis Province, Turkey

Uzunlu
- Village
- Location within Turkey
- Coordinates: 36°46′4″N 37°13′17″E
- Country: Turkey
- Province: Kilis
- District: Kilis
- Population (2022): 303
- Time zone: UTC+3 (TRT)

Uzunlu is a village in the Kilis District, Kilis Province, Turkey. The village had a population of 303 in 2022.
