= Madenyolu, Musabeyli =

Village in Kilis Province, Turkey

Madenyolu
- Village
- Location within Turkey
- Coordinates: 36°55′18″N 36°54′35″E
- Country: Turkey
- Province: Kilis
- District: Musabeyli
- Population (2022): 170
- Time zone: UTC+3 (TRT)

Madenyolu is a village in the Musabeyli District, Kilis Province, Turkey. The village had a population of 170 in 2022.
