= Tamburalı, Kilis =

Village in Kilis Province, Turkey

Tamburalı
- Village
- Location in Turkey
- Coordinates: 36°45′54″N 37°6′28″E
- Country: Turkey
- Province: Kilis
- District: Kilis
- Population (2022): 24
- Time zone: UTC+3 (TRT)

Tamburalı is a village in the Kilis District, Kilis Province, Turkey. The village is inhabited by Turkmens and had a population of 24 in 2022.

In late 19th century, German orientalist Martin Hartmann listed the village as a settlement of 10 houses inhabited by Turks.
