= Bağarası, Polateli =

Village in Kilis Province, Turkey

Bağarası
- Village
- Location within Turkey
- Coordinates: 36°49′47″N 37°3′21″E
- Country: Turkey
- Province: Kilis
- District: Polateli
- Population (2022): 536
- Time zone: UTC+3 (TRT)

Bağarası, historically Cengin, is a village in the Polateli District, Kilis Province, Turkey. The village is inhabited by Turkmens of the Çavuşlu tribe and had a population of 536 in 2022.

In late 19th century, German orientalist Martin Hartmann listed the village as a settlement of 40 houses inhabited by Turks.
