= Alahan, Elbeyli =

Village in Kilis Province, Turkey

Alahan
- Village
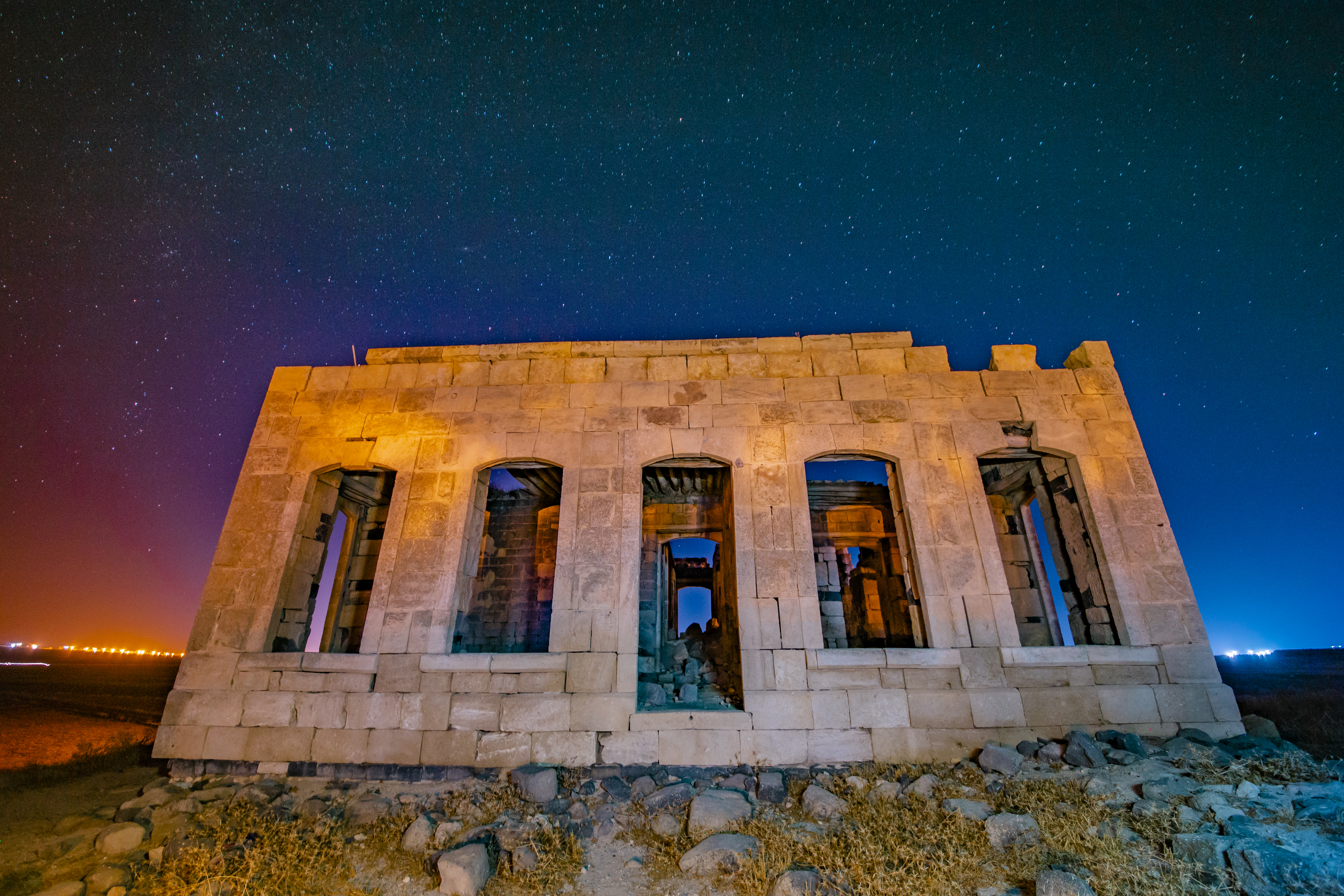
- Traditional stone house in Alahan

- Location within Turkey
- Coordinates: 36°39′51″N 37°26′17″E
- Country: Turkey
- Province: Kilis
- District: Elbeyli
- Population (2022): 383
- Time zone: UTC+3 (TRT)

Alahan is a village in the Elbeyli District, Kilis Province, Turkey. It had a population of 383 in 2022. The village is inhabited by Turkmens of the Elbegli tribe.

== Demographics ==
Historical population
| Year | Pop. | ±% p.a. |
|---|---|---|
| 1990 | 777 | — |
| 1997 | 721 | −1.06% |
| 2007 | 498 | −3.63% |
| 2012 | 464 | −1.40% |
| 2017 | 404 | −2.73% |
| 2022 | 383 | −1.06% |
Source: 1990 census, 1997 census and TÜIK (2007-2022)
