= Tahtalı, Kilis =

Village in Kilis Province, Turkey

Tahtalı
- Village
- Location within Turkey
- Coordinates: 36°43′33″N 37°4′24″E
- Country: Turkey
- Province: Kilis
- District: Kilis
- Population (2022): 144
- Time zone: UTC+3 (TRT)

Tahtalı is a village in the Kilis District, Kilis Province, Turkey. The village had a population of 144 in 2022.
