= Musabeyli District =

- District
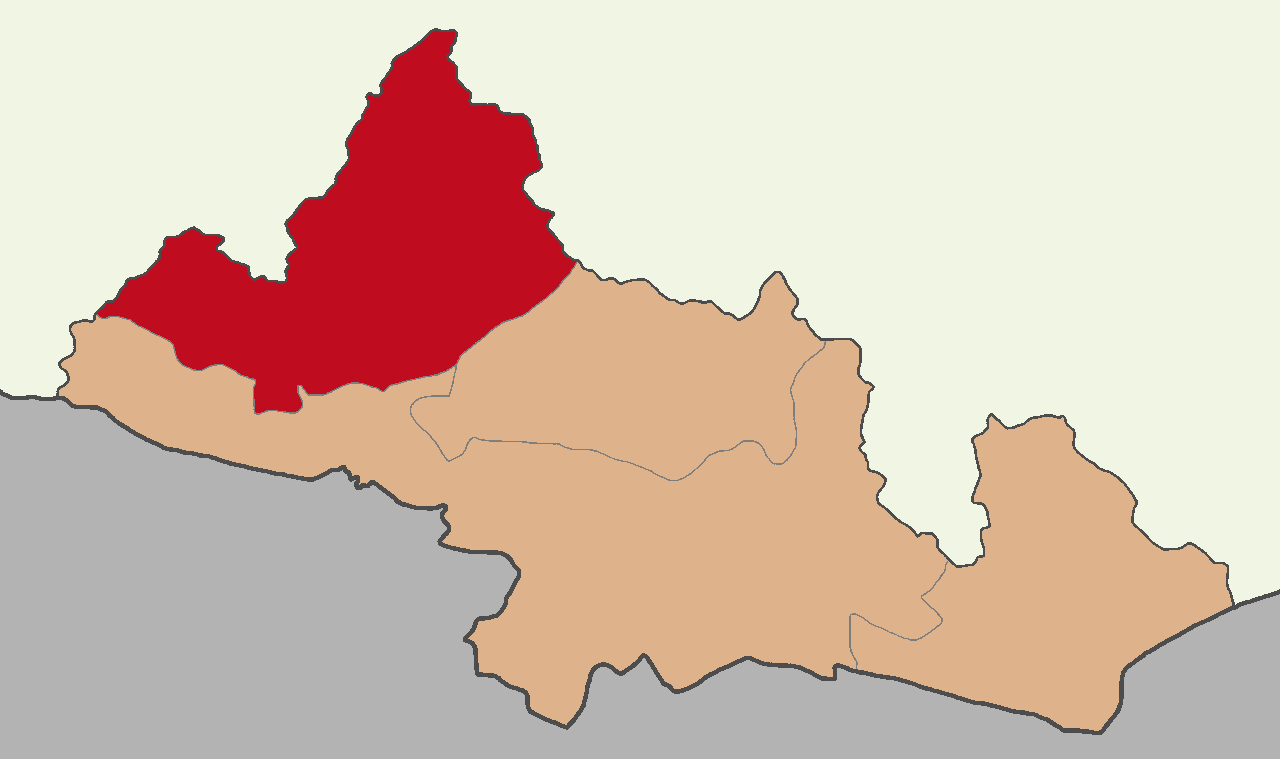
- Map showing Musabeyli District in Kilis Province

- Location in Turkey
- Coordinates: 36°53′11″N 36°55′6″E
- Country: Turkey
- Province: Kilis
- Seat: Musabeyli
- Area: 346 km^{2} (134 sq mi)
- Population (2022): 12,390
  - Density: 36/km^{2} (93/sq mi)
- Time zone: UTC+3 (TRT)
- Website: www.musabeyli.gov.tr

Musabeyli District is a district of Kilis Province of Turkey. Its seat is the town Musabeyli. The district is mostly populated by Turks but also Kurds, Romani people and Arabs. It had a total population of 12,390 in 2022. Its area is 346 km^{2}.

== Composition ==
There is one municipality in Musabeyli District:

- Musabeyli

There are 46 villages in Musabeyli District:

- Ağcakent
- Aşağıbademli
- Aşağıkalecik
- Balıklı
- Belentepe
- Bozkaya
- Çayıraltı
- Çınarköy
- Dorucak
- Dutluca
- Fericek
- Fırlaklı
- Geçitboyu
- Gökmusa
- Gözlüce
- Gündeğer
- Hacılar
- Hasancalı
- Haydarlar
- Hüseyinoğlu
- Karadut
- Karbeyaz
- Kayapınar
- Kaynaklı
- Kızılkent
- Koçcağız
- Kolpınar
- Körahmethüyüğü
- Kozlubağ
- Kurtaran
- Kürtüncü
- Madenyolu
- Sabanlı
- Şenlikçe
- Tahtalıkaradut
- Tokaçgemriği
- Topallar
- Üçpınar
- Uğurtepe
- Yastıca
- Yedigöz
- Yeşiloba
- Yukarıbademli
- Yukarıkalecik
- Yuvabaşı
- Zeytinbağı

== History ==
Out of the 74 settlements he listed in the Ottoman nahiyah of Musabekli, 19th-century traveler Martin Hartmann noted 41 as Turkish (with a total of 554 households), 25 as Kurdish (247 households), 1 as Turkish and Abdal mixed (10 households), and 7 without any information on the population.
