= Elbegli =

Turkoman tribe

Elbeyli

Regions with significant populations
- Turkey: Kilis, Gaziantep, Sivas; Syria: Aleppo; Iran: Azerbaijan

Languages
- Turkish

Religion
- Sunni Islam

Related ethnic groups
- Turkish people, Syrian Turkmen, Azerbaijanis

Elbegli (Turkish: Elbeyli or İlbeyli) is a Turkoman tribe mainly residing in Kilis, Gaziantep, and Sivas provinces in Turkey.

== History ==
The tribe was mainly found around Sivas and Kemah before the Ottoman authorities resettled them near Sajur River during the 18th centuries. In mid-18th century, Carsten Niebuhr noted that the Elbeglis were 2 thousand tents in total, one half dwelling near Sivas and the other near Aleppo. They were noted to be living north of Tadef in Syria by Christian missionaries in 1862. Throughout the 18th century, smaller communities of Elbegli appeared in the Ottoman records for the regions of Adana, Antakya, Latakia, and Harran. The administrative divisions within the Ottoman Empire that Elbegli densely settled were named after the tribe. The Ottoman vilayet of Aleppo included Elbegli nahiyah and Sivas vilayet included Elbegli kaza.

== Demographics ==
In Sivas Province, Elbegli tribe inhabits the city of Sivas and 42 villages to the southwest of the city, towards Şarkışla. There are also several other villages spread out in other parts of the province. There are 20 historically Elbegli-inhabited villages in Tokat. The tribe inhabits at least 15 villages in Kilis and 13 villages in Gaziantep. In Syria, there are 30 Elbegli-inhabited villages near the Turkish border as well as 68 villages that the Elbegli settled but were Arabized, near Manbij and Raqqa. There are smaller numbers of Elbegli villages in the provinces of Yozgat, Kars, Iğdır, and Ordu.

== Notable people ==
- Adil Şan, Syrian-Turkish poet
- Şahin Bey, Turkish militia leader in the Siege of Aintab
