= Kilis Province =

Coordinates: 36°48′03″N 37°07′26″E

Kilis Province Kilis ili
- Province
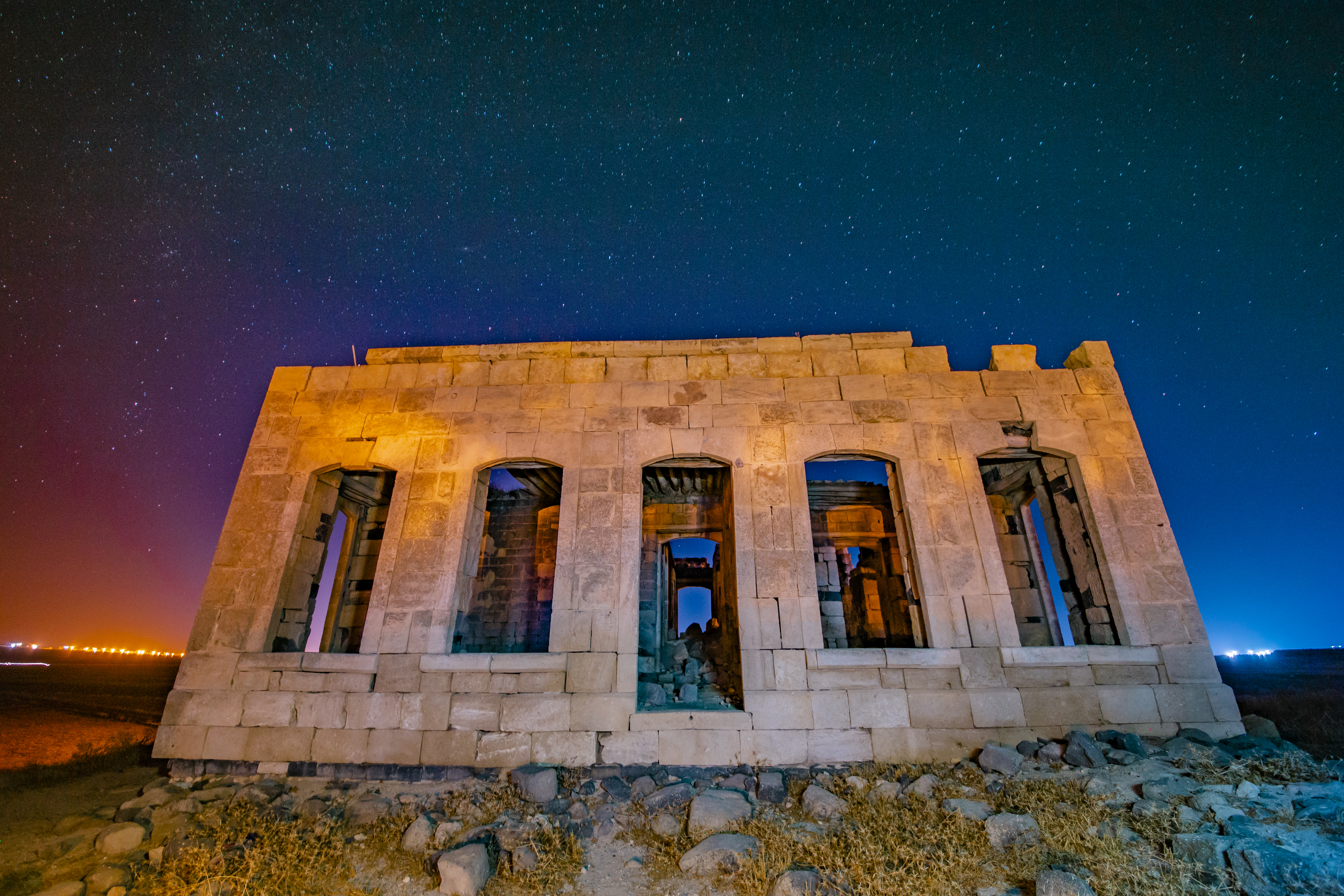
- A stone house in Alahan, a village on the Syrian border

- Logo

- Location of the province within Turkey
- Country: Turkey
- Seat: Kilis

Government
  - Governor: Ömer Kalaylı
- Area: 1,412 km^{2} (545 sq mi)
- Population (2022): 147,919
  - Density: 104.8/km^{2} (271.3/sq mi)
- Time zone: UTC+3 (TRT)
- Area code: 0348
- Website: www.kilis.gov.tr

Kilis Province (Turkish: Kilis ili) is a province in southern Turkey, on the border with Syria. Its area is 1,412 km^{2}, and its population is 147,919 (2022). The province was created in 1995 from the southern part of Gaziantep Province. The city of Kilis is home to over 75% of the inhabitants of the province; the other towns and villages are very small.

== Districts ==
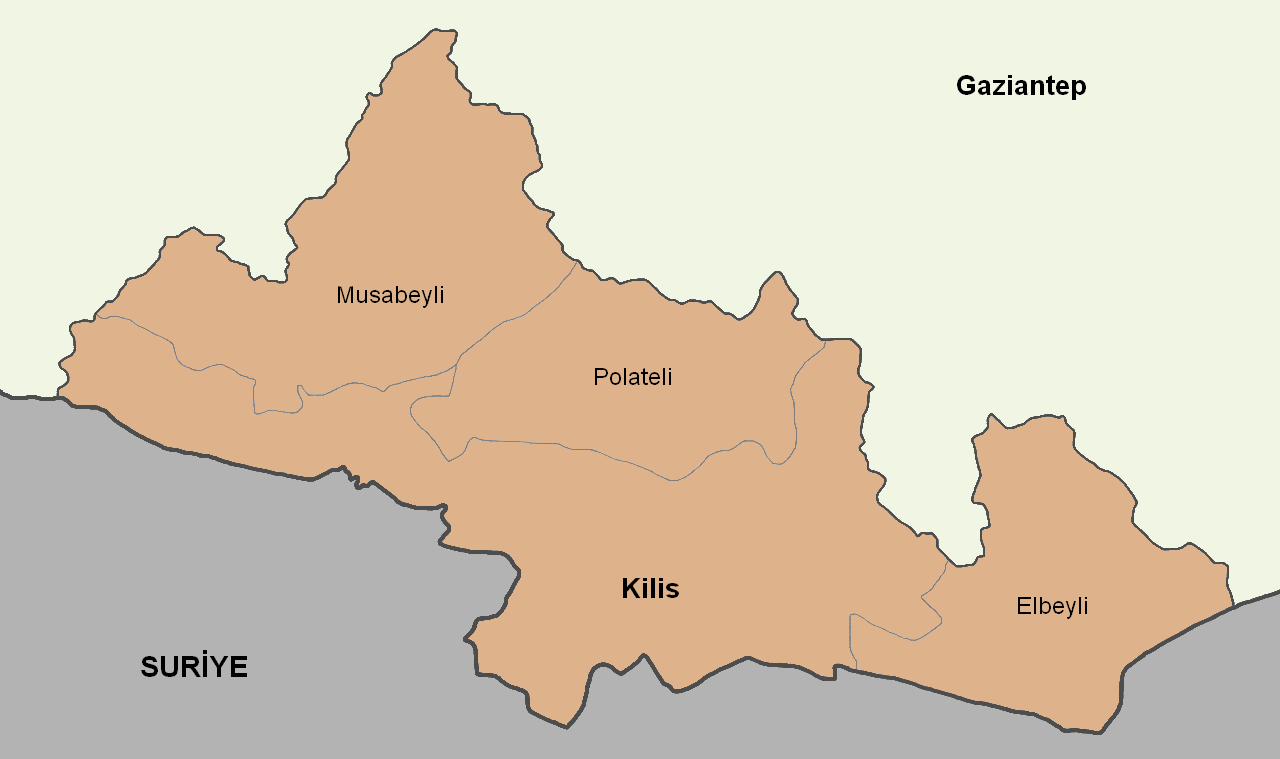

The province is divided into 4 districts, listed below with their official estimates of population as of 2022: Elbeyli District (5,594), Kilis District (the capital district) (125,079), Musabeyli District (12,390) and Polateli District (4,856).

== See also ==
- List of populated places in Kilis Province
- Kilis quilts
