= 1450s in architecture =

List of years in architecture	(table)
- … 1440; 1441; 1442; 1443; 1444; 1445; 1446; 1447; 1448; 1449; 1450; 1451; 1452; 1453; 1454; 1455; 1456; 1457; 1458; 1459; 1460 …
- Buildings and structures: Art; Archaeology; Architecture; Literature; Music; Philosophy; Science; +...

- 1440s
- 1450s in architecture
- 1460s
Other topics in 1450s:
- Art

== Events ==
- 1452 – Leon Battista Alberti completes writing De Re Aedificatoria

== Buildings and structures ==
=== Buildings ===
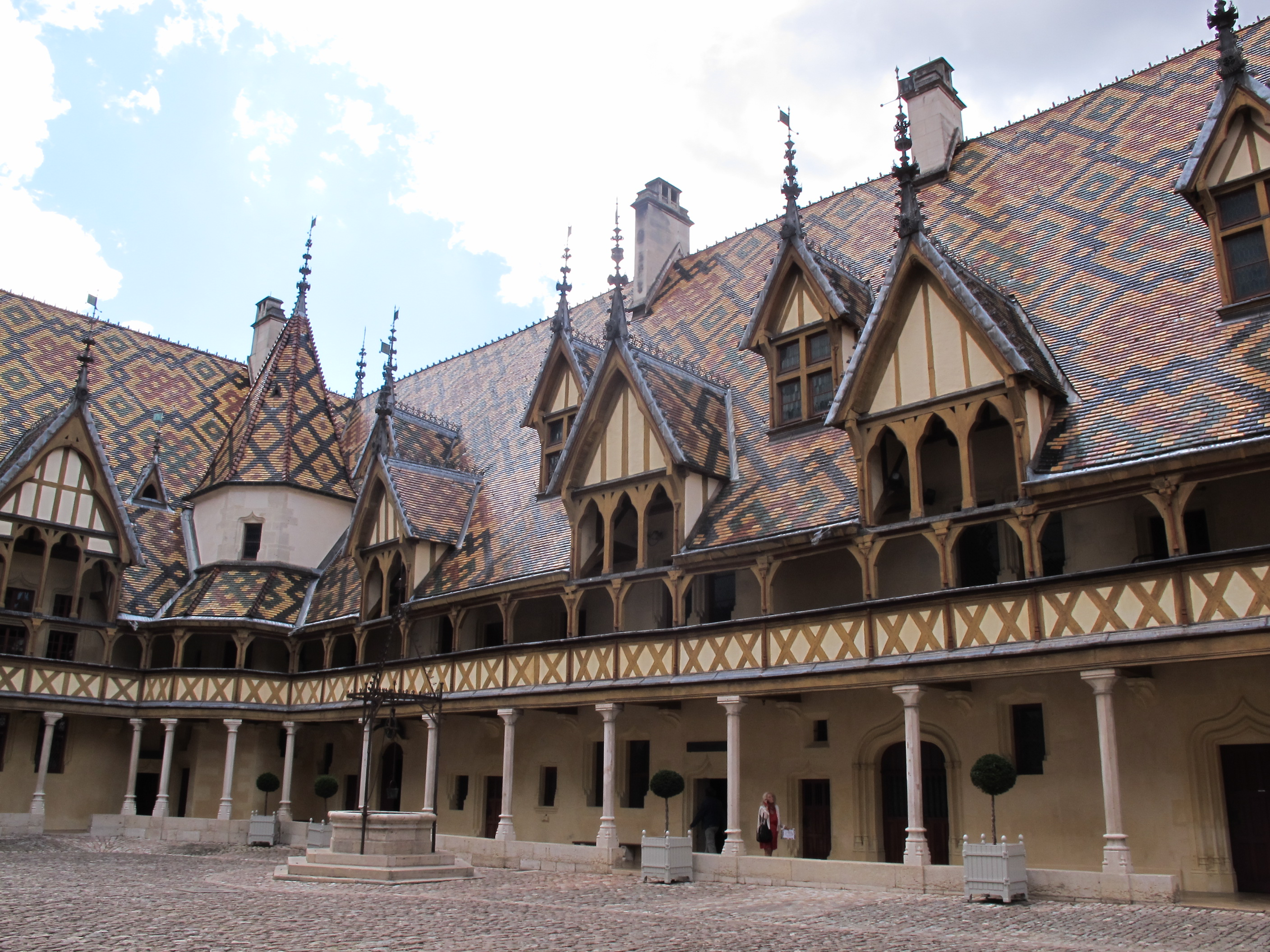
Hospices de Beaune

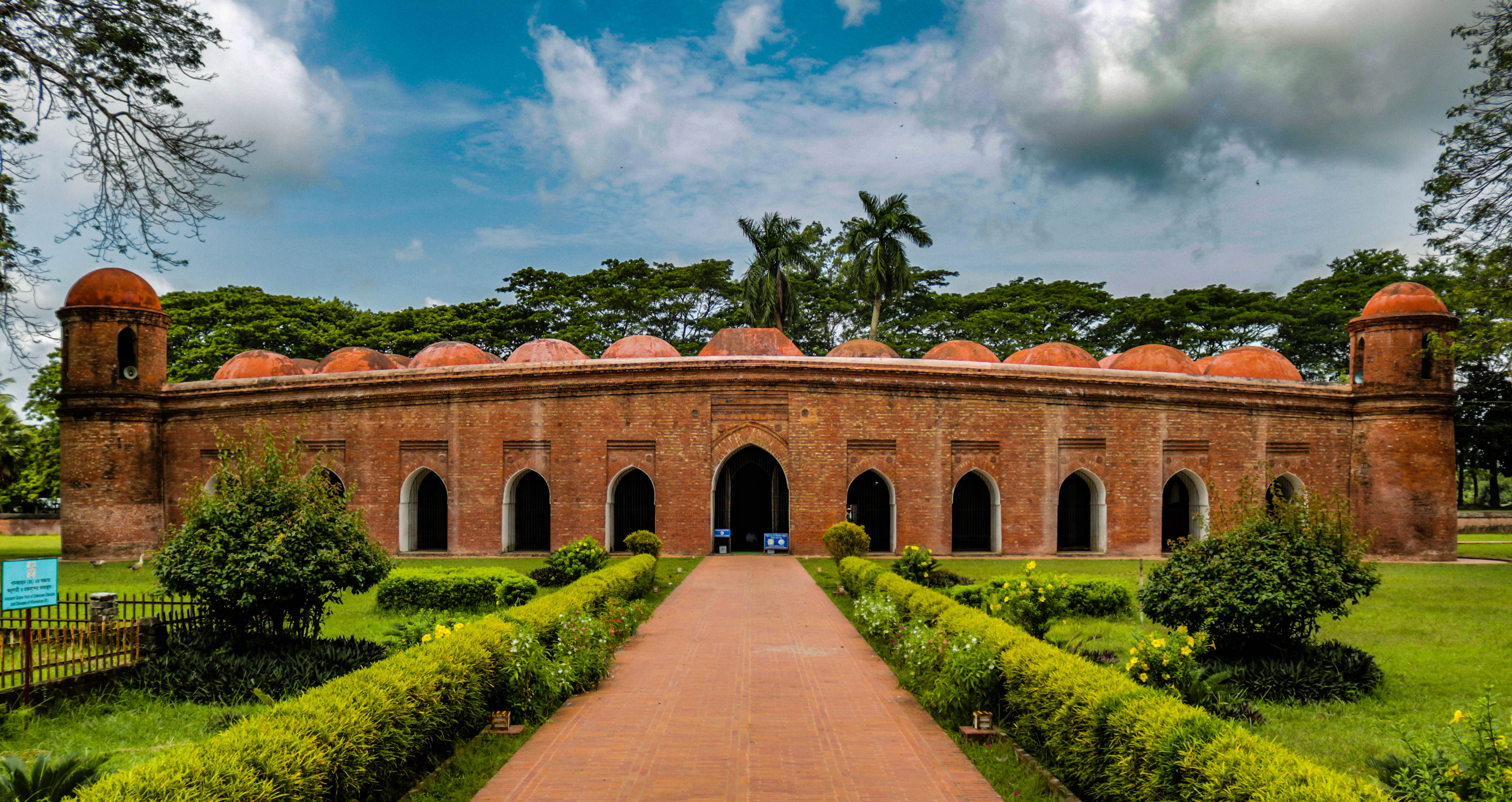
Sixty Dome Mosque

- 1450
  - Reconstruction of Sforza Castle in Milan as a palace begun
  - Tomb of Ahi Evren in Kırşehir, Anatolia, is begun
- 1451–1457 – Villa Medici in Fiesole, Tuscany, designed by Michelozzo or Leon Battista Alberti, built
- c. 1451
  - Palazzo Rucellai in Florence, probably designed by Leon Battista Alberti and executed, at least in part, by Bernardo Rossellino, substantially completed
  - Earliest date for start of construction of Jahaz Mahal in the Delhi Sultanate
- 1452 – Hospices de Beaune in France, probably designed by Jacques Wiscrère, opened
- 1456 – Ospedale Maggiore in Milan begun by Filarete.
- 1457 – Edo Castle in Japan first fortified by Ōta Dōkan
- 1458 – Pitti Palace in Florence begun by Bartolommeo Ammanati and perhaps Brunelleschi
- 1459 – Sixty Dome Mosque (Shaṭ Gombuj Moshjid) in Khalifatabad (modern-day Bagerhat District of Bangladesh) completed
- Approximate date – Palazzo Pisani Moretta on the Grand Canal (Venice) built

== Births ==
- 1450: Bartolomeo Montagna, Italian painter and architect (died 1523)
- 1452: April 15 – Leonardo da Vinci, Italian polymath (died 1519)
- c. 1456: Bramantino, born Bartolomeo Suardi, Milanese painter and architect (died c. 1530)

== Deaths ==
- 1459: c. October 25 – Khan Jahan Ali, Muslim Sufi saint, local ruler and architectural patron
