= 1440s in architecture =

List of years in architecture	(table)
- … 1430; 1431; 1432; 1433; 1434; 1435; 1436; 1437; 1438; 1439; 1440; 1441; 1442; 1443; 1444; 1445; 1446; 1447; 1448; 1449; 1450 …
- Buildings and structures: Art; Archaeology; Architecture; Literature; Music; Philosophy; Science; +...

- 1430s
- 1440s in architecture
- 1450s
Other topics in 1440s:
- Art

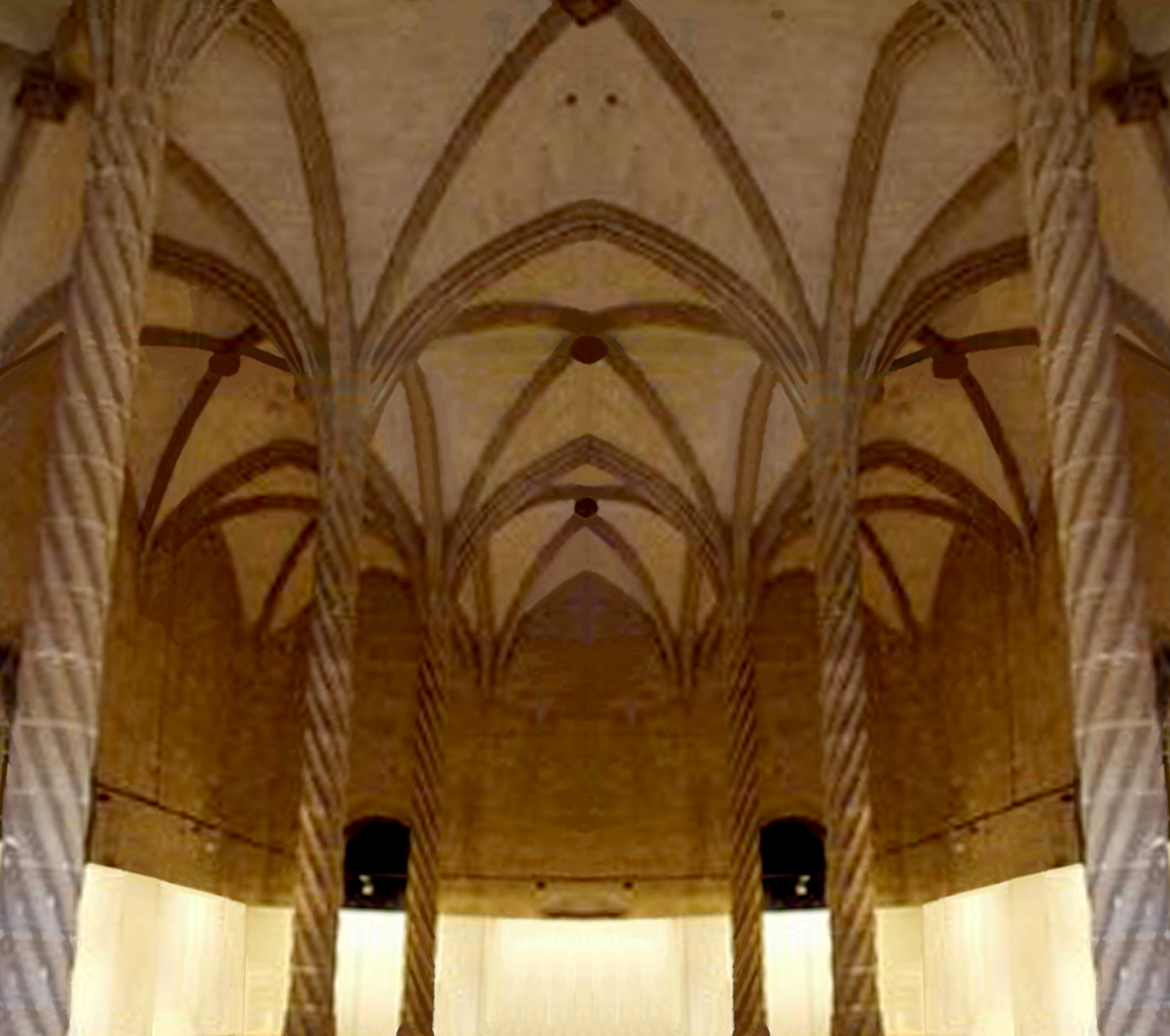
Palma's Silk Exchange

== Buildings and structures ==
=== Buildings ===
- 1440s
  - Great Tower of Tattershall Castle, Lincolnshire, England, is probably largely completed.
  - Wilcote Chapel of St Mary's Church, North Leigh, Oxfordshire, England, is built.
- 1440
  - Guildhall, London, is completed.
  - Sidi Yahya Mosque in Timbuktu is completed.
  - St. Nicolai, Lüneburg, is completed.
- 1441
  - The nave of the Church of the Holy Spirit, Heidelberg, Germany (begun in 1410), is completed.
  - Construction of Herstmonceux Castle in England is begun.
- 1442
  - The Porta della Carta, built by Giovanni and his son Bartolomeo Bon, completes the Doge's Palace, Venice.
  - Chapel of All Souls College, Oxford, consecrated.

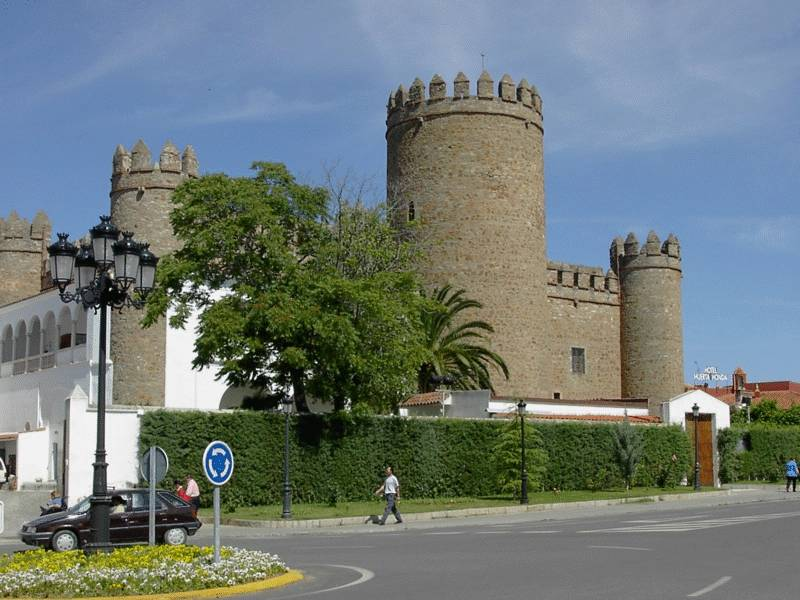
Castle of Zafra (Badajoz)

- 1443 – The Castle of Zafra is completed.
- 1445
  - Church of San Pablo, Valladolid is begun.
  - Palazzo Medici in Florence is begun by Michelozzo.
- 1446
  - July 25 – The foundation stone of King's College Chapel, Cambridge, England is laid by King Henry VI of England.
  - Precious Belt Bridge in China reconstructed.
  - Approximate date
    - Jama Masjid of Herat in Afghanistan is completed
    - Construction of Palazzo Rucellai in Florence, probably designed by Leon Battista Alberti and executed, at least in part, by Bernardo Rossellino, is begun.
    - Construction of Ockwells Manor in Berkshire, England, is begun.
- 1446–1450 – Reconstruction of choir of Mont Saint Michel Abbey in Normandy is begun.
- c. 1447 – Llotja dels Mercaders (Silk Exchange) in Palma, Majorca, designed by Guillem Sagrera, completed.

== Births ==
- c. 1440 – Reginald Bray born in Worcester, England (d. 1503)
- c. 1443 – Giuliano da Sangallo born in Florence (d. 1516)
- c. 1444 – Donato Bramante born in Monte Asdrualdo (modern-day Fermignano), Italy (d. 1514)

== Deaths ==
- 1446: April 16 – Filippo Brunelleschi dies in Florence (b. 1377)
