= Kesikköprü =

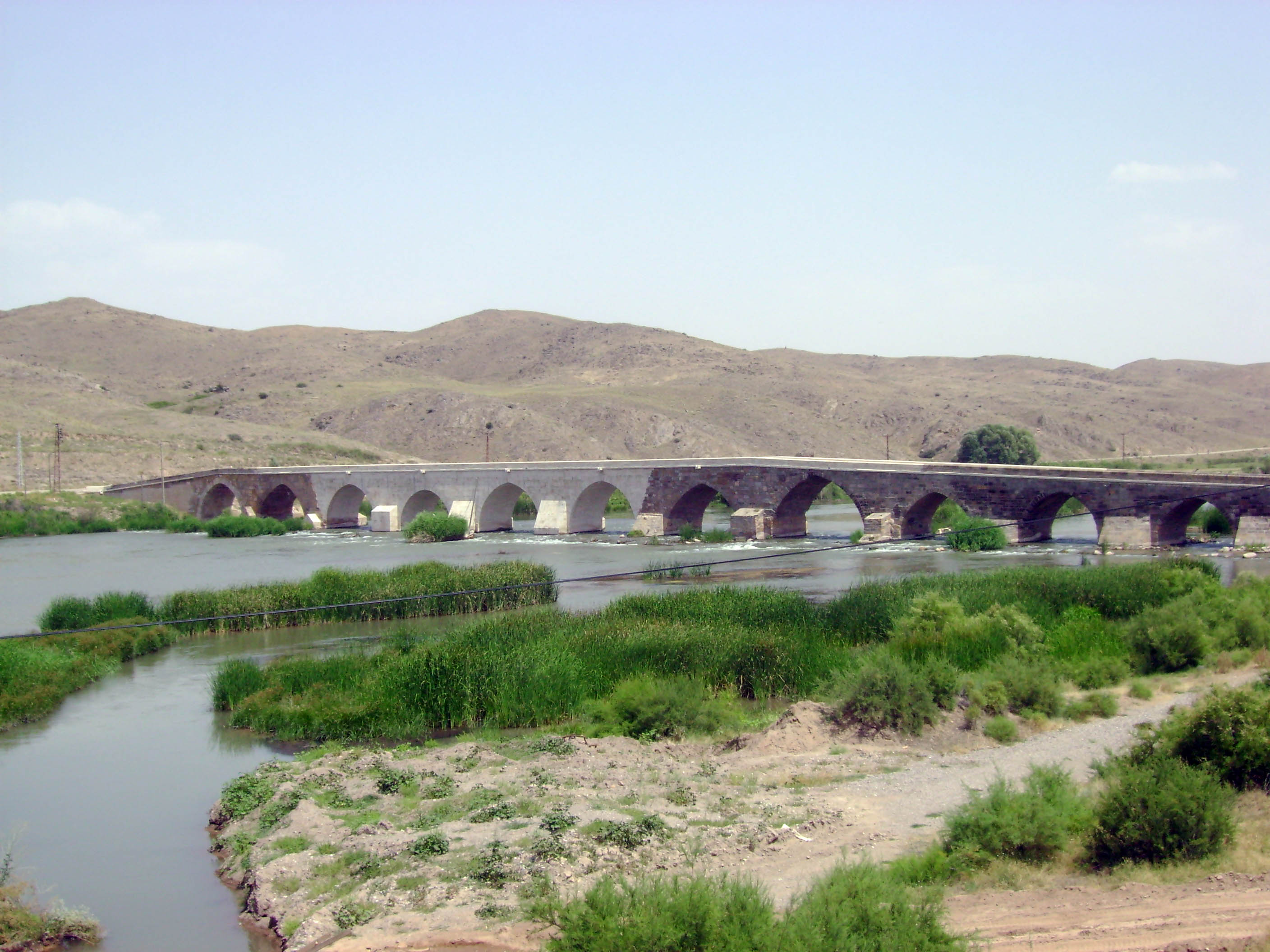
Kesikköprü from the West

Kesikköprü Bridge (literally "Broken bridge") is a historical bridge in Central Anatolia, Turkey.

The bridge is situated in Kırşehir Province at 38°57′42″N 34°11′57″E. It is to the south of the village with the same name and over Kızılırmak River (Hallys of the antiquity). It is to the north of the Kesikköprü Dam Its elevation with respect to sea level is 860 metres (2,820 ft) and its length is 220 metres (720 ft).

According to the inscription of the bridge on the east side it was constructed by Kaykaus II of The Seljuks of Anatolia in 1248.

Although the original material is limestone in a later restoration, other types of stones were used. The bridge is an arch type bridge with 13 arches. The feet under the arches are supported by triangular bulges. Although it is still standing the road now passes over a modern bridge constructed about 180 metres (590 ft) to the west.
