= Aşık Pasha Mausoleum =

Türbe (Islamic mausoleum) in Turkey

Coordinates: 39°09′05″N 34°10′10″E

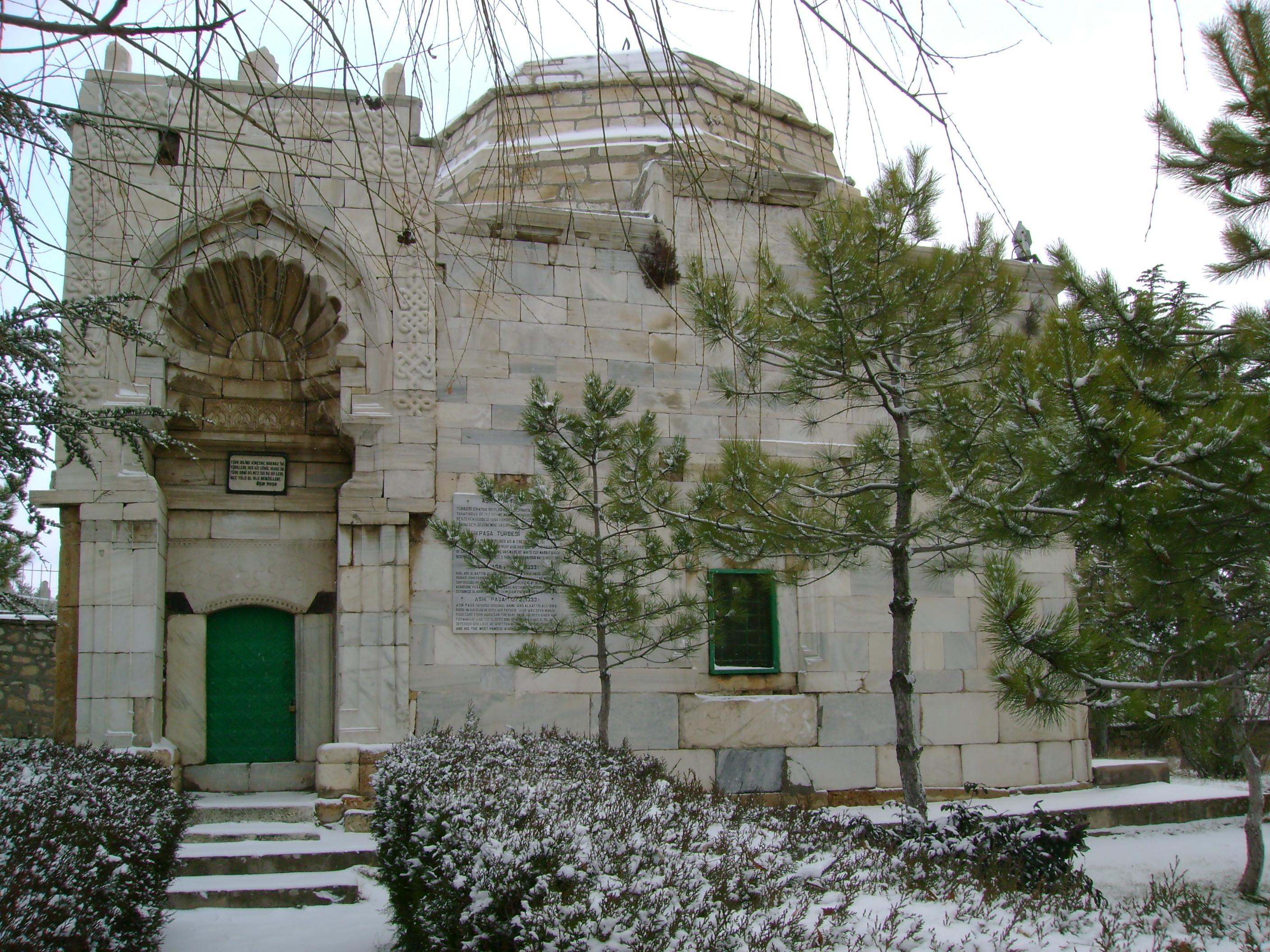
Aşık Pasha Mausoleum in Kırşehir.

Aşık Pasha Mausoleum (Turkish: Âşık Paşa Türbesi) is a monument at the burial site of the 14th-century Turkish sufi poet Aşık Pasha (died 1332), located in Kırşehir, Turkey.
