= Ahi Evran =

Turkic scholar and leader of the Ahi Brotherhood (1169–1261)

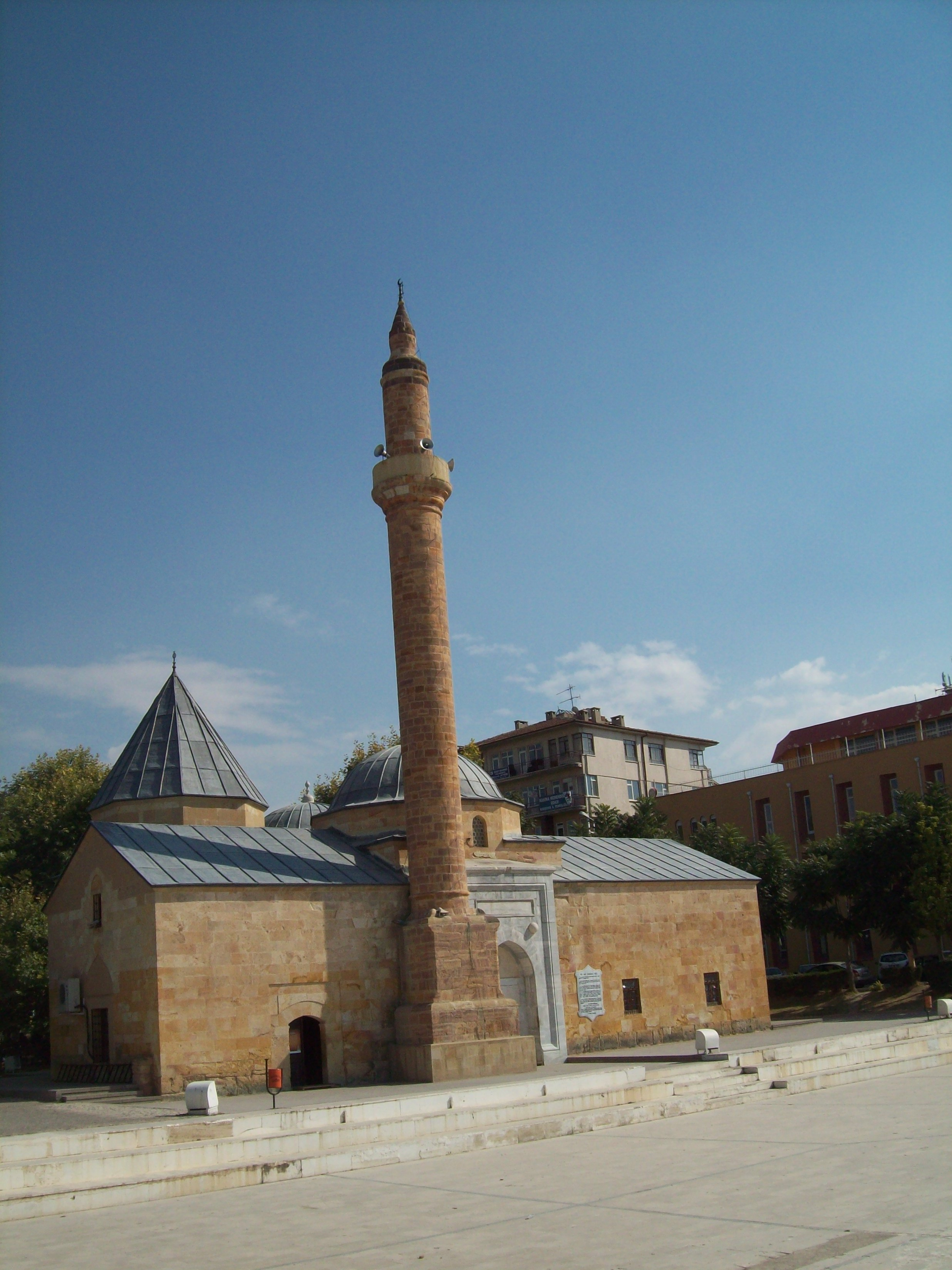
Tomb of Ahi Evren in Kırşehir, Turkey

Sheikh Pir Nasiruddin Abul Hakayik Pir Mahmud bin Ahmed Ahi Evran bin Abbas Veli al-Khoyi (1169–1261), commonly known as Ahi Evran or Pir Ahi Evren-ı Veli, was a Turkish Bektashi Sufi saint, preacher, philosopher and poet who wrote 20 books. He is mostly remembered as the founder and leader of the Ahi Brotherhood.

== Life ==
Born in Khoy, Iranian Azerbaijan in 1169, he moved to Kayseri, Turkey and established the Ahi guild there. He was skilled in the leatherworking trade and he organized guilds from 32 different professions. He led and organized the Ahis into a force capable of fighting the invading Mongols.

He was a Bektashi preacher who had gone to Trabzon during the Empire of Trebizond to spread Islam. As a scholar, he was taught by teachers in Baghdad and Khorasan.

He was killed by Mongols in Kırşehir on 1 April 1261. His grave site is in debate, but thought to be in Boztepe. The site is near Trabzon. It is considered as sacred and has been visited by many people. This grave, however, may instead be that of a clan leader or a Greek metropolitan who had accepted Islam. According to Şakir Şevket, in 1863, Muslim preacher Sheykh Haji Hakki Efendi was inspired to build a place near Ahi Evren's grave. So when Sheykh Haji Hakki Efendi died in 1890, he was buried there. The government then built a tomb and mosque at the site.

== Legacy ==
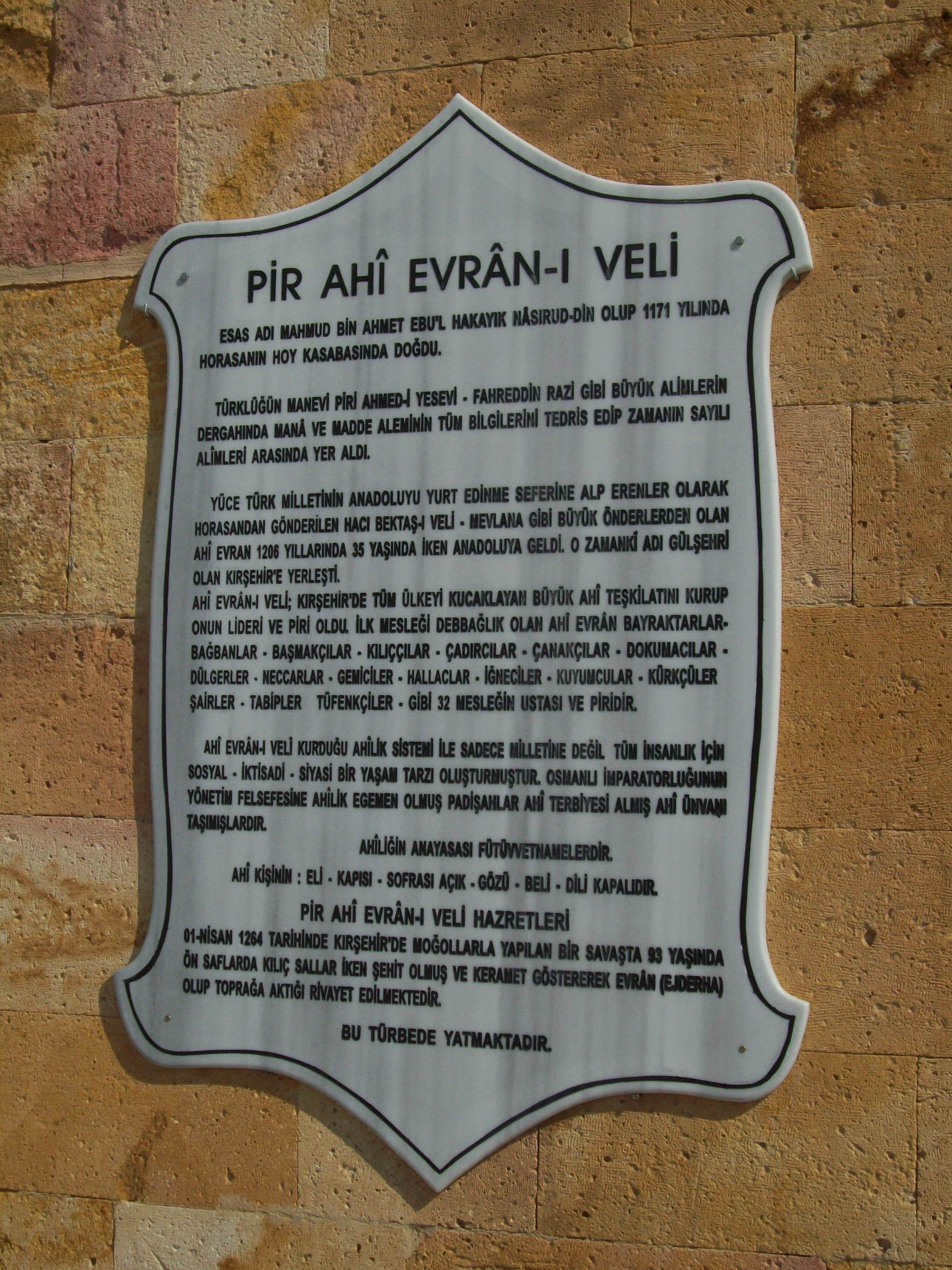
Information about Ahi Evren at his tomb

A new insect species discovered in Turkey by assistant professor Mahmut Erbey at Ahi Evran University was named Evrani to honor the university and the saint. An annual festival is held in Kırşehir, where its organized by the local chambers of commerce.

A museum in Kayseri, the Ahi Evran Esnaf ve Sanatkarlar Müzesi, is dedicated to his influence on traders and craftsmen.

== See also ==
- Tasawwuf

== Sources ==
- Öztürk, Özhan (2005). Karadeniz : ansiklopedik sözlük (1. basım ed.). İstanbul: Heyamola Yayınları. ISBN 975-6121-00-9. OCLC 63737636.
- "Alevi Önderleri (Horasan Piri Hünkar Hacı Bektaş Veli) |". 26 April 2017. Archived from the original on 26 April 2017.
- "Haci Bektas Veli and Bektashi Order | All About Turkey". www.allaboutturkey.com.
- "Traditional Institutions - Dervish Orders". www.ktb.gov.tr.
