= Tomb of Ahi Evren =

Tomb in Turkey

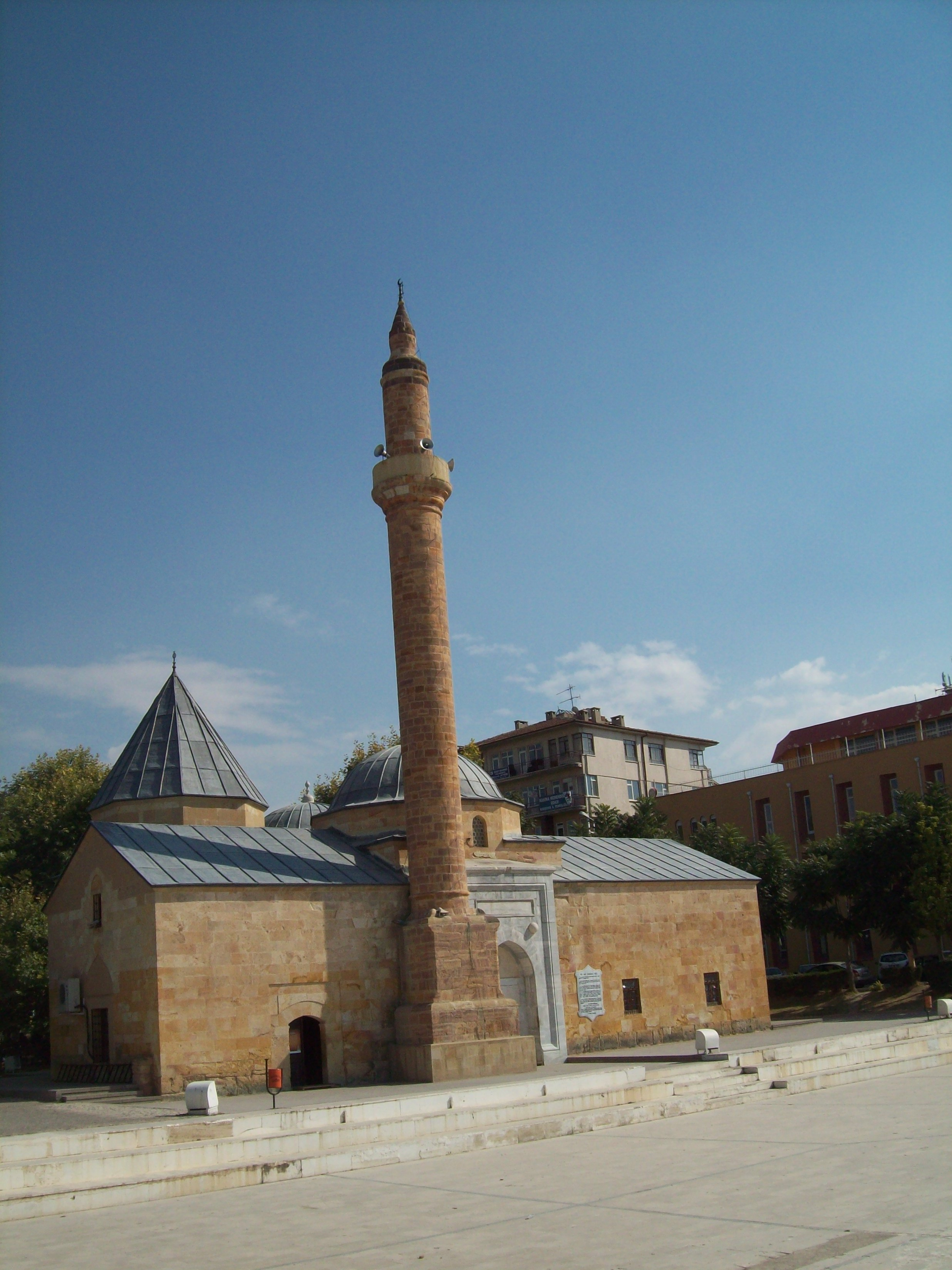
Tomb of Ahi Evren

The tomb of Ahi Evren (Turkish: Ahi Evran Türbesi) is a part of mosque-tomb complex in Kırşehir, Turkey.

== Geography ==
The complex is in the center of Kırşehir at 39°08′53″N 34°09′33″E . The complex also houses the branch office of the Ministry of Culture.

== History ==
Ahi Evren, a leader of the Ahi Brotherhood and Muslim preacher in Anatolia in the 13th century was a leather dealer when he organized Muslim craftsmen in to a guild. His system worked well up to the 19th century and he is still considered as an honorary leader of the craftsmen. He was killed in 1261 by the Mongols.

His tomb was built much later by Hasan Bey, an Ahi craftsman in 1450. In 1481 Bozkurt of Dulkadir a bey of Dulkadir Beylik which briefly captured Kırşehir, renewed and enlarged the complex by adding a zaviye (Islamic hermintage). (Both Hasan Bey and Bozkurt of Dulkadir had inscriptions in the complex) The exact place of his grave was predicted only by the location of other Ahi graves. The room was decorated in the 19th century.

== The tomb ==
The tomb is composed of an iwan and two chambers. The symbolic coffin of Ahi Evren is in the north chamber. In this chamber there was another adorned coffin of a sheikh named Erzurimi. But now this coffin has been transferred to Ankara for protection. The south chamber has been restored recently. This part is designed as a showroom. In the iwan there are 5 simple coffins of nameless persons.

== World Heritage Status ==
This site was added to the UNESCO World Heritage Tentative List on April 15, 2014, in the Cultural category.
