= 1430s in architecture =

List of years in architecture	(table)
- … 1420; 1421; 1422; 1423; 1424; 1425; 1426; 1427; 1428; 1429; 1430; 1431; 1432; 1433; 1434; 1435; 1436; 1437; 1438; 1439; 1440 …
- Buildings and structures: Art; Archaeology; Architecture; Literature; Music; Philosophy; Science; +...

- 1420s
- 1430s in architecture
- 1440s
Other topics in 1430s:
- Art

== Buildings and structures ==
=== Buildings ===
Brunelleschi's dome for Florence Cathedral

- Tangermünde Rathaus built.
- 1431 – Collegiate Church of St Peter & St Paul, Lingfield, Surrey, England, rebuilt.
- c. 1435 – Hoshang Shah tomb, Mandav, construction begins.
- 1436: August 30 – Brunelleschi's Dome at Florence Cathedral dedicated.
- 1439 – Strasbourg Cathedral completed.

== Births ==
- c. 1430 – Luca Fancelli born in Settignano, near Florence (died c. 1494)
- c. 1433 – Fra Giovanni Giocondo born in Verona (d. 1515)
- 1439 – Francesco di Giorgio born in Siena (died 1502)

== Deaths ==
- c. 1439 – Richard Winchcombe, English master mason
