= Kırşehir =

- Municipality
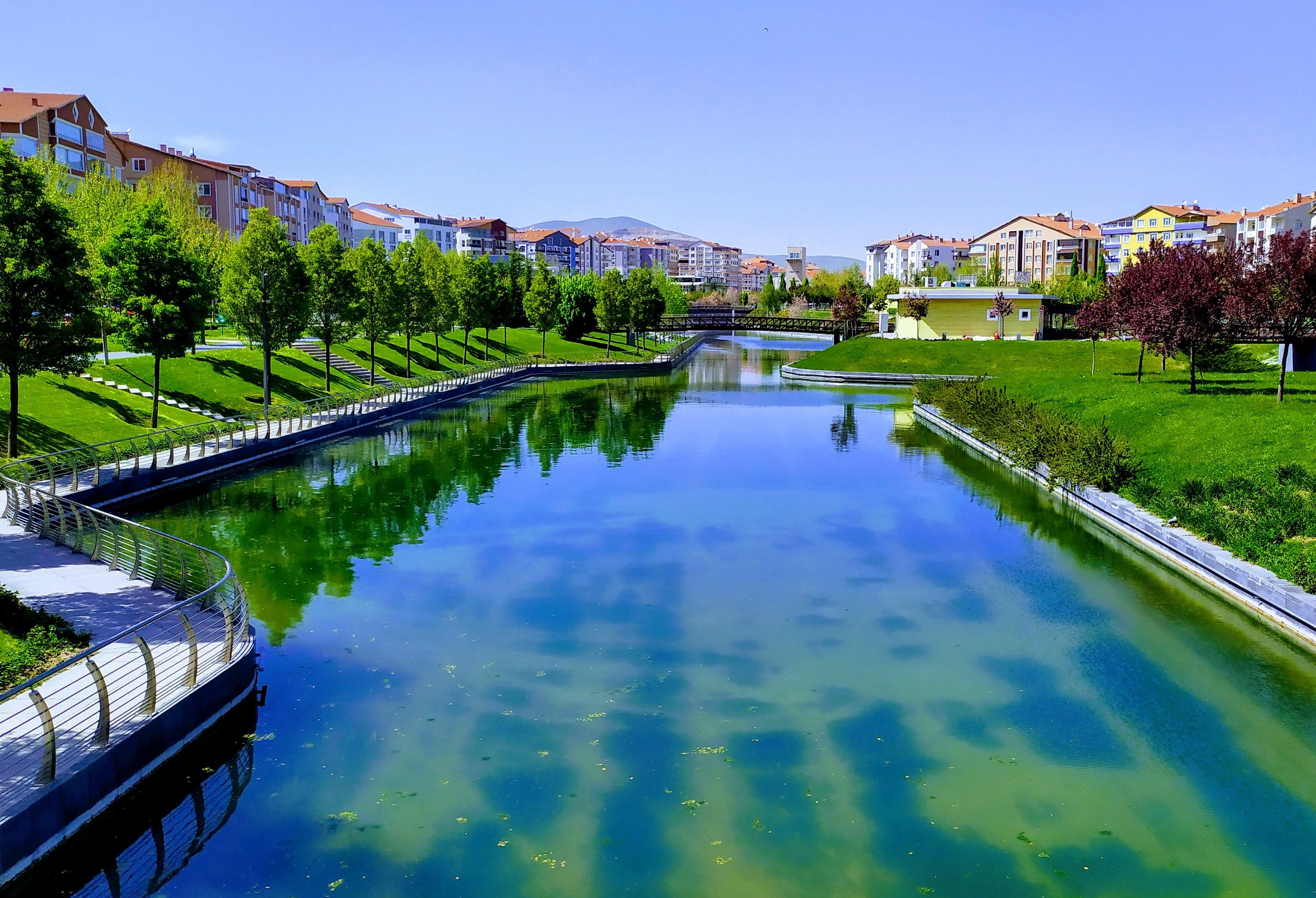
- Kentpark in Kırşehir

- Location within Turkey Location within Turkey Central Anatolia
- Coordinates: 39°08′44″N 34°09′39″E
- Country: Turkey
- Province: Kırşehir
- District: Kırşehir

Government
  - Mayor: Selahattin Ekicioğlu (CHP)
- Elevation: 1,027 m (3,369 ft)
- Population (2022): 150,700
- Time zone: UTC+3 (TRT)
- Postal code: 40000
- Area code: 0386
- Website: www.kirsehir.bel.tr

Kırşehir is a city in Turkey. It is the seat of Kırşehir Province and Kırşehir District. Its population is 162,989 (2023).

== History ==
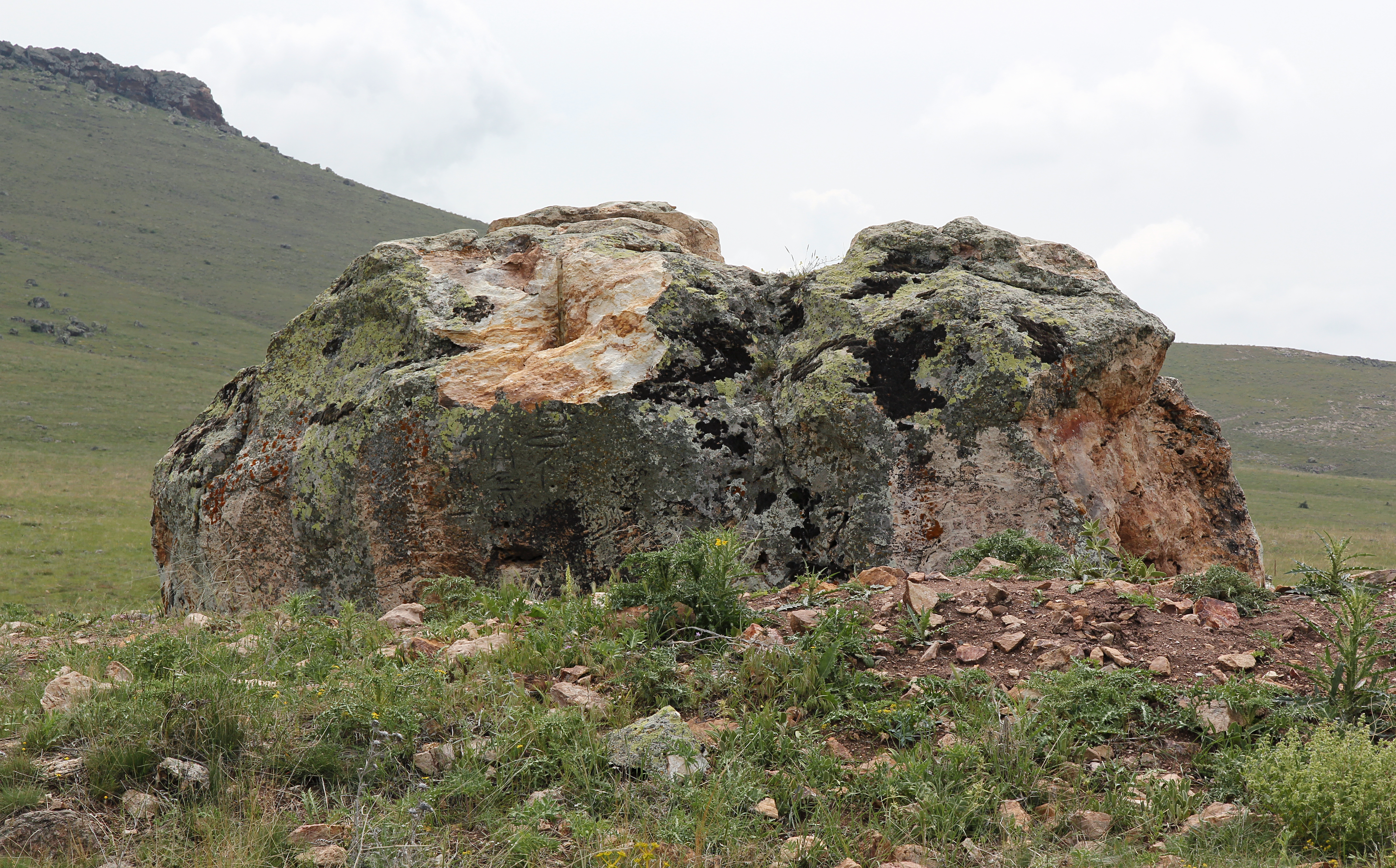
Malkaya is a monument with rock inscriptions that belongs to Hittites civilization.

The history of Kırşehir dates back to the Hittites. During the period of the Hittites, the basin of Kırşehir was known as the country of "Ahiyuva", meaning "the Land of the Achaeans", as the Greeks were known to the Hittites. This basin also took the name Cappadocia at the time of the Romans and Byzantines.

Kırşehir was once known as Aquae Saravenae. The Seljuks took the city in the 1070s and bestowed the current name. In Turkish, "Kır Şehri" means "steppe city" or "prairie city". It became the chief town of a sanjak in the Ottoman vilayet of Angora, which possessed, c. 1912, 8,000 inhabitants, most of them Muslim Turks.

In the 19th century, Kırşehir was attached to the sanjak of Ankara. From 1867 until 1922, Kırşehir was part of Angora vilayet. In 1924, Kırşehir was made capital of the new Kırşehir Province. Mustafa Kemal Atatürk visited the city in 1921 and 1931.

== Historic buildings and structures ==
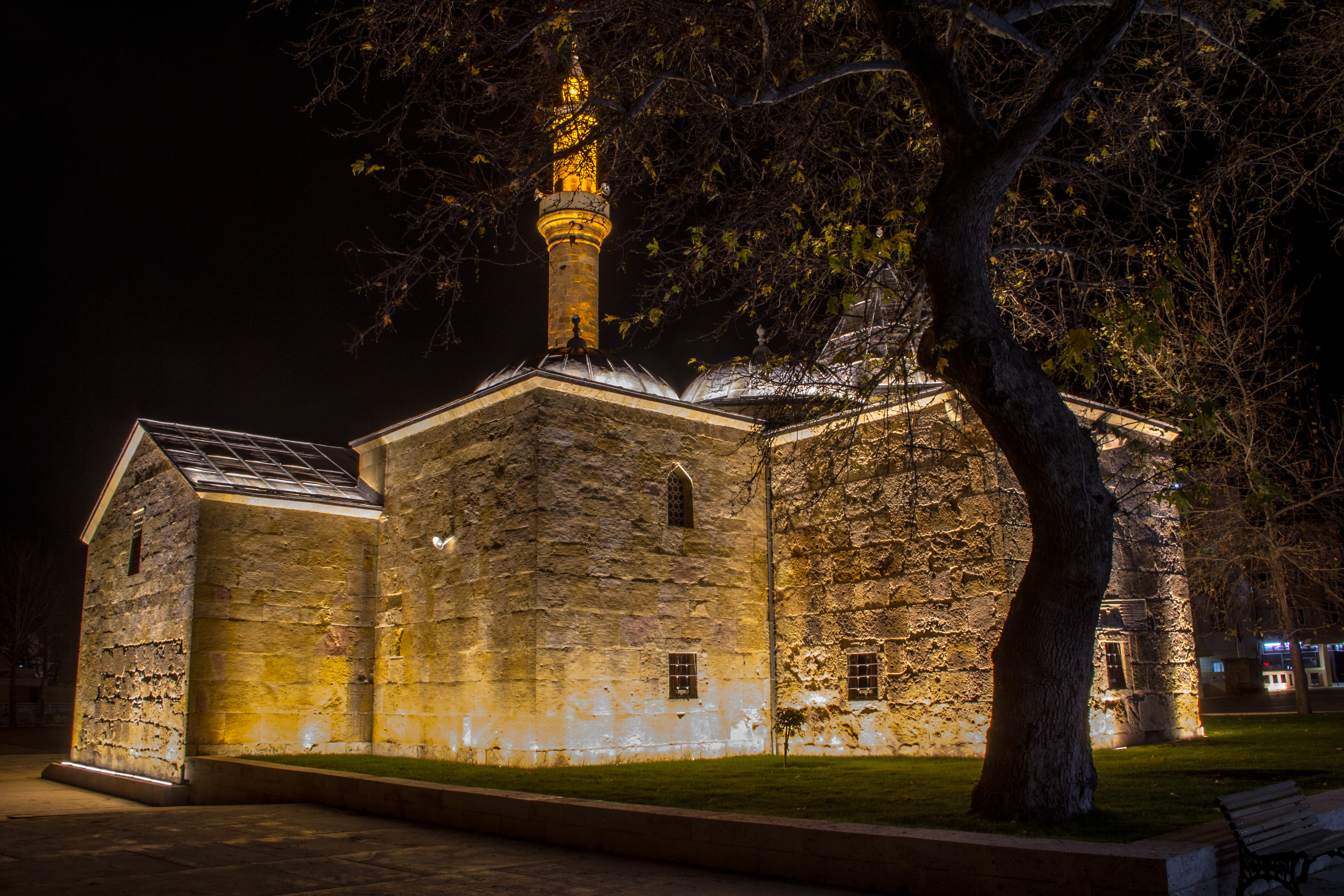
Ahi Evran Mosque

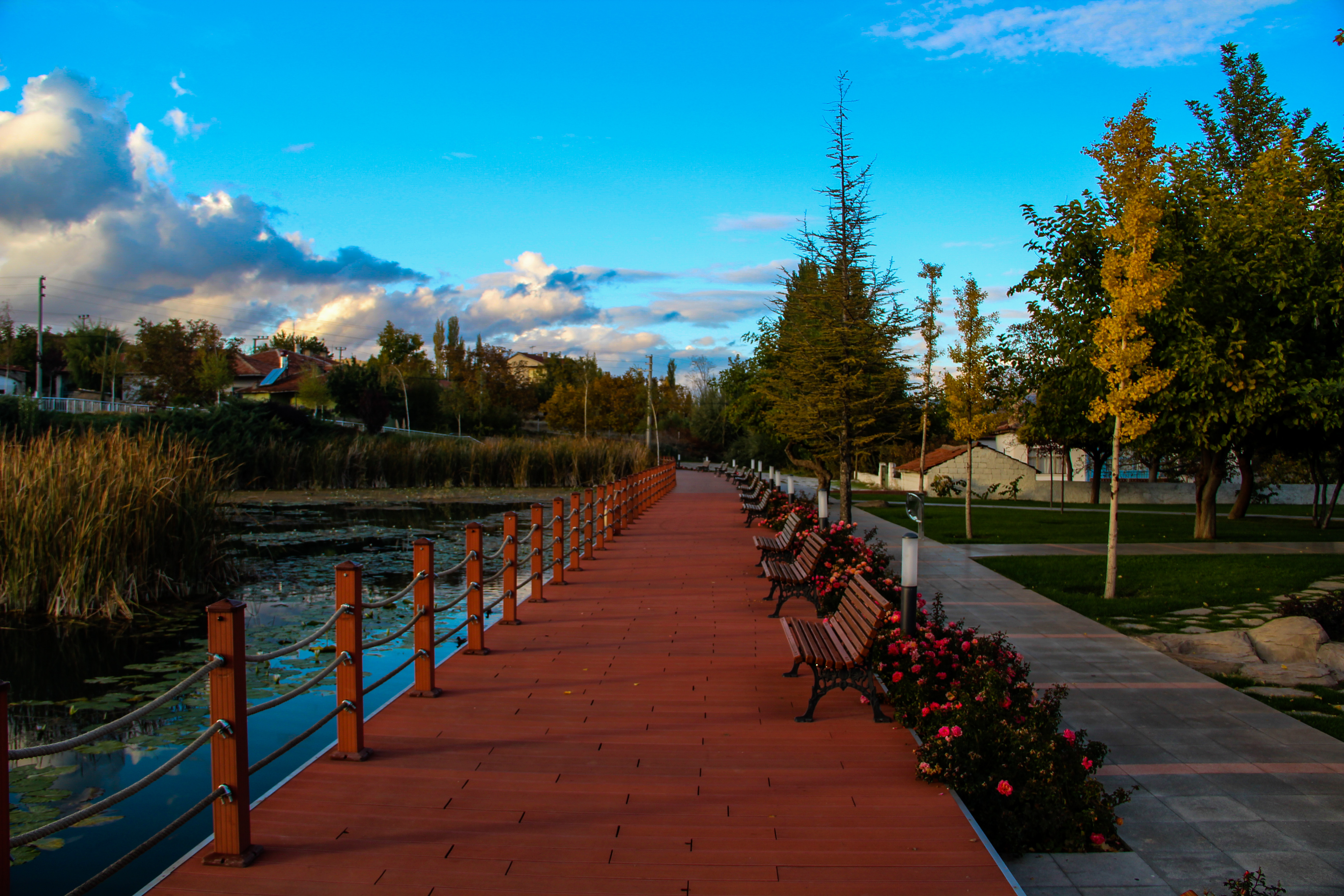
View of Lake Hilla

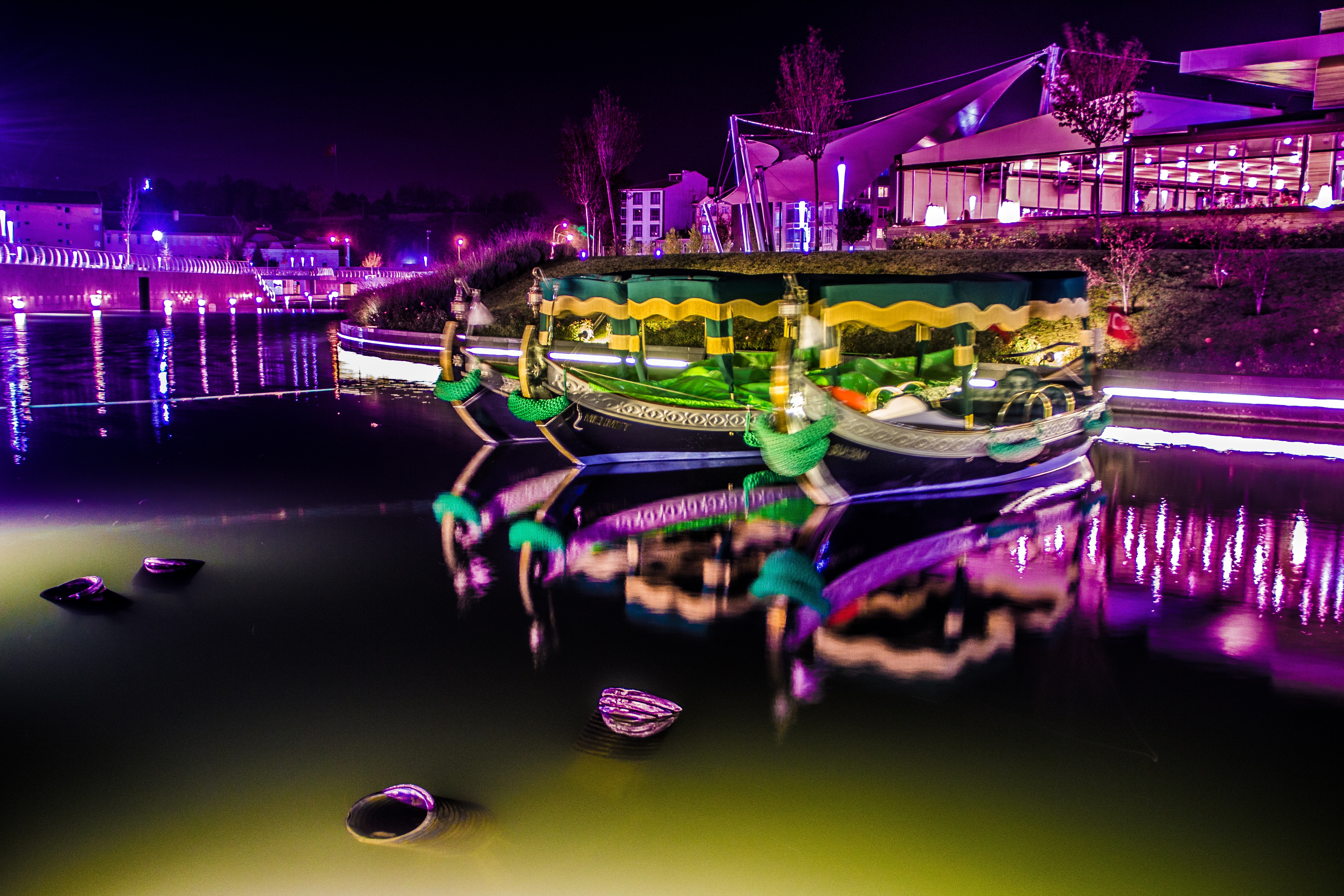
Gondolas in Kentpark

=== Kesikköprü ===
Kesikköprü is one of the bridges built by the Seljuk Empire in Central Anatolia. It is on the way of Kırşehir-Konya, about 20 km (12.43 mi) to the south of Kırşehir, and across the River Kızılırmak with its 13 parts. Those who came from Izmir and tried to reach Sivas and Erzurum from Tokat passed over Kesikköprü. In the 17th and 18th centuries, the bridge took the name of Kesikköprü due to the fact that caravan roads were cut off by highwaymen.

There is an old Seljuk mosque built during the reign of either Mesud I or Kilij Arslan II. In the countryside is a ruined türbe (tomb) of a possible dervish during the times of either Seljuks or Ottomans.

The inscription on the bridge says it was built by Atabeg Izzu’d-Din Muhammed in 646 of the Hijrah/1248 of the Christian era during the rule of Keykavus, the son of Keyhüsrev. The inscription sunk in the river in 1953. The three-line inscription on the stone base can be read with difficulty:

Ressame bi-imaret hazihi el-kantara el-mubareke (fi eyyam khan) dawlet es-sultan el-azam, izzu-d dunya wa-d din, ebu'l feth Kaykaus bin Kaykhusraw Burhan emir el-mu’munin. El-mawla el-sahibu el-azam, atabek el-muazzam, nazım mesalih el-'alem, nasır el-enam, zubdet el-eyyam, Izz-eddin ebu'l meli Muhammed Zahir Ali Seljuk wa emir el-mu’minin a'azzellahu nasrahu wa a'la kadrehu fi shuhuri sene sitte wa arba'in wa sitte mia [646], hamiden li-Llah wa musallian 'ala nebiyyihi Muhammed wa aalihi wa sellem teslimen kethiran.

=== Ashik Pasha Mausoleum ===
Aşık Pasha Mausoleum is the tomb of the 14-century Sufi poet Aşık Pasha who died in 1332.

=== Kırşehir Castle ===
Kırşehir Castle is located on a hill mound, believed to have been built in the 4th century. It covers an area of 10 acres. It is thought to have been built by the Byzantine Emperor Justinian. Nothing remains from the castle.

== Geographical center of the world ==
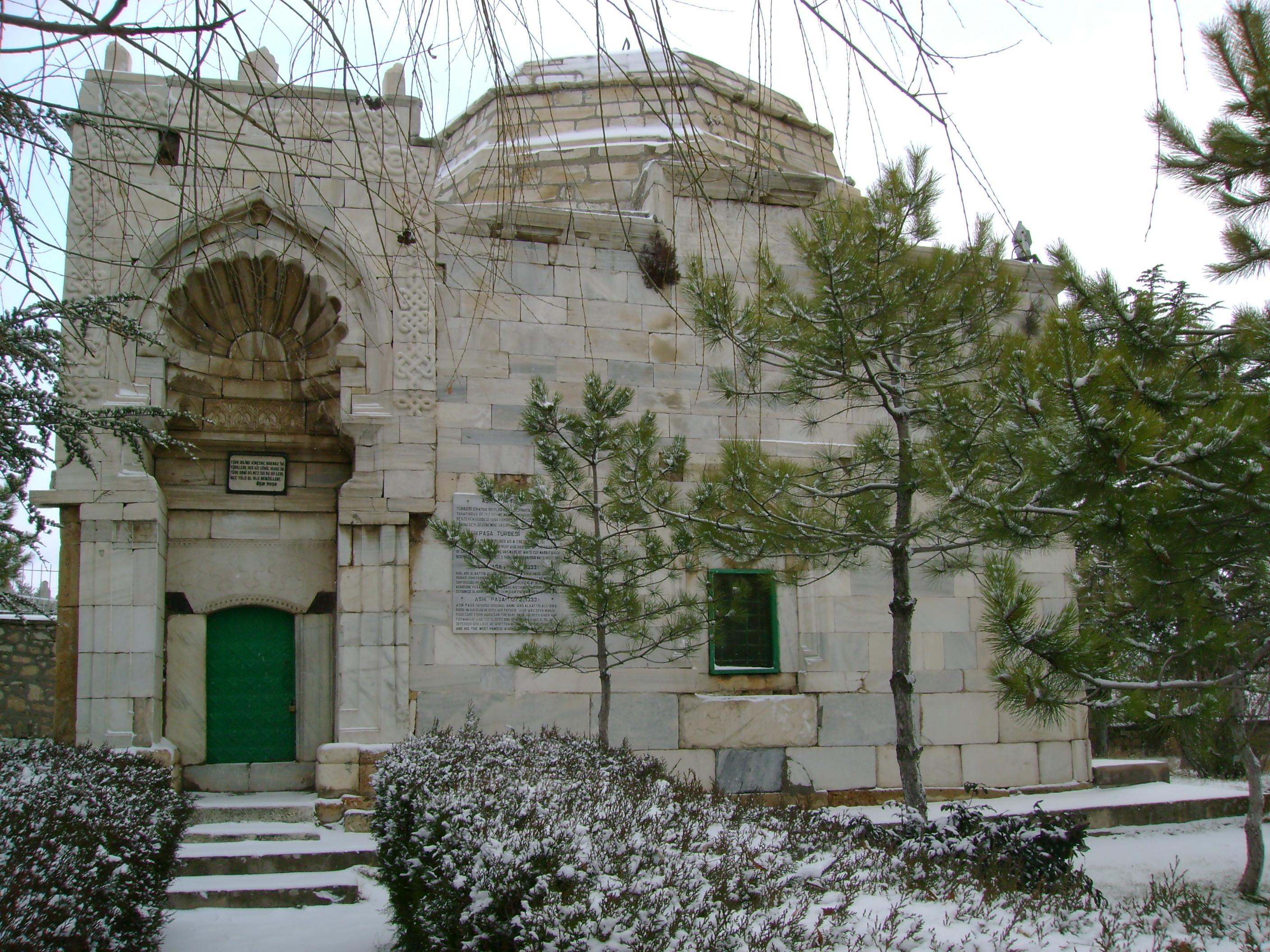
Tomb of Ashik Pasha

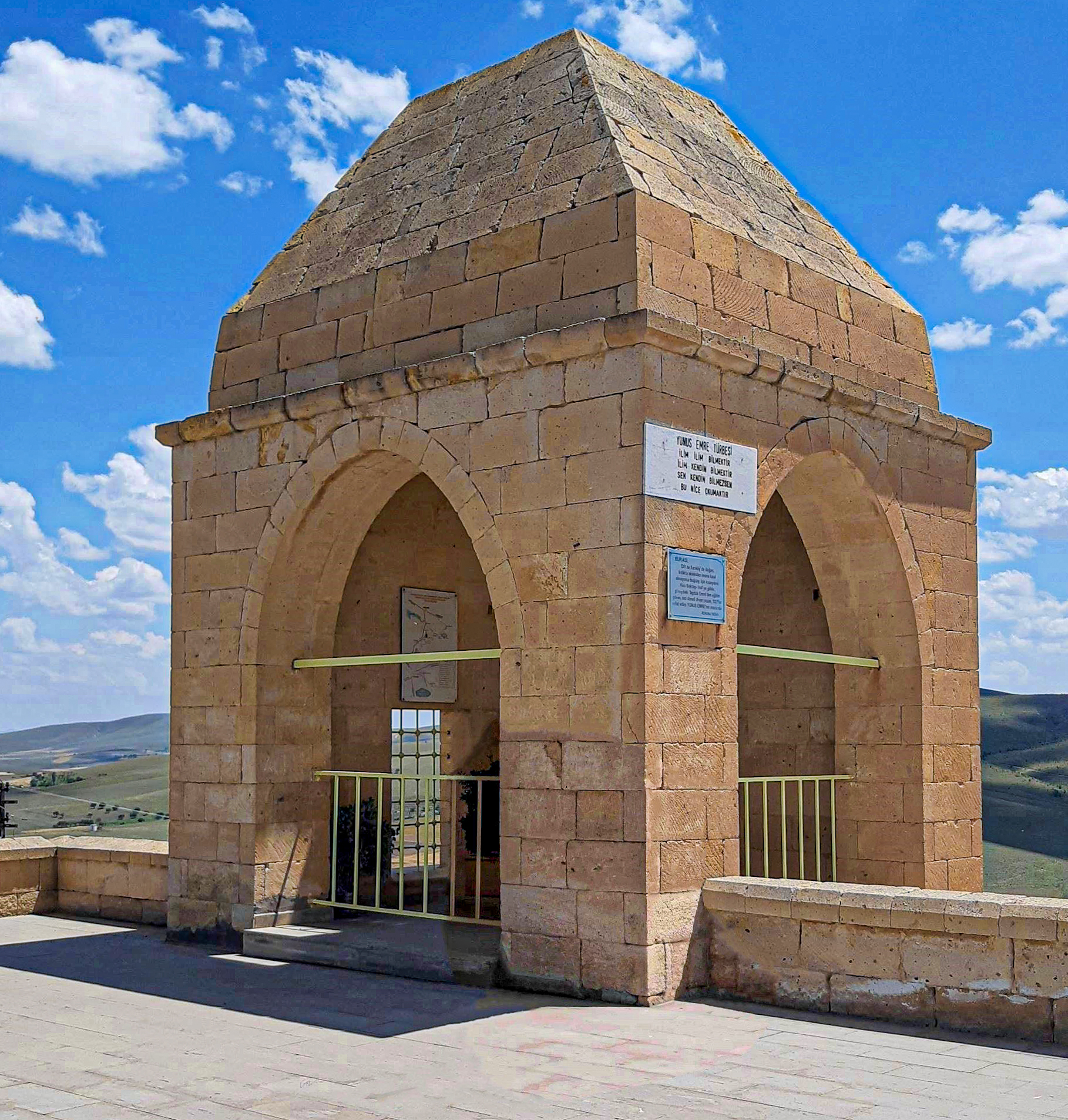
Yunus Emre Tomb in Ulupınar.

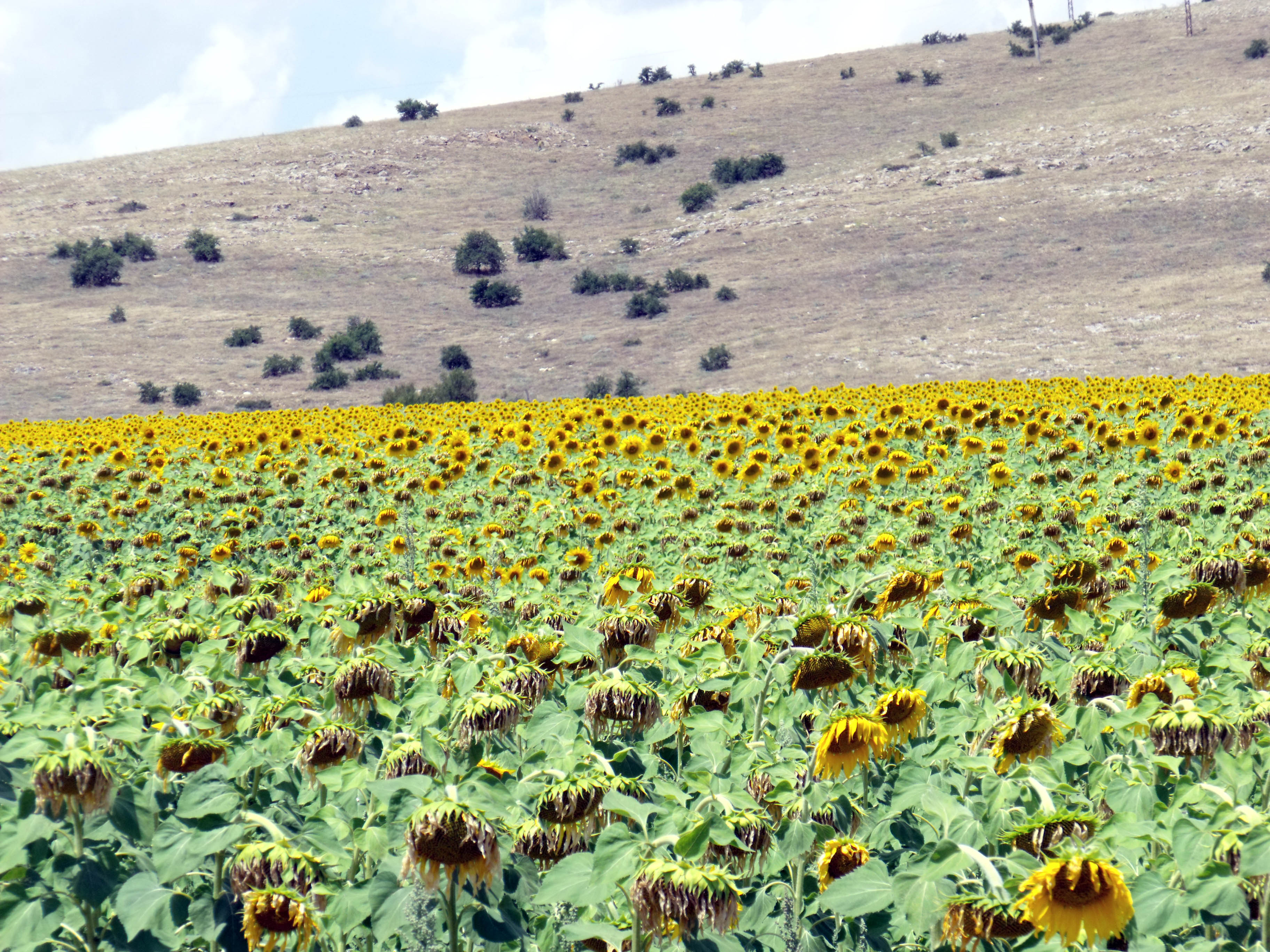
Sunflower cultivation is an important part of the agriculture in Kırşehir

The village of Seyfe within Kırşehir district is considered the geographical center of Earth, as it lies at the intersection of the 39th parallel north and the 34th meridian east.

== Ecclesiastical history ==
=== Metropolitan Archbishopric of Mocissus ===
Mocissus was also a Christian bishopric, and became a metropolitan see when, as Procopius (De ædif., V, iv) informs us, Justinian divided Cappadocia into three provinces and made this fortified site in north-western Cappadocia metropolis of Cappadocia Tertia, giving it the name of Justinianopolis. Nothing else is known of its history, and its name should perhaps be written Mocessus. There is no doubt that the site of Mocissus, or Mocessus, is that which is occupied by the modern city of Kırşehir. The metropolitanate was temporarily assumed by the Diocese of Caesarea in 1327, following its decline by the Anatolian Beyliks. In 1369 and in 1370 however, new metropolitans assumed Mocissus.

Only a few of its bishops are known: the earliest, Peter, attended the Fifth Ecumenical Council (Second Council of Constantinople, 536); the last, whose name is not known, was a Catholic, and was consecrated after the mid-15th century Catholic Council of Florence by Patriarch Metrophanes II of Constantinople.

=== Titular see ===
The diocese was restored in 1895 as a titular archbishopric of the highest (Metropolitan) rank. It's vacant, having had the following incumbents:

- John Joseph Frederick Otto Zardetti (1895.05.25 – 1902.05.09)
- Giacomo Merizzi (1902.08.21 – 1916.03.22)
- Giovanni Battista Vinati (1916.07.31 – 1917.01.09)
- Adolf Fritzen (1919.07.31 – 1919.09.07)
- Lorenzo Schioppa (1920.08.20 – 1935.04.23)
- John Hugh MacDonald (1936.12.16 – 1938.03.05)
- Nicolas Cadi (1939.11.16 – 1941)
- Roger-Henri-Marie Beaussart (1943.12.10 – 1952.02.29)
- Vigilio Federico Dalla Zuanna, O.F.M. Cap. (1952.11.24 – 1956.03.04)
- Giovanni Jacono (1956.10.02 – 1957.05.26)
- Heinrich Wienken (1957.08.19 – 1961.01.21)
- Gabrijel Bukatko (1961.03.02 – 1964.03.24)

== Climate ==
Kırşehir has a Mediterranean (Köppen climate classification: Csa) or continental climate (Trewartha climate classification: Dc), with cold, snowy winters and hot, dry summers. Light rainfall occurs year-round, except for late summer when rain is virtually absent.

Highest recorded temperature:40.5 °C (104.9 °F) on 14 August 2019
Lowest recorded temperature:−28.0 °C (−18.4 °F) on 6 January 1942

Climate data for Kırşehir (1991–2020, extremes 1930–2023)
Month	Jan	Feb	Mar	Apr	May	Jun	Jul	Aug	Sep	Oct	Nov	Dec	Year
Record high °C (°F)	19.0 (66.2)	20.6 (69.1)	28.0 (82.4)	30.9 (87.6)	34.5 (94.1)	36.2 (97.2)	40.2 (104.4)	40.5 (104.9)	39.0 (102.2)	33.6 (92.5)	26.2 (79.2)	19.9 (67.8)	40.5 (104.9)
Mean daily maximum °C (°F)	4.9 (40.8)	7.2 (45.0)	12.2 (54.0)	17.5 (63.5)	22.5 (72.5)	26.9 (80.4)	30.7 (87.3)	30.9 (87.6)	26.7 (80.1)	20.6 (69.1)	13.0 (55.4)	6.9 (44.4)	18.3 (64.9)
Daily mean °C (°F)	0.1 (32.2)	1.5 (34.7)	5.9 (42.6)	10.8 (51.4)	15.7 (60.3)	20.0 (68.0)	23.7 (74.7)	23.9 (75.0)	19.2 (66.6)	13.5 (56.3)	6.5 (43.7)	2.1 (35.8)	11.9 (53.4)
Mean daily minimum °C (°F)	−3.8 (25.2)	−3.0 (26.6)	0.5 (32.9)	4.7 (40.5)	9.2 (48.6)	13.2 (55.8)	16.5 (61.7)	16.8 (62.2)	12.1 (53.8)	7.2 (45.0)	1.2 (34.2)	−1.7 (28.9)	6.1 (43.0)
Record low °C (°F)	−28.0 (−18.4)	−25.3 (−13.5)	−21.8 (−7.2)	−8.2 (17.2)	−1.4 (29.5)	2.6 (36.7)	5.1 (41.2)	5.0 (41.0)	−1.2 (29.8)	−6.6 (20.1)	−21.5 (−6.7)	−24.3 (−11.7)	−28.0 (−18.4)
Average precipitation mm (inches)	43.8 (1.72)	31.2 (1.23)	37.9 (1.49)	42.7 (1.68)	46.2 (1.82)	37.5 (1.48)	8.9 (0.35)	11.8 (0.46)	14.9 (0.59)	30.6 (1.20)	35.0 (1.38)	44.9 (1.77)	385.4 (15.17)
Average precipitation days	12.3	10.53	11.13	10.97	12.37	8.03	2.2	1.83	3.77	7.1	8.27	12.7	101.2
Average snowy days	8.4	6	4.4	0.7	0	0	0	0	0	0.1	1.1	4.3	25
Average relative humidity (%)	79	73.8	66.7	62.7	60.6	54.9	46.9	46.6	50.5	61.2	71.1	79.2	62.8
Mean monthly sunshine hours	102.3	130.0	176.7	210.0	272.8	318.0	368.9	347.2	288.0	223.2	165.0	102.3	2,704.4
Mean daily sunshine hours	3.3	4.6	5.7	7.0	8.8	10.6	11.9	11.2	9.6	7.2	5.5	3.3	7.4
Source 1: Turkish State Meteorological Service
Source 2: NCEI(humidity)

== Notable people ==
- Uğur Mumcu, investigative journalist
- Neşet Ertaş, Folk singer
- Lütfi Müfit Özdeş, politician
- Şemsi Yastıman, folk musician
- Nur al-Din ibn Jaja, Emir of Kırşehir from 1261 to 1277
- Asik Pasa, Ṣūfī spiritual leader, Turkish poet

== Gallery ==
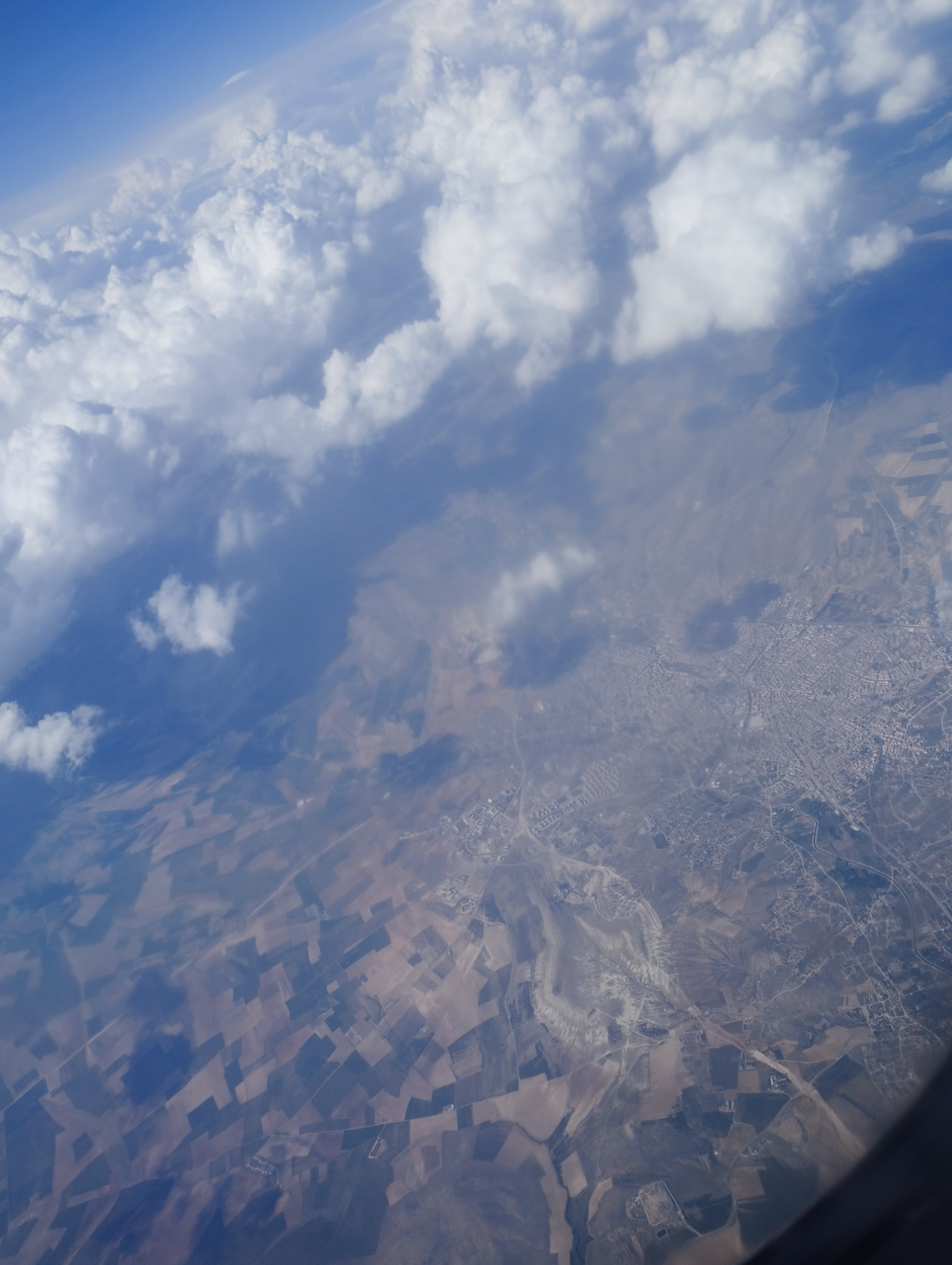
View of Kırşehir from an airplane

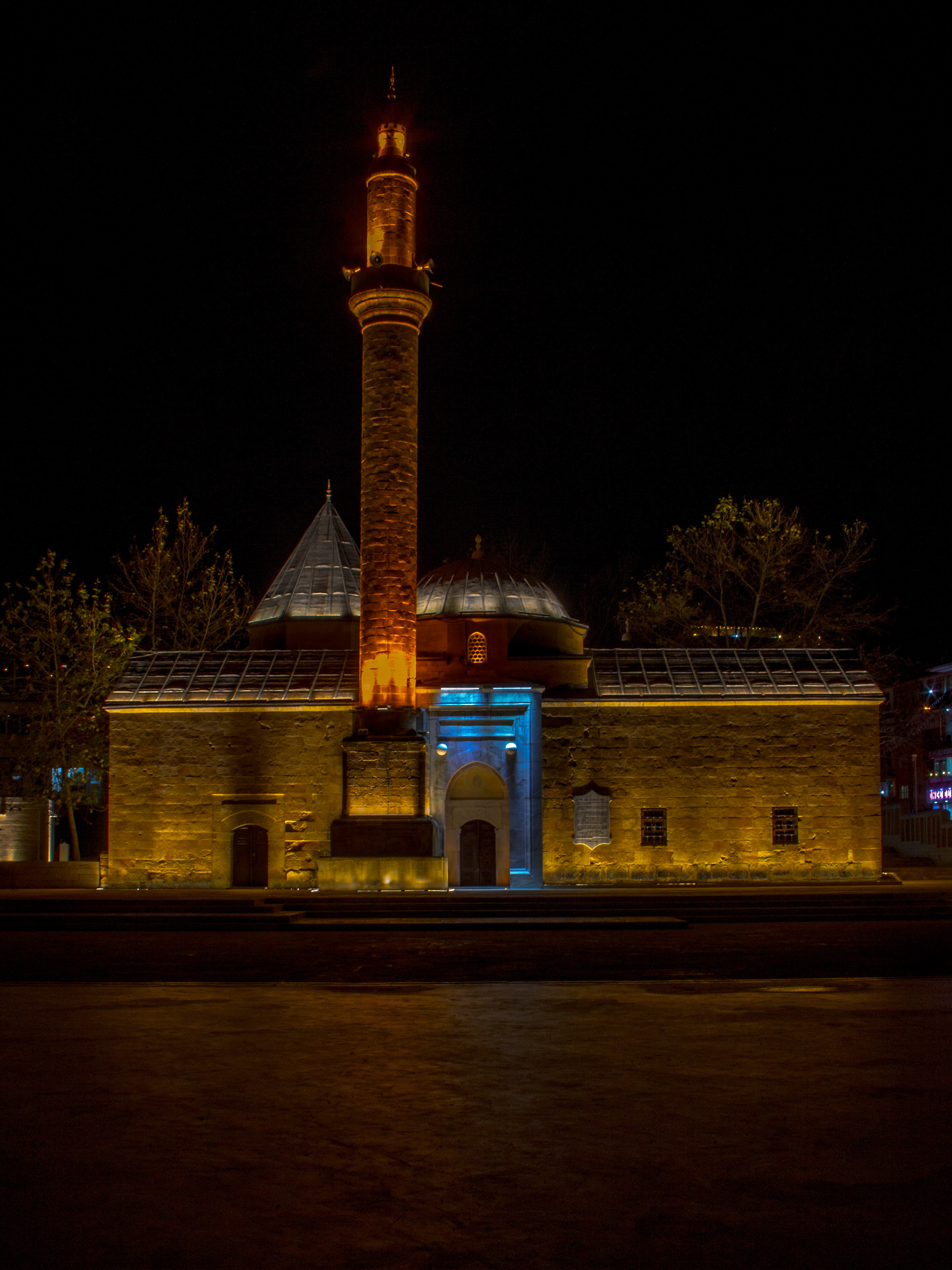
Ahi Evran Tomb front view

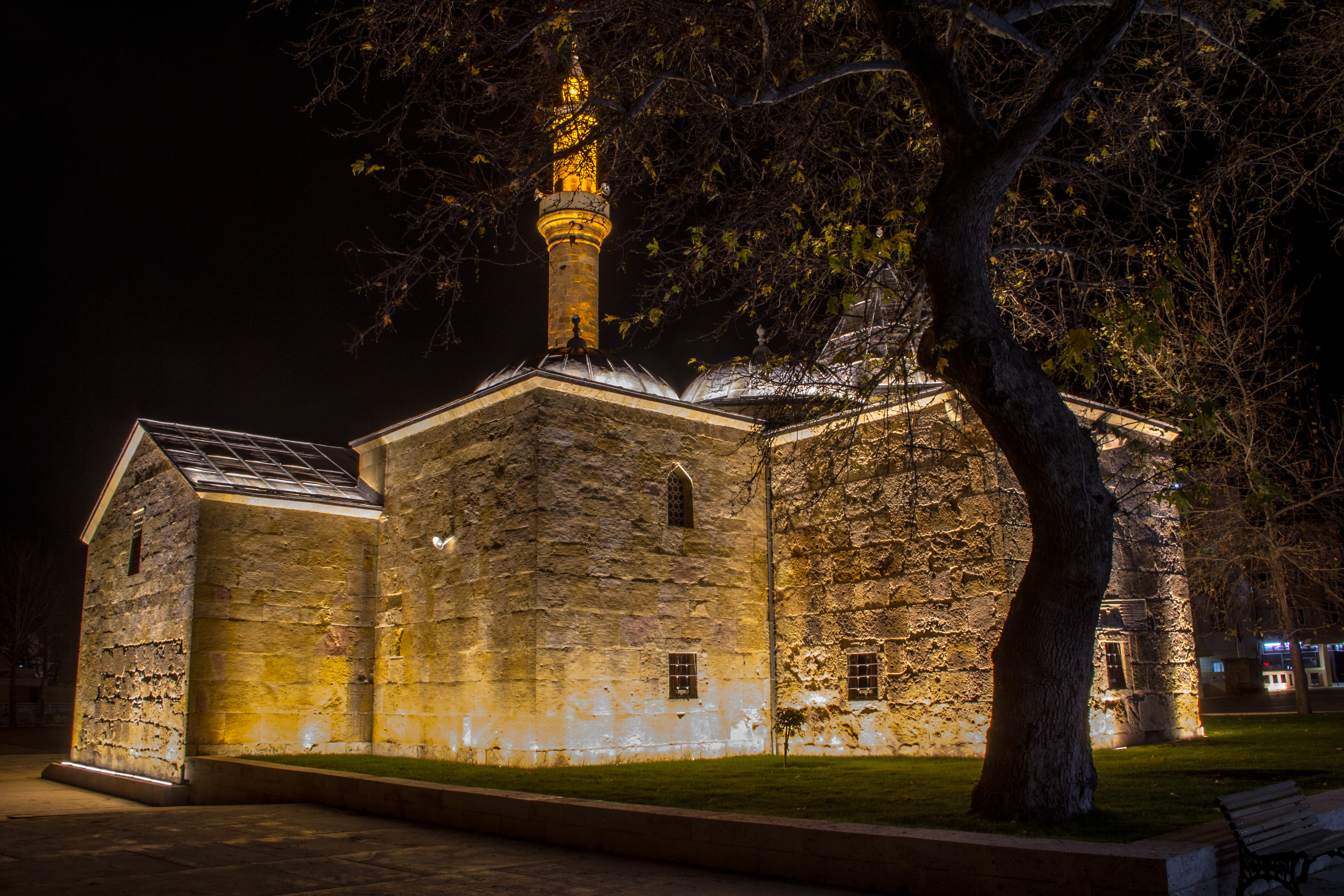
Ahi Evran Tomb side view

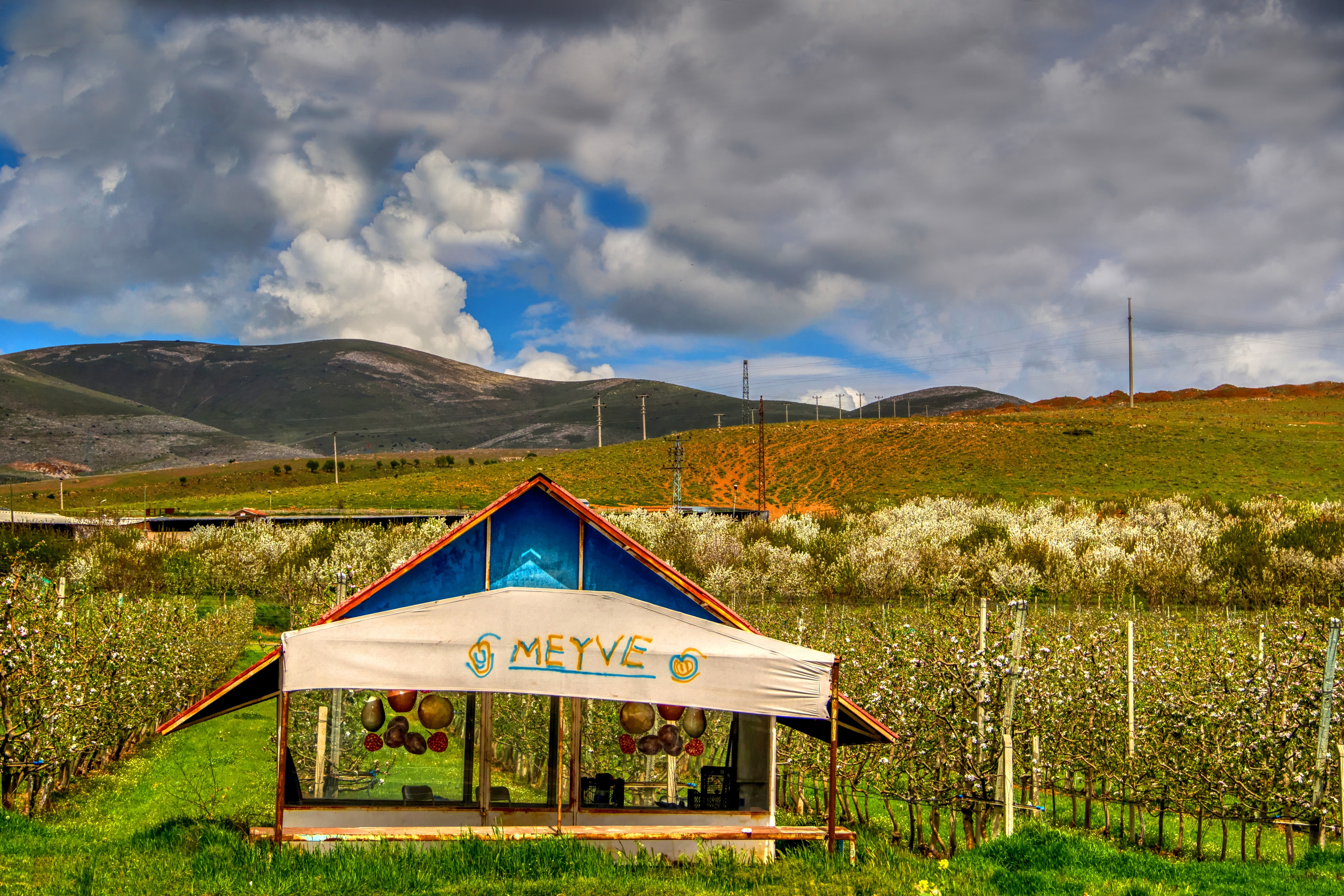
Apple farm in Kırşehir

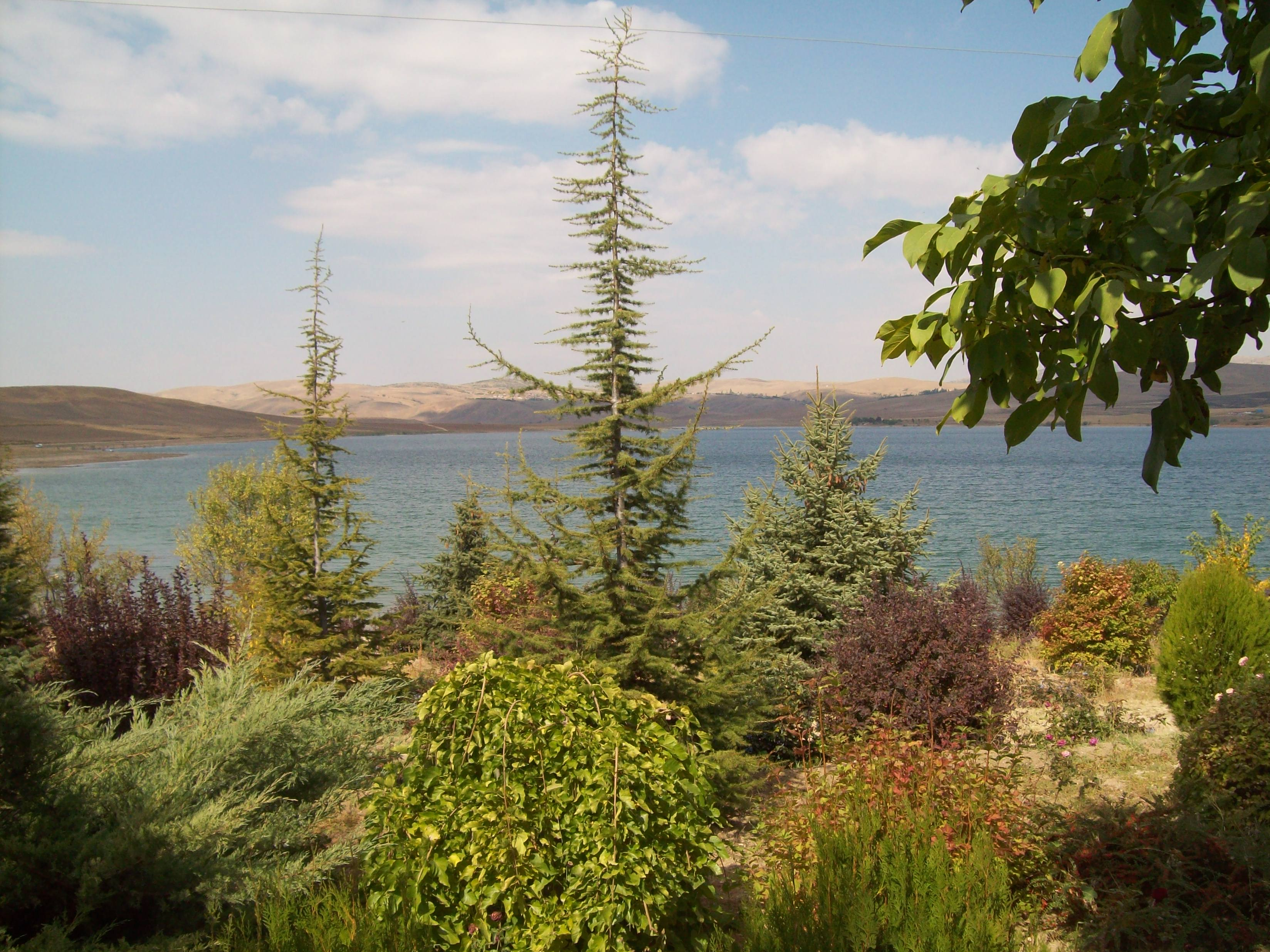
Cügün (Cogun) lake

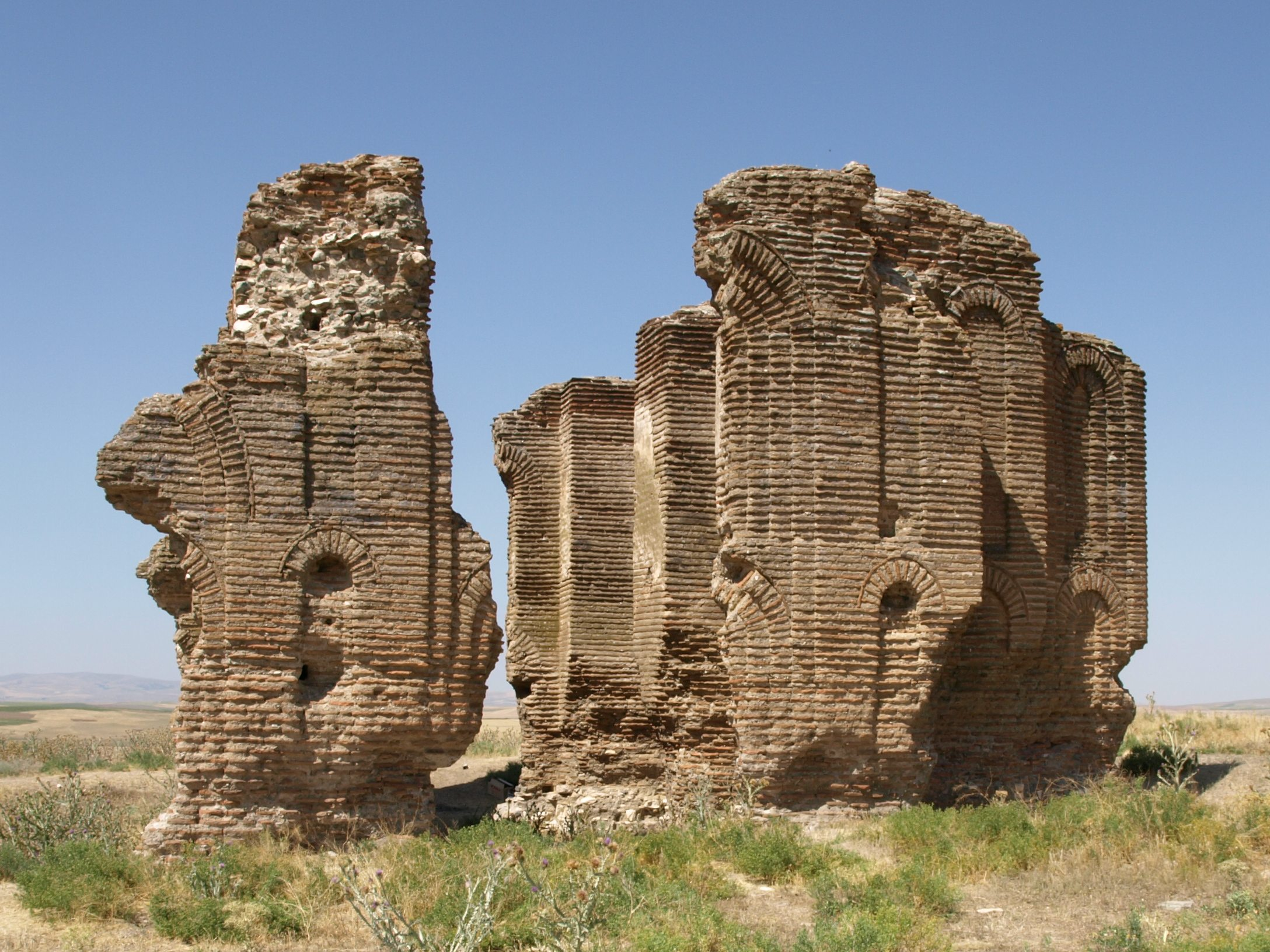
The ruins of the Üçayak Byzantine Church

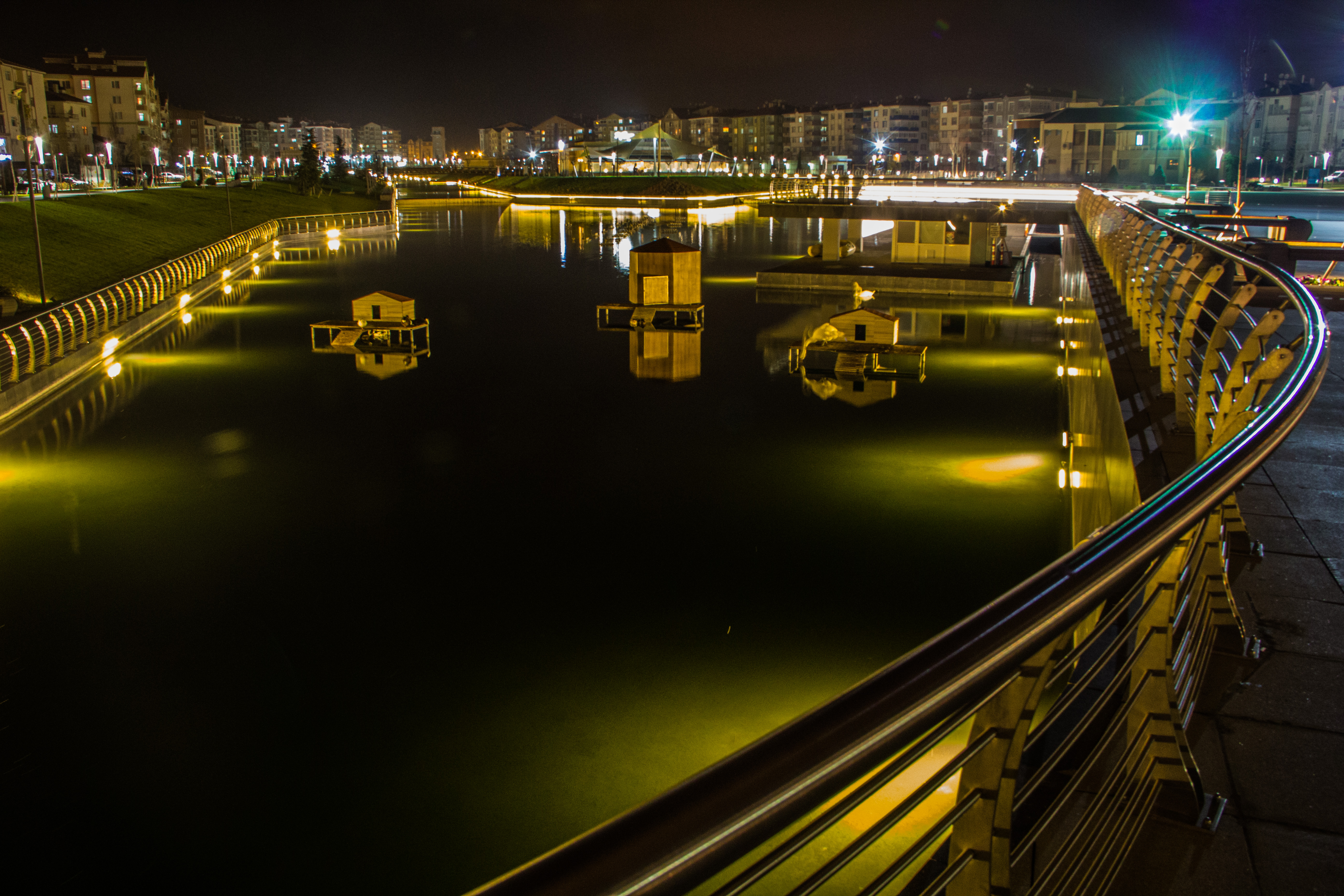
View of Kent Park at night

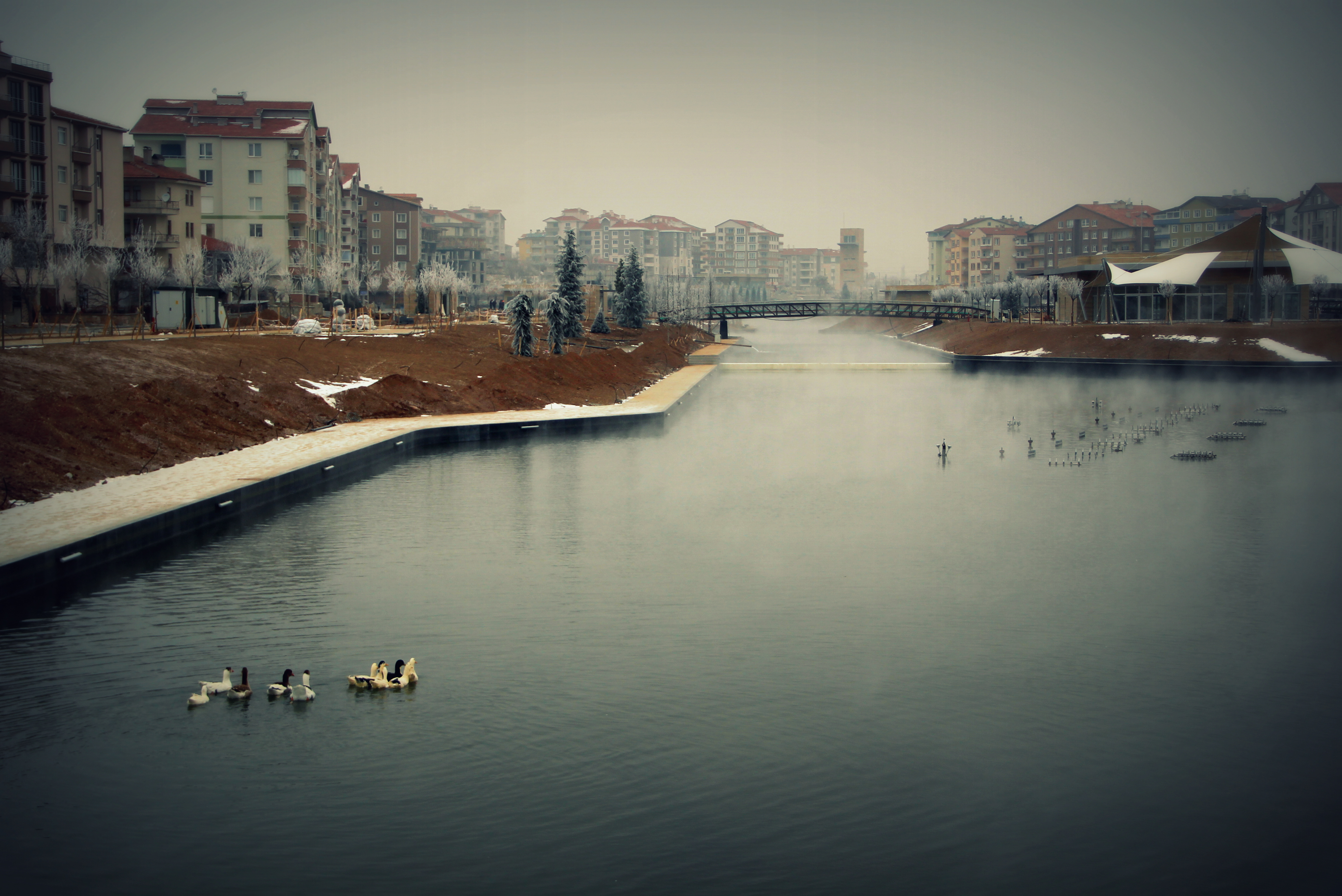
View of the city during the day

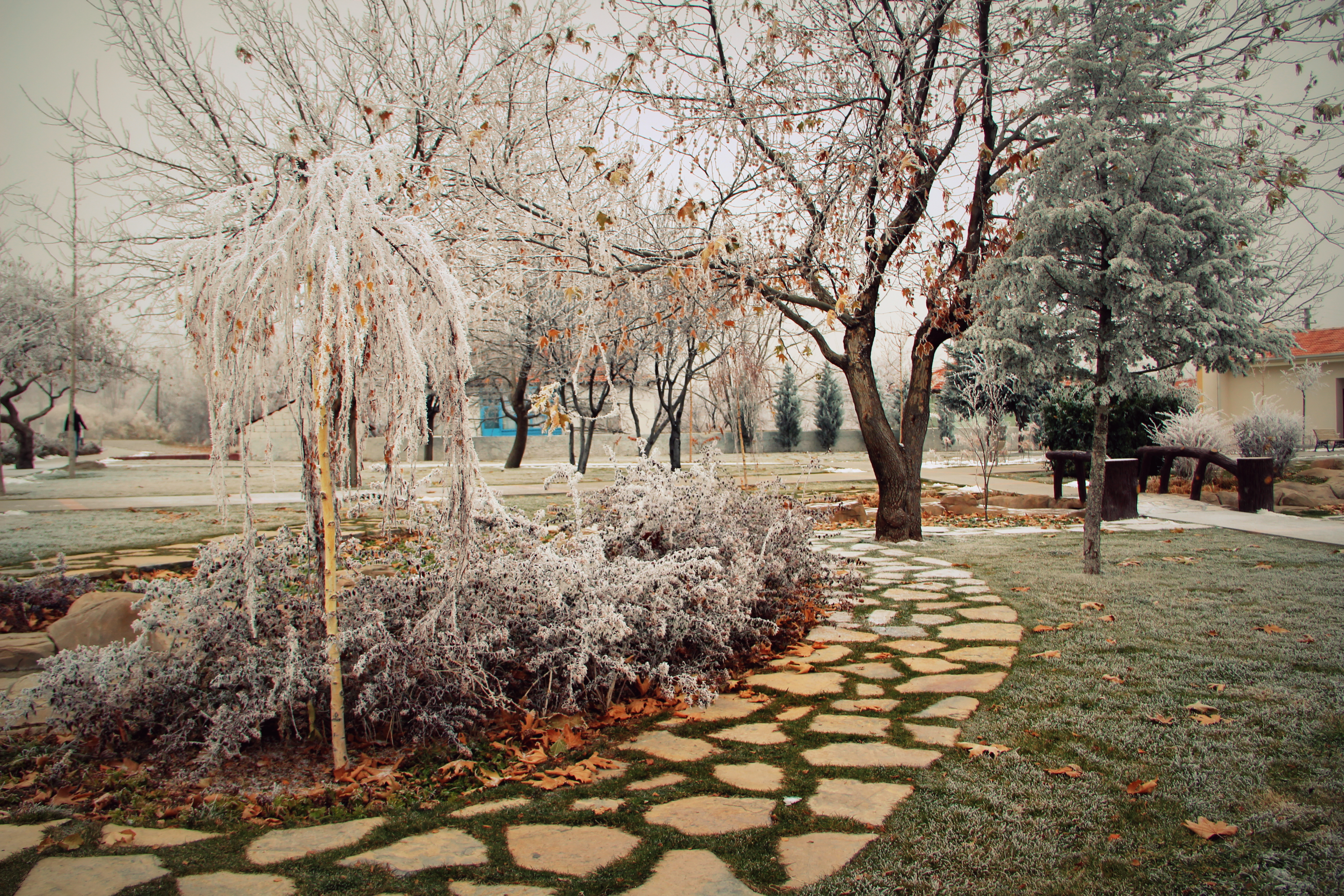
Winter in Hilla Park

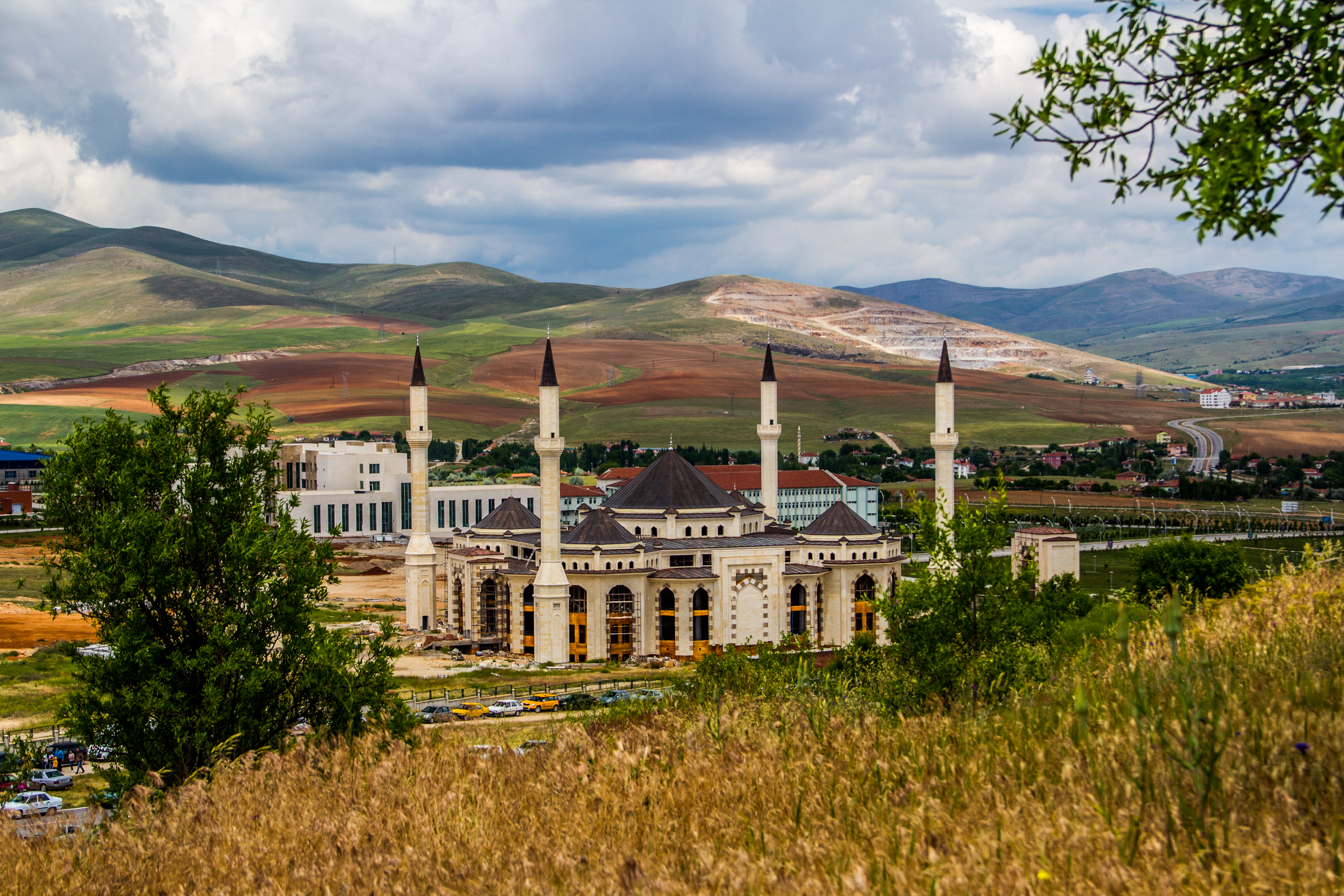
Construction of the new mosque in Özbağ in Kırşehir, Turkey
