= Kesikköprü Dam =

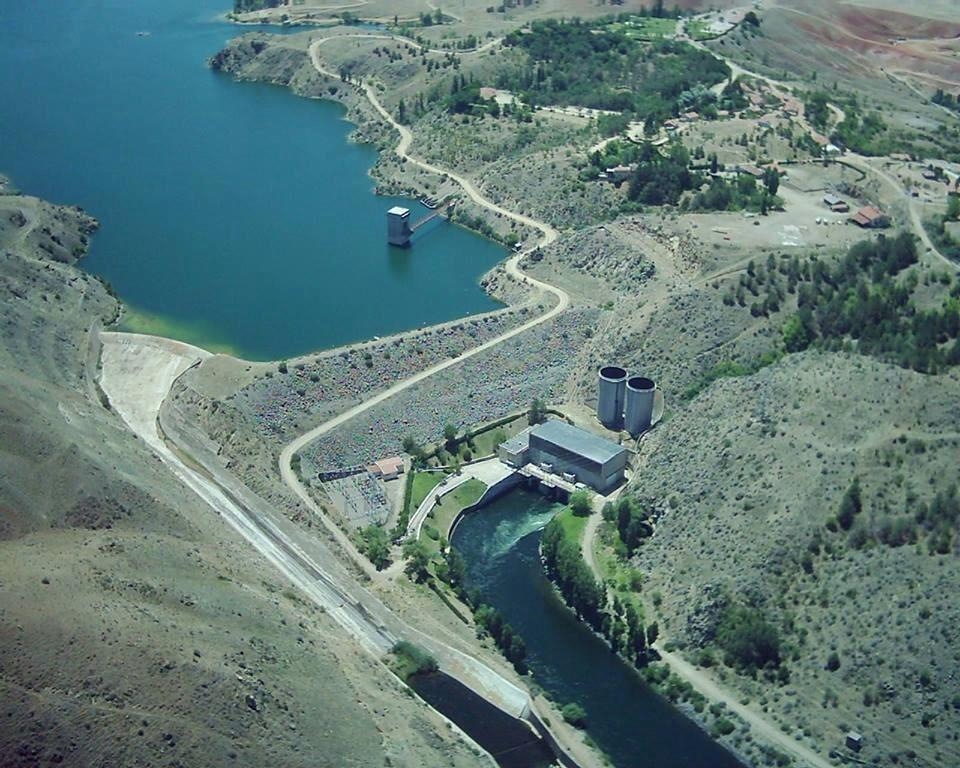
- Location: Near Ankara, Turkey
- Coordinates: 39.3953°N 33.421°E

Dam and spillways
- Impounds: Kızılırmak River
- Height: 49 m

Power Station
- Installed capacity: 76 MW

Kesikköprü Dam is a 49-metre (161 ft)-tall earthen embankment dam on the Kızılırmak River near Ankara, Turkey. The development was backed by the Turkish State Hydraulic Works. Construction on the dam began in 1959 and was finished in 1966. The dam irrigates an area of 6,600 hectares and has a maximum hydroelectricity production of 76 MW.

== See also ==
- List of dams and reservoirs in Turkey
