= St. Nicolai, Lüneburg =

St. Nicolai
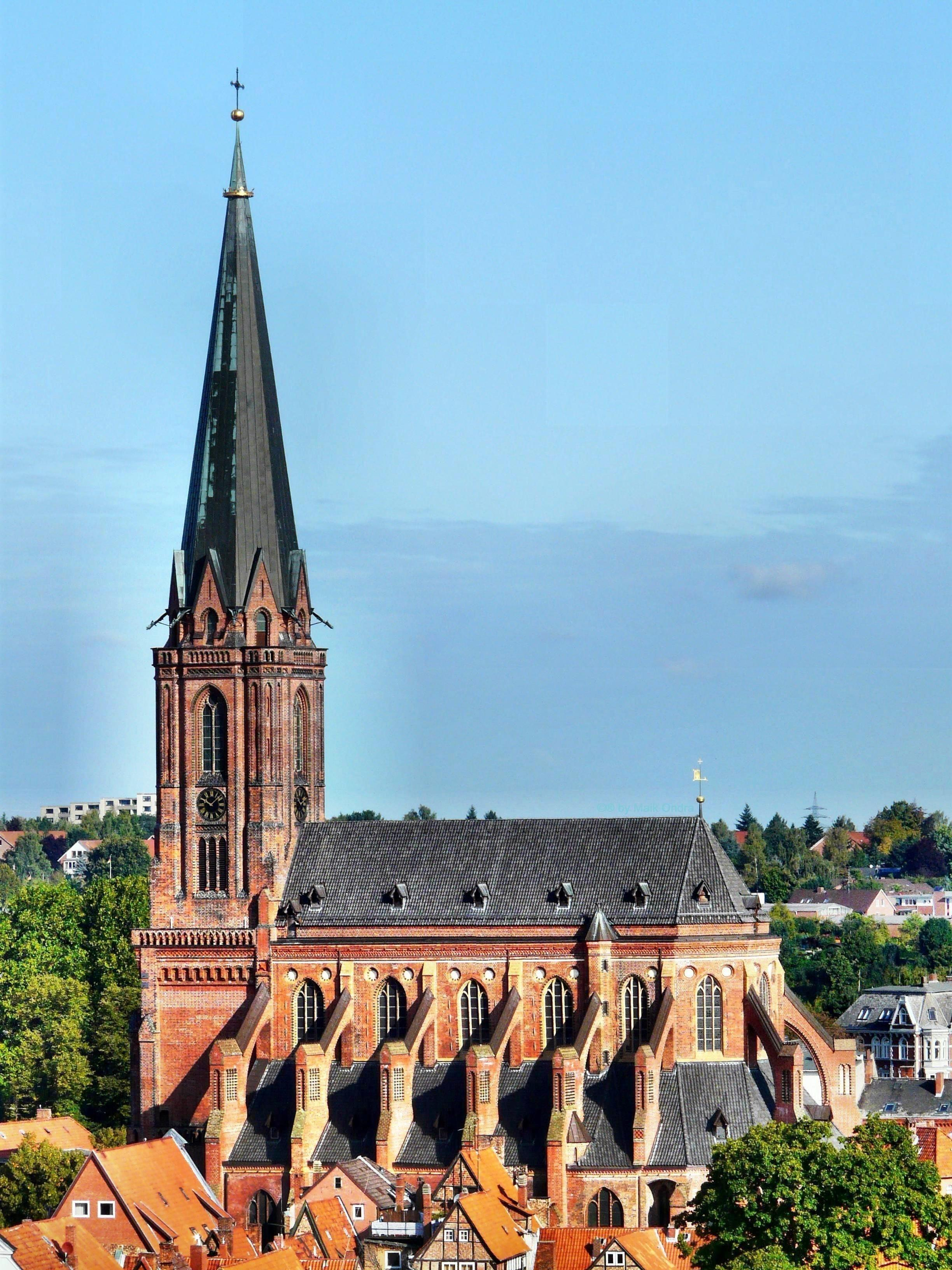
- St. Nicolai
- 53°15′6″N 10°24′36″E
- Location: Lüneburg, Lower Saxony
- Country: Germany
- Denomination: Lutheran
- Previous denomination: Catholic
- Website: www.st-nicolai.eu

History
- Dedication: St. Nicholas
- Consecrated: 1440

Architecture
- Architectural type: Basilica
- Style: Brick Gothic

St. Nicolai is a church and Lutheran parish in Lüneburg, Lower Saxony, Germany. It is one of three main churches in the town, all built in brick Gothic style. The church, dedicated to St. Nicholas, is a basilica with three naves, built from 1407 to 1440. It features a "star" rib vault that is unique in Northern Germany. When the Reformation was introduced in Lüneburg in 1530, the church became Lutheran. The high steeple was added in the 19th century.

== History ==
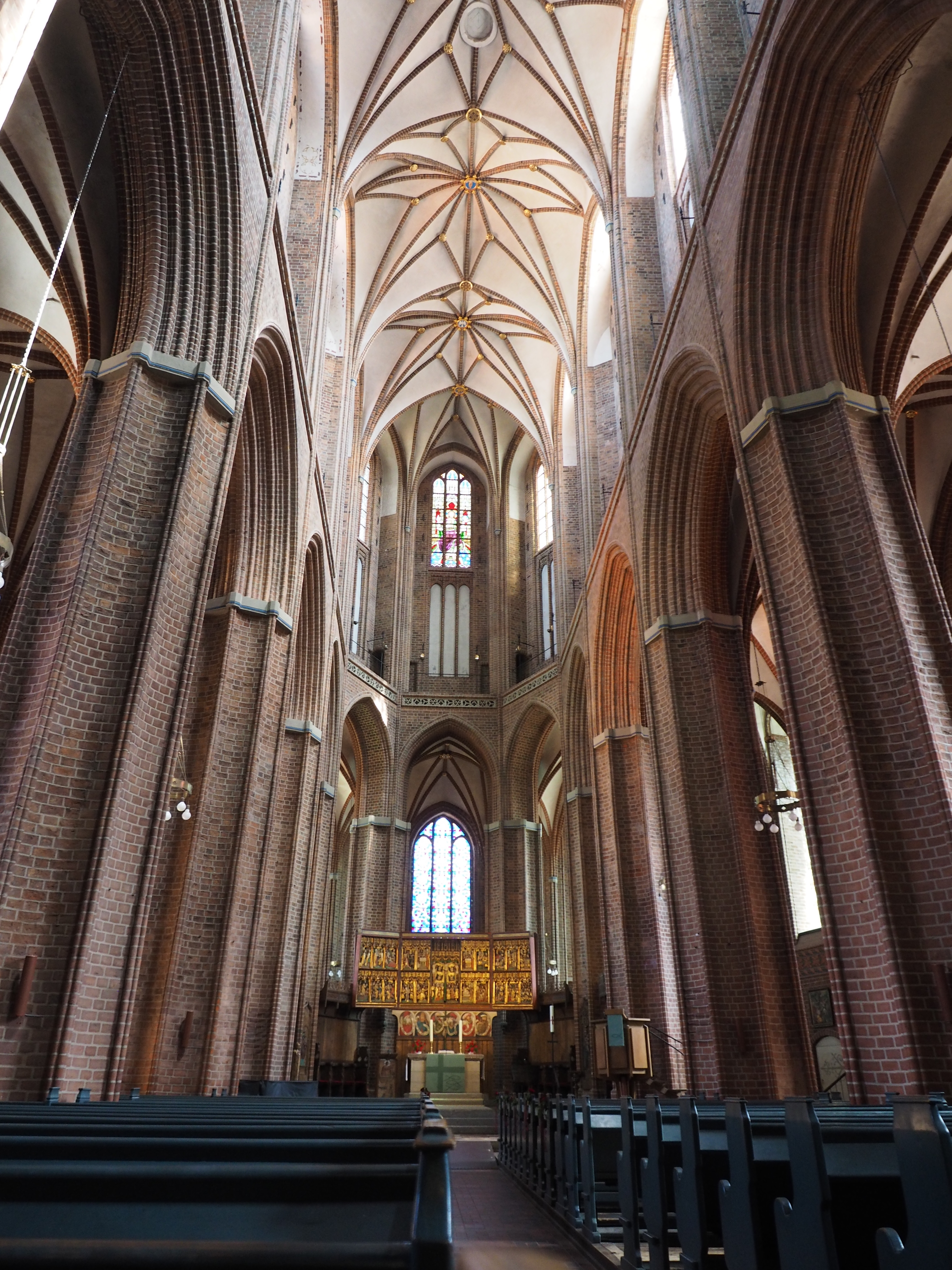
Nave towards the altar

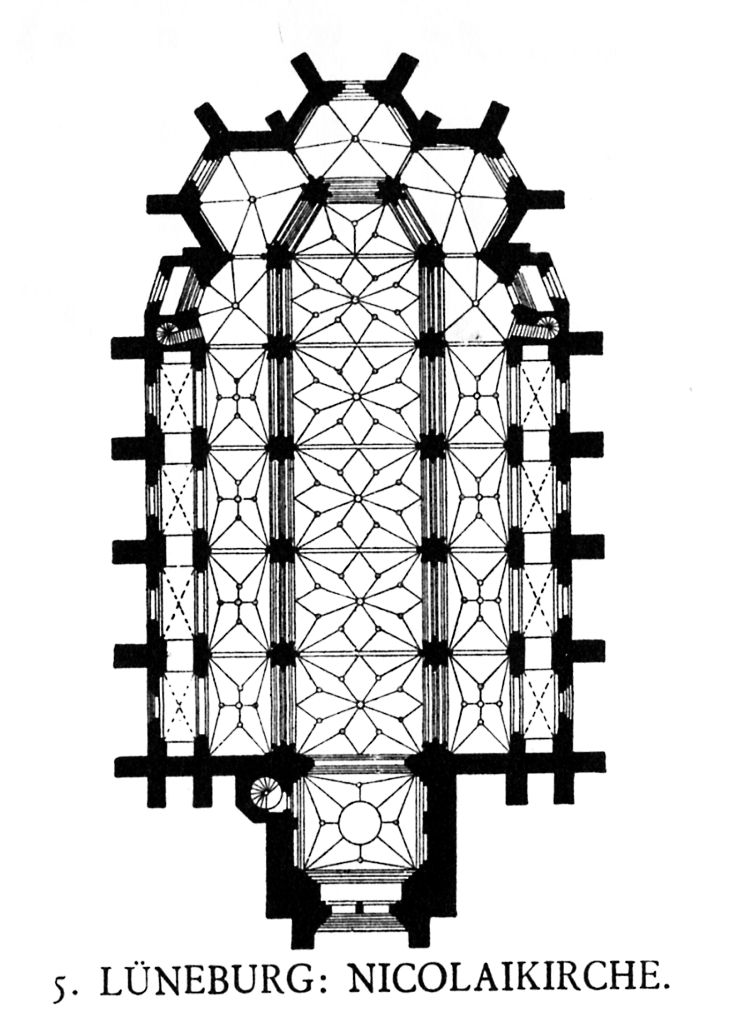
Floor plan

The building was erected on the site of a former chapel which the town council had initiated while other churches were built by religious orders. It served the people of the Wasserviertel and was consecrated in 1409, to Saint Nicholas. In 1420, the town council decided to expand the chapel to a church, which was completed in 1440. The church is one of the latest brick Gothic basilicas. It features a prominent nave with a "star" rib vault which is unique in today Northern Germany.

Twenty years later, a steeple was built, but it was not completed due to financing problems, and proved unstable. When the Reformation was introduced in Lüneburg in 1530, the first Lutheran sermon in town was given in St. Nicolai. The steeple was finished with a Helm in 1587. It was demolished in 1831 because it reached a state beyond repair. Due to problems of the foundation, the nave was also damaged. In 1843, an association for the rescue of the church was (Verein zur Rettung der Kirche), achieving first a stabilisation of the nave, then the building of a new steeple. The restorations during the 19th century changed the original appearance. The prominent steeple was built in 1895/96 in Gothic Revival style. It is one of the highest in the state.

The church is one of the attractions of the European Route of Brick Gothic.

== Furnishings ==
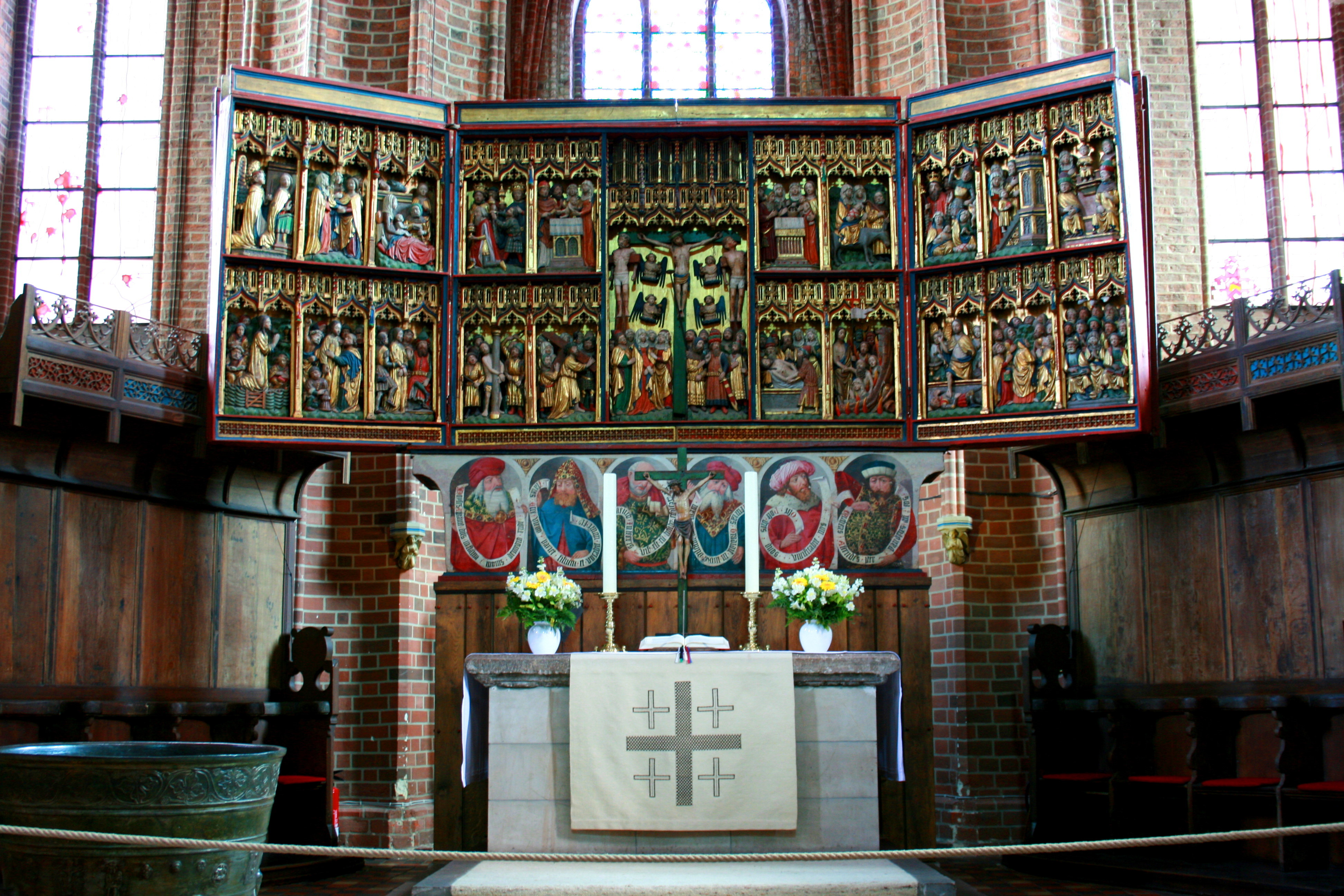
Main altar

The church features several treasures of Gothic painting and carving artistry. The main altar came from St. Lamberti, another Lüneburg church which was demolished in 1861. The altar was carved by Hans Snitker, with paintings attributed to Hans Bornemann. Its predella shows six prophets in the garb of medieval merchants.

Behind the choir (Chorumgang), parts of a former high altar from the dissolved monastery Heiligenthal are shown. It features reliefs carved in Lüneburg c. 1425 and paintings from c. 1450 with four scenes from the life of the saints Laurentius and Andreas. One of the paintings contains one of the earliest views of the town. They are also attributed to Hans Bornemann.

Modern stained-glass windows were created by Johannes Schreiter in 1987.

=== Organ ===
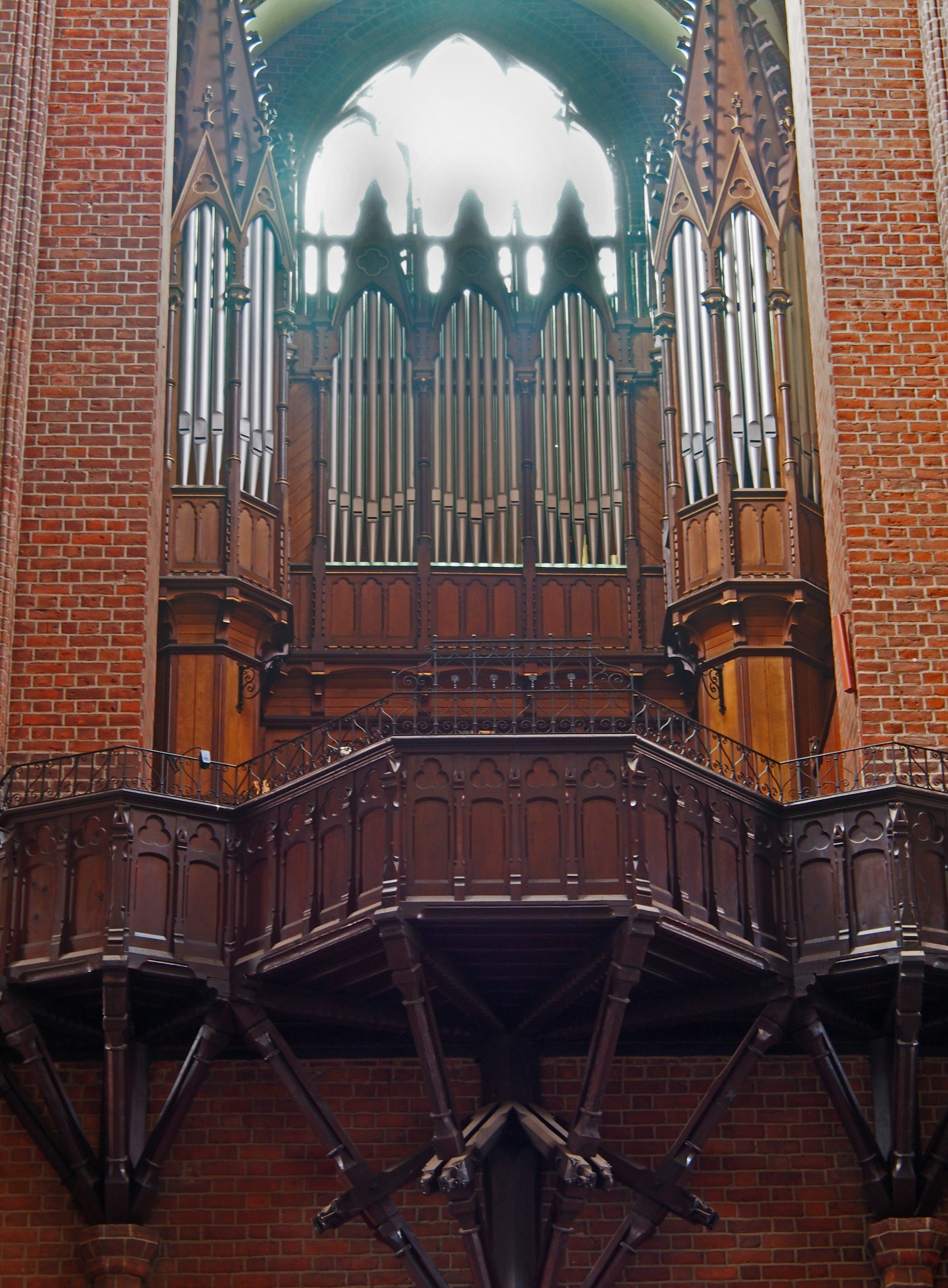
The organ

The organ was built in 1899 by the firm Furtwängler & Hammer. In the 20th century, the disposition was changed several times by Emil Hammer from Arnum. The instrument was electrified in 1979 by Walcker & Cie. In 2002, the organ builder Lenter restored the original 1899 version with 49 stops.

== Literature ==
- Fritz von Osterhausen: St. Nicolai in Lüneburg (Große Baudenkmäler, No. 342). 5th ed, München/Berlin 1996
- Hansjörg Rümelin: St. Nicolai in Lüneburg. Bauen in einer norddeutschen Hansestadt 1405–1840 (= Veröffentlichungen der Historischen Kommission für Niedersachsen und Bremen. 248; Beiträge zur Architektur- und Kulturgeschichte. Leibniz Universität Hannover. 2). Hahnsche Buchhandlung, Hannover 2009, ISBN 978-3-7752-6048-0.
