= List of populated places in Kırşehir Province =

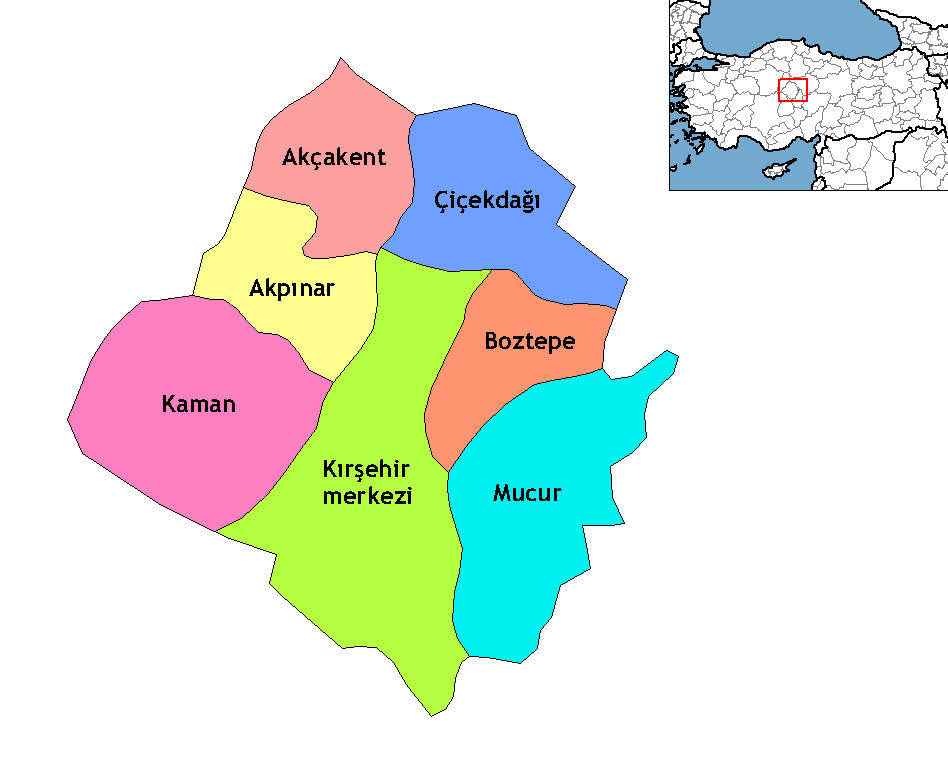
Kırşehir Province

Below is the list of populated places in Kırşehir Province, Turkey by the districts. In the following lists first place in each list is the administrative center of the district.

== Kırşehir ==
- Kırşehir
- Akçaağıl, Kırşehir
- Çadırlıhacıyusuf, Kırşehir
- Çayağzı, Kırşehir
- Çuğun, Kırşehir
- Dedeli, Kırşehir
- Değirmenkaşı, Kırşehir
- Dulkadirli, Kırşehir
- Dulkadirlikaraisa, Kırşehir
- Dulkadirliyarımkale, Kırşehir
- Ecikağıl, Kırşehir
- Göllü, Kırşehir
- Güzler, Kırşehir
- Hashüyük, Kırşehir
- Homurlu Beşler, Kırşehir
- Homurlu Üçler, Kırşehir
- Kalankaldı, Kırşehir
- Karaboğaz, Kırşehir
- Karaduraklı, Kırşehir
- Karahıdır, Kırşehir
- Karalar, Kırşehir
- Karıncalı, Kırşehir
- Kartalkaya, Kırşehir
- Kesikköprü, Kırşehir
- Kırkpınar, Kırşehir
- Kocabey, Kırşehir
- Kortulu, Kırşehir
- Körpınar, Kırşehir
- Kurtbeliyeniyapan, Kırşehir
- Kuruağıl, Kırşehir
- Özbağ, Kırşehir
- Saraycık, Kırşehir
- Sevdiğin, Kırşehir
- Seyrekköy, Kırşehir
- Sıdıklıbüyükoba, Kırşehir
- Sıdıklıdarboğaz, Kırşehir
- Sıdıklıikizağıl, Kırşehir
- Sıdıklıkumarkaç, Kırşehir
- Sıdıklıküçükboğaz, Kırşehir
- Sıdıklıküçükoba, Kırşehir
- Sıdıklıortaoba, Kırşehir
- Taburoğlu, Kırşehir
- Tatarilyaskışla, Kırşehir
- Tatarilyasyayla, Kırşehir
- Tepesidelik, Kırşehir
- Toklümen, Kırşehir
- Tosunburnu, Kırşehir
- Ulupınar, Kırşehir
- Uzunaliuşağı, Kırşehir
- Yağmurluarmutlu, Kırşehir
- Yağmurlubüyükoba, Kırşehir
- Yağmurlukale, Kırşehir
- Yağmurlusayobası, Kırşehir
- Yeşilli, Kırşehir
- Yeşiloba, Kırşehir
- Yukarı Homurlu, Kırşehir

== Akpınar ==
- Akpınar
- Alişar, Akpınar
- Aşağıhomurlu, Akpınar
- Boyalık, Akpınar
- Büyükabdiuşağı, Akpınar
- Çalıburnu, Akpınar
- Çayözü, Akpınar
- Çebişler, Akpınar
- Çelebiuşağı, Akpınar
- Çiftlikmehmetağa, Akpınar
- Çiftliksarıkaya, Akpınar
- Demirci, Akpınar
- Deveci, Akpınar
- Durmuşlu, Akpınar
- Eldeleklidemirel, Akpınar
- Eldelekliortaoba, Akpınar
- Eşrefli, Akpınar
- Gülveren, Akpınar
- Hacımirza, Akpınar
- Hacıselimli, Akpınar
- Hanyerisarıkaya, Akpınar
- Himmetuşağı, Akpınar
- Karaova, Akpınar
- Kelismailuşağı, Akpınar
- Köşker, Akpınar
- Pekmezci, Akpınar
- Sofrazlı, Akpınar

== Akçakent ==
- Akçakent
- Avanoğlu, Akçakent
- Ayvalı, Akçakent 147
- Derefakılı, Akçakent 123
- Güllühüyük, Akçakent 75
- Hacıfakılı, Akçakent 256
- Hamzabey, Akçakent 358
- Hasanali, Akçakent 90
- Kilimli, Akçakent 333
- Kösefakılı, Akçakent 149
- Küçükabdiuşağı, Akçakent
- Mahsenli, Akçakent 84
- Ödemişli, Akçakent 74
- Ömeruşağı, Akçakent 684
- Polatlı, Akçakent 481
- Solakuşağı, Akçakent 198
- Taşlıoluk, Akçakent 179
- Tepefakılı, Akçakent 144
- Yaylaözü, Akçakent 135
- Yeşildere, Akçakent 173
- Yetikli, Akçakent 48

== Boztepe ==
- Boztepe
- Alişar, Akpınar
- Aşağıhomurlu, Akpınar
- Boyalık, Akpınar
- Büyükabdiuşağı, Akpınar
- Çalıburnu, Akpınar
- Çayözü, Akpınar
- Çebişler, Akpınar
- Çelebiuşağı, Akpınar
- Çiftlikmehmetağa, Akpınar
- Çiftliksarıkaya, Akpınar
- Demirci, Akpınar
- Deveci, Akpınar
- Durmuşlu, Akpınar
- Eldeleklidemirel, Akpınar
- Eldelekliortaoba, Akpınar
- Eşrefli, Akpınar
- Gülveren, Akpınar
- Hacımirza, Akpınar
- Hacıselimli, Akpınar
- Hanyerisarıkaya, Akpınar
- Himmetuşağı, Akpınar
- Karaova, Akpınar
- Kelismailuşağı, Akpınar
- Köşker, Akpınar
- Pekmezci, Akpınar
- Sofrazlı, Akpınar

== Çiçekdağı ==
- Çiçekdağı
- Akbıyıklı, Çiçekdağı
- Alahacılı, Çiçekdağı
- Alanköy, Çiçekdağı
- Alimpınar, Çiçekdağı
- Armutlu, Çiçekdağı
- Aşağıhacıahmetli, Çiçekdağı
- Bahçepınar, Çiçekdağı
- Baraklı, Çiçekdağı
- Beşikli, Çiçekdağı
- Boğazevci, Çiçekdağı
- Bozlar, Çiçekdağı
- Büyükteflek, Çiçekdağı
- Çanakpınar, Çiçekdağı
- Çepni, Çiçekdağı
- Çiçekli, Çiçekdağı
- Çopraşık, Çiçekdağı
- Çubuktarla, Çiçekdağı
- Demirli, Çiçekdağı
- Doğankaş, Çiçekdağı
- Gölcük, Çiçekdağı
- Hacıduraklı, Çiçekdağı
- Hacıhasanlı, Çiçekdağı
- Hacıoğlu, Çiçekdağı
- Halaçlı, Çiçekdağı
- Harmanpınar, Çiçekdağı
- Haydarlı, Çiçekdağı
- İbikli, Çiçekdağı
- Kabaklı, Çiçekdağı
- Kaleevci, Çiçekdağı
- Kavaklıöz, Çiçekdağı
- Kırdök, Çiçekdağı
- Kızılcalı, Çiçekdağı
- Konurkale, Çiçekdağı
- Köseli, Çiçekdağı
- Küçükteflek, Çiçekdağı
- Mahmutlu, Çiçekdağı
- Ortahacıahmetli, Çiçekdağı
- Pöhrenk, Çiçekdağı
- Safalı, Çiçekdağı
- Şahinoğlu, Çiçekdağı
- Tatbekirli, Çiçekdağı
- Tepecik, Çiçekdağı
- Topalali, Çiçekdağı
- Yalnızağaç, Çiçekdağı
- Yukarıhacıahmetli, Çiçekdağı

== Kaman ==
- Kaman
- Ağapınar, Kaman
- Aydınlar, Kaman
- Başköy, Kaman
- Bayındır, Kaman
- Bayramözü, Kaman
- Benzer, Kaman
- Büğüz, Kaman
- Çadırlı Hacıbayram, Kaman
- Çadırlı Körmehmet, Kaman
- Çağırkan, Kaman
- Darıözü, Kaman
- Değirmenözü, Kaman
- Demirli, Kaman
- Esentepe, Kaman
- Fakılı, Kaman
- Gökeşme, Kaman
- Gültepe, Kaman
- Hamit, Kaman
- Hirfanlı, Kaman
- İbrişim, Kaman
- İkizler, Kaman
- İmancı, Kaman
- İsahocalı, Kaman
- Kale, Kaman
- Karahabalı, Kaman
- Karakaya, Kaman
- Kargınyenice, Kaman
- Karkınkızıközü, Kaman
- Karkınmeşe, Kaman
- Karkınselimağa, Kaman
- Kekilliali, Kaman
- Kurancılı, Kaman
- Meşeköy, Kaman
- Mollaosmanlar, Kaman
- Ömerhacılı, Kaman
- Ömerkahya, Kaman
- Sarıömerli, Kaman
- Savcılıbağbaşı, Kaman
- Savcılıbüyükoba, Kaman
- Savcılıebeyit, Kaman
- Savcılıkışla, Kaman
- Savcılıkurutlu, Kaman
- Savcılımeryemkaşı, Kaman
- Tatık, Kaman
- Tepeköy, Kaman
- Yağmurlu Sarıuşağı, Kaman
- Yazıyolu, Kaman
- Yelek, Kaman
- Yeniköy, Kaman
- Yeniyapan, Kaman
- Yukarı Çiftlik, Kaman

== Mucur ==
- Mucur
- Aksaklı Mucur
- Altınyazı, Mucur
- Asmakaradam, Mucur
- Avcıköy, Mucur
- Aydoğmuş, Mucur
- Babur, Mucur
- Bayramuşağı, Mucur
- Bazlamaç, Mucur
- Budak, Mucur
- Büyükkayapa, Mucur
- Çatalarkaç, Mucur
- Dağçiftliğiköyü, Mucur
- Dalakçı, Mucur
- Devepınarı, Mucur
- Geycek, Mucur
- Gümüşkümbet, Mucur
- Güzyurdu, Mucur
- İnaç, Mucur
- Karaarkaç, Mucur
- Karacalı, Mucur
- Karakuyu, Mucur
- Karkın, Mucur
- Kepez, Mucur
- Kılıçlı, Mucur
- Kıran, Mucur
- Kızılağıl, Mucur
- Kızıldağyeniyapan, Mucur
- Kurugöl, Mucur
- Kuşaklı, Mucur
- Küçükburnağıl, Mucur
- Küçükkavak, Mucur
- Küçükkayapa, Mucur
- Medetsiz, Mucur
- Obruk, Mucur
- Palangıç, Mucur
- Pınarkaya, Mucur
- Rahmalar, Mucur
- Seyfe, Mucur
- Susuz, Mucur
- Yazıkınık, Mucur
- Yeğenağa, Mucur
- Yeniköy, Mucur
- Yeşilyurt, Mucur
- Yürücek, Mucur
