= Altınyazı, Mucur =

Altınyazı
- Village
- Location within Turkey Location within Turkey Central Anatolia
- Coordinates: 38°59′46″N 34°25′30″E
- Country: Turkey
- Province: Kırşehir
- District: Mucur
- Population (2022): 115
- Time zone: UTC+3 (TRT)

Altınyazı is a village in Mucur District, Kırşehir Province, Turkey. Its population was 115 in (2022).

== Etymology ==
The old name of Altınyazı was Aflak and it came from an old Seljukid general, who died there.

== History ==
The village was founded about 2,000 years ago. Sometimes the village has been destroyed and been refounded. There is also an old church built in the year 300 by the Byzantines. The village also has an ancient underground city.

== Geography ==
Altınyazı is in a steppe called bozkır. It is also very mountainous. Ağa tepe and Kızlar tepesi are the two highest peaks in Altınyazı. They are 1,047 metres (3,435 ft) above sea level .Altınyazı is 29 km away from Kırşehir, 8 km from Mucur and 220 km from Ankara. The summers are hot and dry and the winters are cold.

== Education ==
There is no school in Altınyazı.
