= Bozlak =

Bozlak is a form of Turkish folk song from Central Anatolia accompanied by the long-necked baglama (divan sazı), davul and zurna. The main subjects of the melancholic songs are separation and love. The songs begin with a very high pitched vocal and end in a low vocal. The best known players are Toklumenli Aşık Said, Muharrem Ertaş, Neşet Ertaş, Hacı Taşan and Çekiç Ali.

Bozlak, which is a form of uzun hava (long tune) in Turkish Folk Music, has been a form of music starting from Central Anatolia and an expression of the cultures of the Yoruk / Turkmen and Avshar tribes which pursue a way of life based on yaylak (summer highland pasture)- and kislak (winter pasture). In terms of meaning, the word ‘bozlak’ has the meanings of to shout, to yell, to cry out, and to burst out. The bursting out of the sorrow, desolation and the outbreak that the Turkmens and Avshars experienced in daily life to the nature caused the emergence of the bozlak culture. Turkmens, Avshars and the Abdals who existed among these tribes have transferred the tradition of bozlak to our day.

The term ‘bozlak’ means to scream, to revolt; ‘to struggle’ and with this frame this term is used to deal with social concepts such as death, separate, and pain, and it is seen in the several parts of the country especially in the Middle Anatolia and Çukurova region, and two different style; ‘Avshar style’ and ‘Turkmen style’ is used in ‘bozlak’ thus, using two different makam (tones).

== See also ==
- Sazanda
- Gakkili havasi
- Dattiri havasi
