= Çiçekdağı =

- Municipality
- Location in Turkey Çiçekdağı (Turkey Central Anatolia)
- Coordinates: 39°36′25″N 34°24′31″E
- Country: Turkey
- Province: Kırşehir
- District: Çiçekdağı

Government
  - Mayor: Hasan Hakanoğlu (AKP)
- Elevation: 917 m (3,009 ft)
- Population (2022): 6,298
- Time zone: UTC+3 (TRT)
- Area code: 0386
- Website: www.cicekdagi.bel.tr

Çiçekdağı is a town in Kırşehir Province in the Central Anatolia region of Turkey. It is the seat of Çiçekdağı District. Its population is 6,298 (2022).

== History ==
From 1867 until 1922, Çiçekdağı was part of Angora vilayet.

== Climate ==
Çiçekdağı's climate is classified as cold semi-arid (Köppen: BSk). The town experiences hot, dry summers and chilly, frequently snowy winters.

Climate data for Çiçekdağı (1991–2020)
Month	Jan	Feb	Mar	Apr	May	Jun	Jul	Aug	Sep	Oct	Nov	Dec	Year
Mean daily maximum °C (°F)	4.2 (39.6)	6.9 (44.4)	12.4 (54.3)	17.8 (64.0)	22.7 (72.9)	27.1 (80.8)	30.9 (87.6)	31.1 (88.0)	26.7 (80.1)	20.5 (68.9)	12.3 (54.1)	6.0 (42.8)	18.3 (64.9)
Daily mean °C (°F)	0.3 (32.5)	2.1 (35.8)	6.8 (44.2)	11.7 (53.1)	16.3 (61.3)	20.4 (68.7)	23.8 (74.8)	23.9 (75.0)	19.7 (67.5)	14.3 (57.7)	7.1 (44.8)	2.1 (35.8)	12.4 (54.3)
Mean daily minimum °C (°F)	−3.2 (26.2)	−2.0 (28.4)	1.7 (35.1)	5.9 (42.6)	10.2 (50.4)	13.7 (56.7)	16.7 (62.1)	16.9 (62.4)	12.9 (55.2)	8.6 (47.5)	2.5 (36.5)	−1.2 (29.8)	6.9 (44.4)
Average precipitation mm (inches)	32.81 (1.29)	27.91 (1.10)	36.59 (1.44)	37.78 (1.49)	52.33 (2.06)	32.86 (1.29)	9.94 (0.39)	11.19 (0.44)	14.31 (0.56)	22.07 (0.87)	32.62 (1.28)	36.38 (1.43)	346.79 (13.65)
Average precipitation days (≥ 1.0 mm)	6.6	5.7	6.3	6.9	8.3	5.6	2.3	2.5	2.9	4.5	5.0	6.4	63.0
Average relative humidity (%)	74.7	67.1	57.9	54.6	54.7	50.1	43.4	44.0	44.9	54.3	64.7	75.8	57.2
Source: NOAA

== Notable natives ==
- Muharrem Ertaş (1913-1984), folk musician
- Neşet Ertaş (1938-2012), folk musician
