= Akçakent District =

District of Kırşehir Province, Turkey

- District
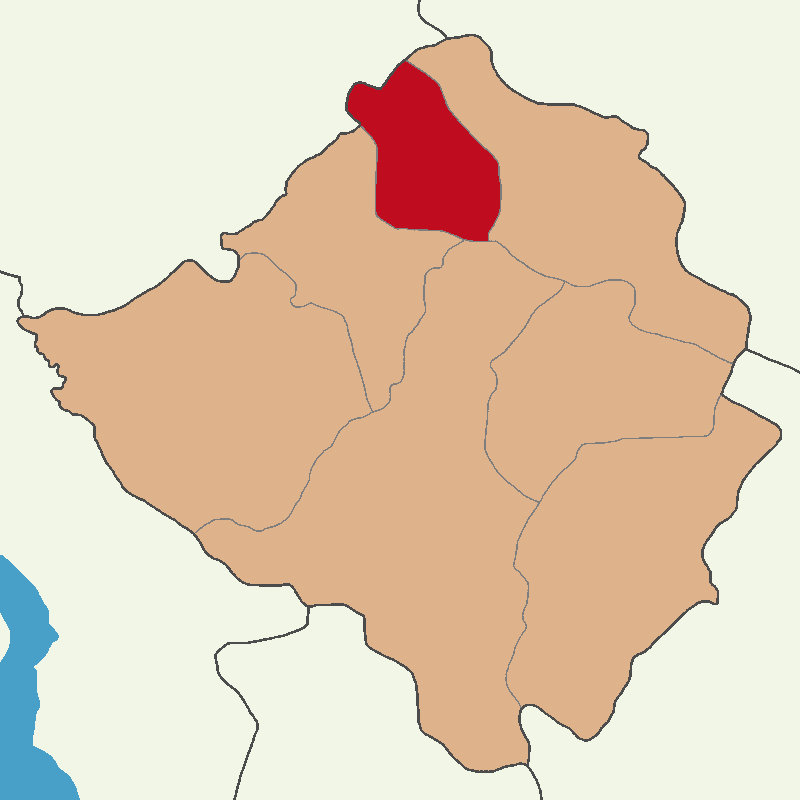
- Map showing Akçakent District in Kırşehir Province

- Location within Turkey Location within Turkey Central Anatolia
- Coordinates: 39°37′N 34°05′E
- Country: Turkey
- Province: Kırşehir
- Seat: Akçakent

Government
  - Kaymakam: Hüseyin Aydın
- Area: 370 km^{2} (140 sq mi)
- Population (2022): 3,519
  - Density: 9.5/km^{2} (25/sq mi)
- Time zone: UTC+3 (TRT)
- Website: www.akcakent.gov.tr

Akçakent District is a district of the Kırşehir Province of Turkey. Its seat is the town of Akçakent. Its area is 370 km^{2}, and its population is 3,519 (2022).

The district was formed in 1990.

== Composition ==
There is one municipality in Akçakent District:

- Akçakent

There are 20 villages in Akçakent District:

- Avanoğlu
- Ayvalı
- Derefakılı
- Güllühüyük
- Hacıfakılı
- Hamzabey
- Hasanali
- Kilimli
- Kösefakılı
- Küçükabdiuşağı
- Mahsenli
- Ödemişli
- Ömeruşağı
- Polatlı
- Solakuşağı
- Taşoluk
- Tepefakılı
- Yaylaözü
- Yeşildere
- Yetikli
