= Kırşehir District =

District of Kırşehir Province, Turkey

- District
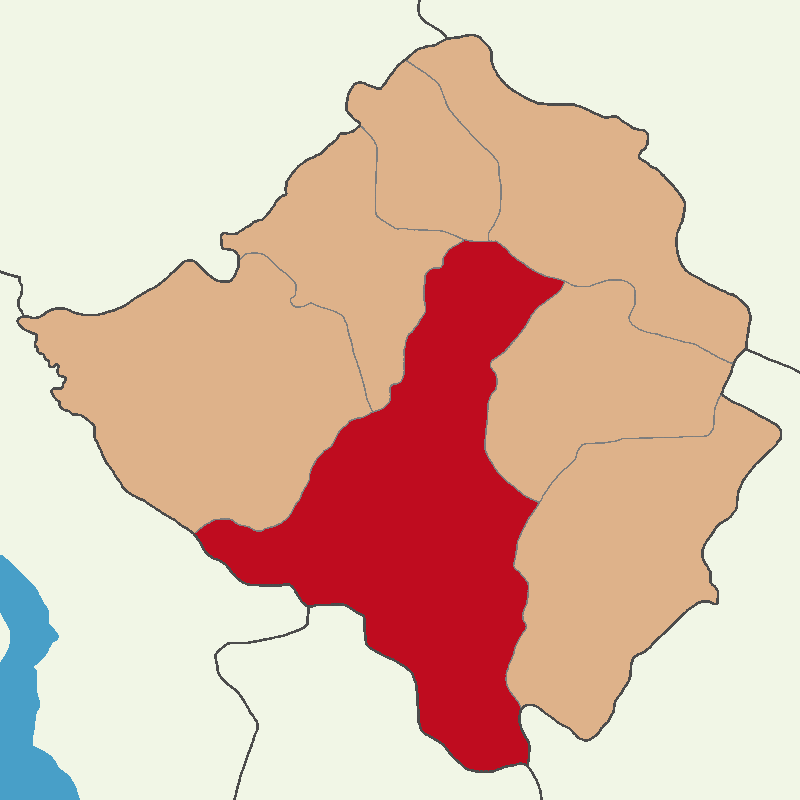
- Map showing Kırşehir District in Kırşehir Province

- Location in Turkey Kırşehir District (Turkey Central Anatolia)
- Coordinates: 39°09′N 34°10′E
- Country: Turkey
- Province: Kırşehir
- Seat: Kırşehir
- Area: 1,719 km^{2} (664 sq mi)
- Population (2022): 163,219
  - Density: 95/km^{2} (250/sq mi)
- Time zone: UTC+3 (TRT)

Kırşehir District (also: Merkez, meaning "central" in Turkish) is a district of the Kırşehir Province of Turkey. Its seat is the city of Kırşehir. Its area is 1,719 km^{2}, and its population is 163,219 (2022).

== Composition ==
There are two municipalities in Kırşehir District:

- Kırşehir
- Özbağ

There are 53 villages in Kırşehir District:

- Akçaağıl
- Çadırlıhacıyusuf
- Çayağzı
- Çoğun
- Dedeli
- Değirmenkaşı
- Dulkadirli
- Dulkadirli Karaisa
- Ecikağıl
- Göllü
- Güzler
- Hamurlubeşler
- Hamurluüçler
- Hashüyük
- Kalankaldı
- Karaboğaz
- Karaduraklı
- Karahıdır
- Karalar
- Karıncalı
- Kartalkaya
- Kesikköprü
- Kırkpınar
- Kocabey
- Kortulu
- Körpınar
- Kurtbeliyeniyapan
- Kuruağıl
- Saraycık
- Sevdiğin
- Seyrekköy
- Sıdıklı Büyükoba
- Sıdıklı Darboğaz
- Sıdıklı Ikizağıl
- Sıdıklı Küçükboğaz
- Sıdıklı Küçükoba
- Sıdıklı Kumarkaç
- Sıdıklıortaoba
- Taburoğlu
- Tatarilyaskışla
- Tatarilyasyayla
- Tepesidelik
- Tokluman
- Tosunburnu
- Ulupınar
- Uzunaliuşağı
- Yağmurluarmutlu
- Yağmurlubüyükoba
- Yağmurlukale
- Yağmurlusayobası
- Yeşilli
- Yeşiloba
- Yukarıhamurlu
