= Kurancılı =

- Municipality
- Location in Turkey Kurancılı (Turkey Central Anatolia)
- Coordinates: 39°19′55″N 33°54′6″E
- Country: Turkey
- Province: Kırşehir
- District: Kaman
- Population (2022): 1,857
- Time zone: UTC+3 (TRT)

Kurancılı is a town (belde) in the Kaman District, Kırşehir Province, Turkey. Its population is 1,857 (2022).
