= Boztepe District =

District of Kırşehir Province, Turkey

- District
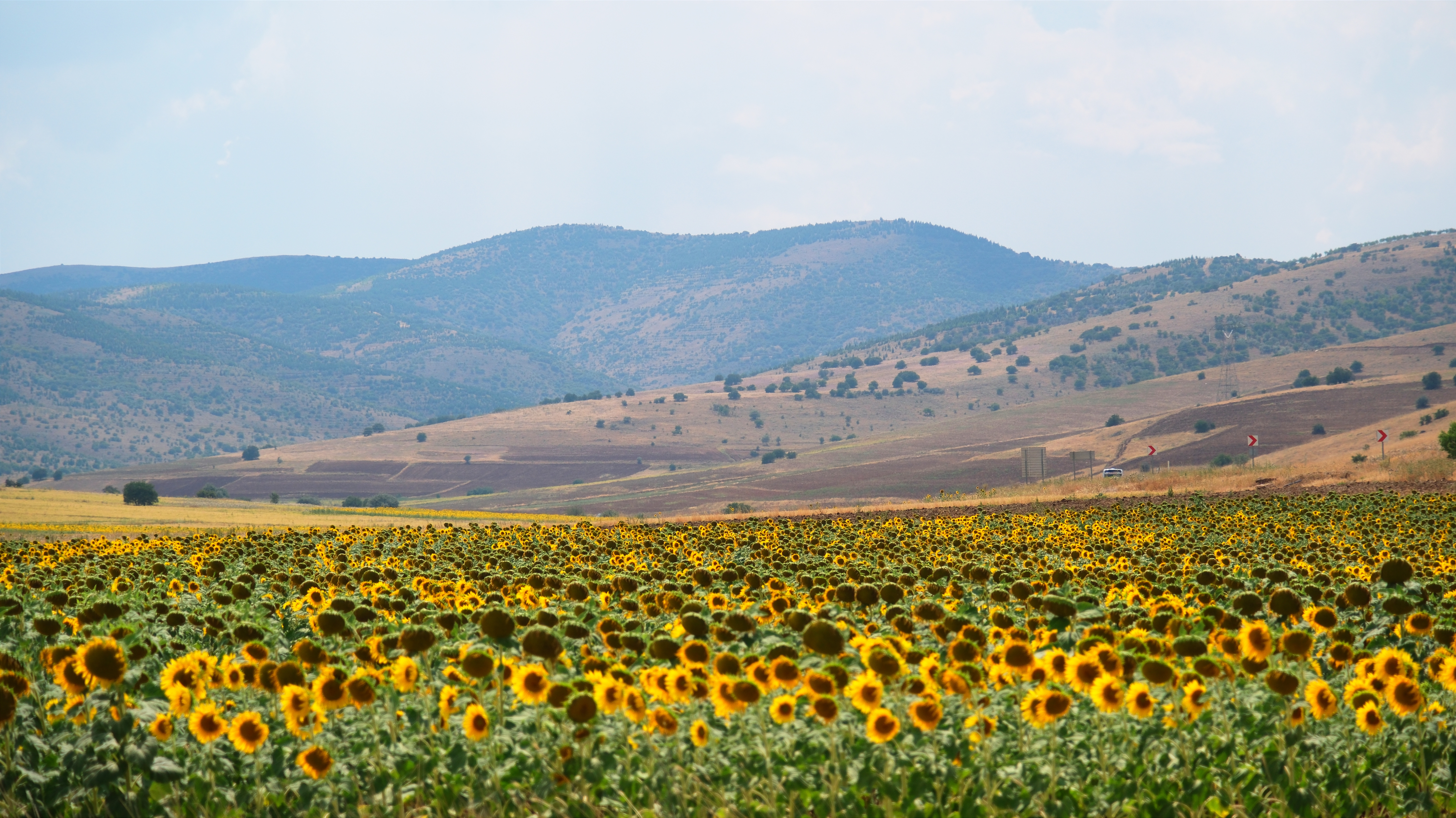
- Karacaören countryside, Boztepe

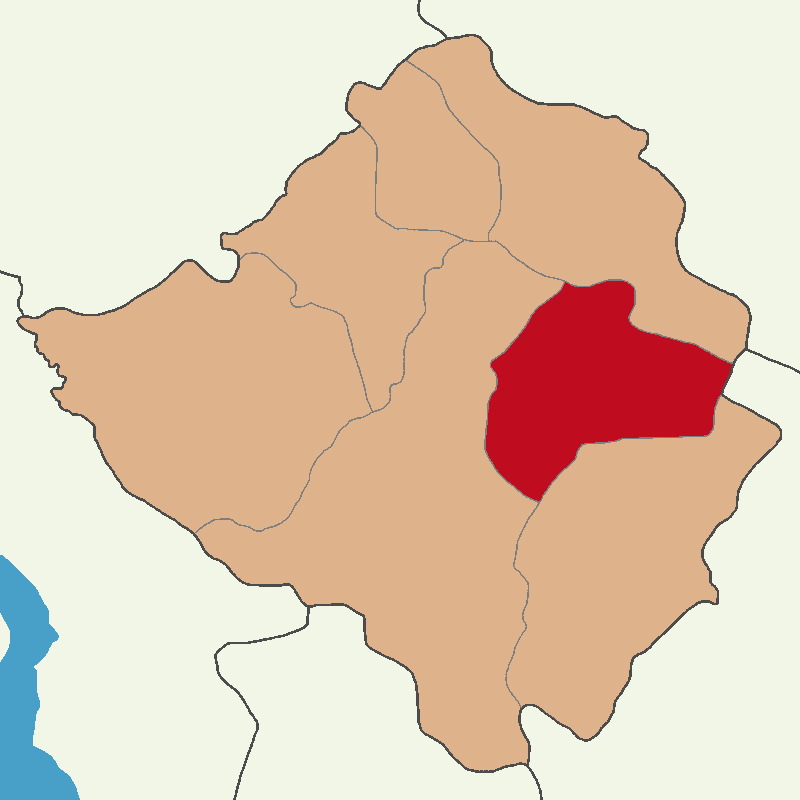
- Map showing Boztepe District in Kırşehir Province

- Location within Turkey Location within Turkey Central Anatolia
- Coordinates: 39°16′N 34°15′E
- Country: Turkey
- Province: Kırşehir
- Seat: Boztepe

Government
  - Kaymakam: Nurettin Yavuz
- Area: 747 km^{2} (288 sq mi)
- Population (2022): 5,019
  - Density: 6.72/km^{2} (17.4/sq mi)
- Time zone: UTC+3 (TRT)
- Website: www.boztepe.gov.tr

Boztepe District is a district of the Kırşehir Province of Turkey. Its seat is the town of Boztepe. Its area is 747 km^{2}, and its population is 5,019 (2022).

== Composition ==
There is one municipality in Boztepe District:

- Boztepe

There are 14 villages in Boztepe District:

- Büyükkışla
- Çamalak
- Çevirme
- Çiğdeli
- Çimeli
- Eskidoğanlı
- Harmanaltı
- Hatunoğlu
- Hüseyinli
- Karacaören
- Külhüyük
- Uzunpınar
- Üçkuyu
- Yenidoğanlı
