= Akçakent =

- Municipality
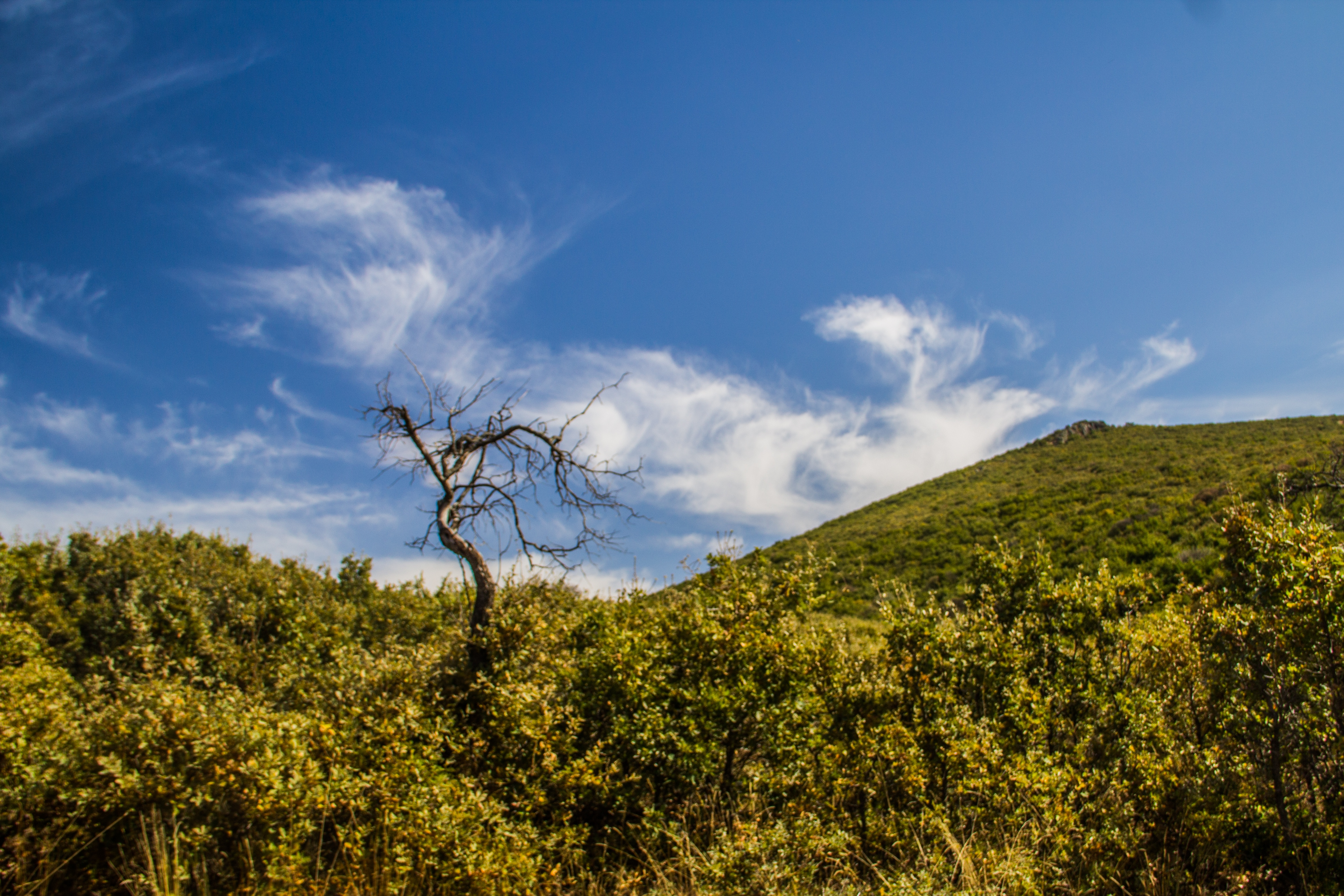
- Akçakent countryside

- Location within Turkey Location within Turkey Central Anatolia
- Coordinates: 39°37′22″N 34°05′45″E
- Country: Turkey
- Province: Kırşehir
- District: Akçakent

Government
  - Mayor: Yılmaz Kılıç (AKP)
- Elevation: 1,404 m (4,606 ft)
- Population (2022): 755
- Time zone: UTC+3 (TRT)
- Area code: 0386

Akçakent is a town in Kırşehir Province in the Central Anatolia region of Turkey. It is the seat of Akçakent District. Its population is 755 (2022). Its elevation is 1,404 m (4,606 ft).
