= Neşet Ertaş =

Turkish singer and baglama musician (1938–2012)

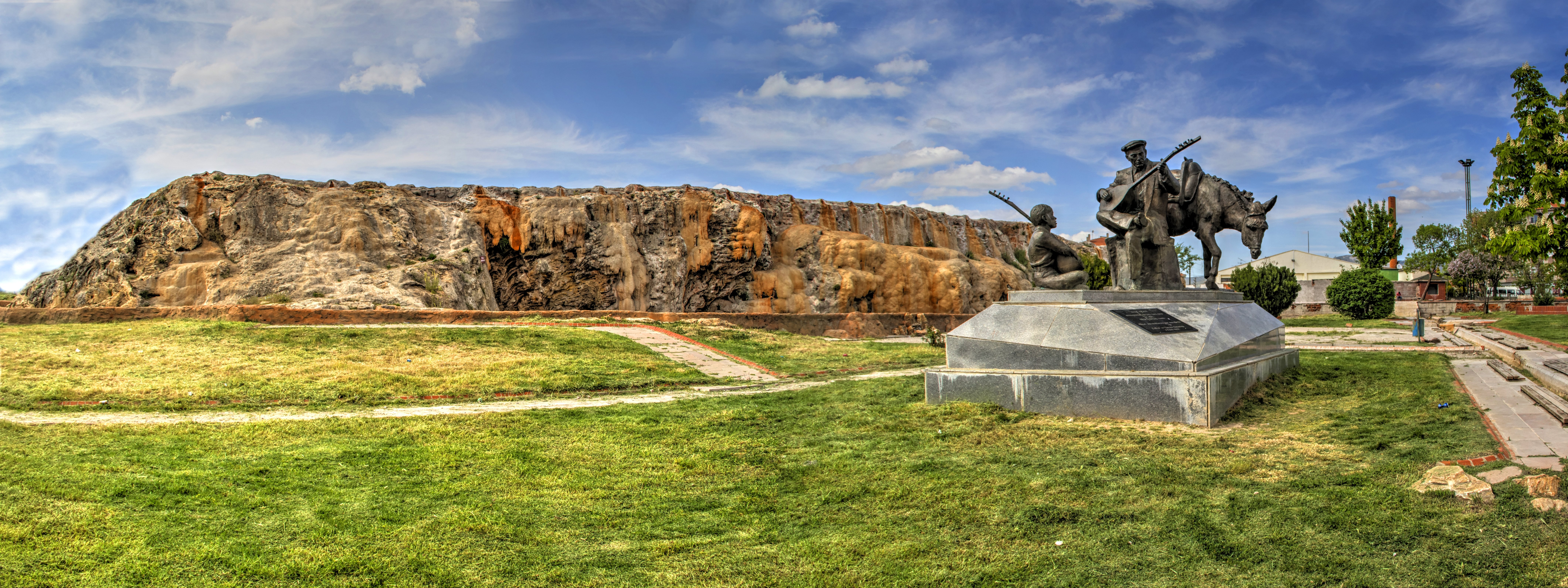
- Statue of Neşet Ertaş in Kırşehir Province

Background information
- Also known as: Bozkırın Tezenesi (Plectrum of the Steppe)
- Born: 1938; Çiçekdağı, Kırşehir, Turkey
- Died: 25 September 2012 (aged 73–74) İzmir, Turkey
- Genre: Turkish folk music
- Occupations: Songwriter, singer, player
- Instruments: Bağlama, violin
- Years active: 1954–2012
- Labels: Kalan Müzik (1999–2005); Bayar Müzik (2005–2012)
- Website: www.nesetertas.com.tr

Neşet Ertaş (1938 – 25 September 2012) was a Turkish folk music artist, lyricist, modern ashik and virtuoso of the traditional Turkish instrument the bağlama. His profession in Turkish is known as halk ozanı, which literally means "folk bard". Yaşar Kemal gave Ertaş his nickname, "Bozkırın Tezenesi" (literally: "Plectrum of the Steppe"), writing it in a book he gave him as a gift.

== Early years and family life ==
Neşet Ertaş was born in 1938, in Kırtıllar, a village in Kırşehir. His father, Muharrem Ertaş, was also a folk poet. His mother, Döne Koç, was Muharrem's second wife, whom he married after his first wife, Hatice, died early. Neşet was the second of four children; he had an older half-brother, Necati, from his father's first marriage and two younger sisters, Ayşe and Nadiye.

His mother Döne also died early, and his father married again, to Arzu. From his third marriage four sons, Ekrem, Ali, Muharrem and Cemal, were born.

Neşet married Leyla, a singer from Bolu, in 1960 in Ankara, where the two had met while performing at a night club. They had two daughters and a son. The couple divorced after ten years of marriage.

== Music career ==
At the age of five and six, Neşet Ertaş started to play first the violin and then the bağlama, the Turkish national instrument. His father earned his living by playing at wedding ceremonies in Central Anatolian villages, and for eight years Neşet accompanied him. As a result, he was not able to finish primary school.

At the age of fourteen, Neşet Ertaş went to Istanbul, where he played at a night club in Beyoğlu. After two years, he moved to Ankara to continue his stage career there. He applied to the state-owned Turkish Radio (TRT) station in Ankara and began performing türkü, Turkish folk songs, on a daytime programme called Yurttan Sesler (literally: "Sounds from the Homeland") under the name "Neşet Ertaş of Kırşehir". At the same time, he played in night clubs at night.

He became very popular and gave concerts in many cities, in some cases six or seven times. His compositions and recordings made him renowned. But then in 1978, his fingers became paralysed. He soon became penniless and had no means of paying for treatment, since he had no other marketable skills. So in 1979 he went to Germany, where his brother was living. There, he recovered from his paralysis, and started again to perform music at wedding ceremonies and local events attended by members of the Turkish community in Germany. He also took his three children there. A German school of arts offered him a teaching post for saz playing. He accepted and served for two years in this position.

During his time in Germany, Ertaş dedicated himself to his children's education, and he was almost forgotten in his country. However, pirates continued to profit from playing his music and lyrics in Turkey. In the beginning of 2000, he protested openly against the TRT, which had stated that he was dead.

After 23 years, he returned home and was welcomed by crowds. The audience at his first concert, which took place at the Harbiye Open-Air Theatre in Istanbul, gave him a standing ovation to his great surprise, a great success after 30 years of absence. This was followed by tours around the country and free concerts. He experienced again the pleasure of meeting the people of his homeland. However, he rejected the title of "State Artist" which the Turkish state wanted to award him, saying, "I am already an artist of this state."

Ertaş's first record was released in 1957. During his career, he recorded more than 30 albums. It is claimed that due to flawed copyright laws in Turkey, he did not fully benefit from his poems, music and audio recordings.

He interpreted musical pieces of the Abdal-Turkoman tradition.

== Awards ==
In 2006, the Turkish Grand National Assembly rewarded him the State Medal of Distinguished Service, which he accepted, in his words, "on behalf of [his] ancestry".

In 2010, Neşet Ertaş was honoured with the UNESCO "National Living Human Treasure" award.

On April 25, 2011, he was awarded an honorary doctorate by Istanbul Technical University.

== Death and burial ==
Ertaş died on 25 September 2012 at the age of 74 in a hospital in İzmir after being taken in two weeks previously for prostate cancer treatment. His body was flown to Ankara, from where it was transported to Çiçekdağı in Kırşehir Province. After the religious funeral held in Ahi Evran Mosque, which was attended by high-ranked politicians such as Prime Minister Recep Tayyip Erdoğan, Minister of Culture Ertuğrul Günay and opposition leader Kemal Kılıçdaroğlu and renowned people from the Turkish music scene such as Orhan Gencebay and Arif Sağ along with ten thousand others, he was buried at the foot of his father's grave as he had requested in his will.

== Discography ==
=== Singles ===
- Neden Garip Garip Ötersin Bülbül
- Hareli Gelin
- Diloylu Halay Havası
- Varıp Bir Kız On Yaşına Değince
- Şeytanın Atına Binip Yeldirme
- Bir Leyla Misali
- Yardan Tatlısı Bulunmaz
- Engeller Koymuyor Yar Sana Varsam
- Ceylan
- Vefasız Yar Aşkına (vay bana vah bana)
- Kıbrıs Destanı (Kıbrıs Barış Harekatından Sonra Yazmış Olduğu Türküsü)
- Giyindim Kuşandım Gittim Düğüne
- Aşk Elinden Ağlayan
- Sar Leyla Leyla(ayrıldığı karısına yazmıştır)
- Hasta Düştüm
- Tor Şahin Misali
- Uyma Sakın

=== Albums ===
- 1957 – Neden Garip Garip Ötersin Bülbül
- 1960 – Gitme Leylam
- 1979 – Türküler Yolcu
- 1985 – Sazlı Oyun Havaları
- 1987 – Türkülerle Yaşayan Efsane Deyişler Bozlaklar Türküler
- 1988 – Gönül Ne Gezersin Seyran Yerinde
- 1988 – Kendim Ettim Kendim Buldum
- 1988 – Kibar Kız
- 1989 – Hapishanelere Güneş Doğmuyor
- 1989 – Sazlı Sözlü Oyun Havaları
- 1990 – Gel Gayri Gel
- 1992 – Şirin Kırşehir
- 1993 – Kova Kova İndirdiler Yazıya
- 1995 – Seçmeler 2
- 1995 – Seçmeler 3
- 1995 – Seher Vakti
- 1995 – Altın Ezgiler 3
- 1995 – Benim Yurdum
- 1997 – Nostalji 1
- 1998 – Ölmeyen Türküler 2
- 1999 – Ölmeyen Türküler 3
- 1998 – Gönül Yarası
- 1999 – Zahidem
- 2000 – Hata Benim
- 2000 – Agla Sazim
- 2000 – Sevsem Oldururler
- 2001 – Dostlara Selam
- 2001 – Sabreyle Gonul
- 2002 – Vay Vay Dunya
- 2003 – Yolcu
- 2007 – Acem Kiz
- 2008 – Neset Ertas
- 2009 – Neset Ertas Turkuleri 2
