= Governor of Kırşehir =

Governor of a Turkish Province

Governor of Kırşehir Kırşehir Valiliği
- Logo of the Governor of Kırşehir
- Incumbent; Murat Sefa Demiryürek since September 25, 2024
- Appointer: President of Turkey; On the recommendation of the Turkish government
- Term length: No set term length or limit
- Inaugural holder: İbrahim Nazım Bey; 1925
- Website: Office of the Governor

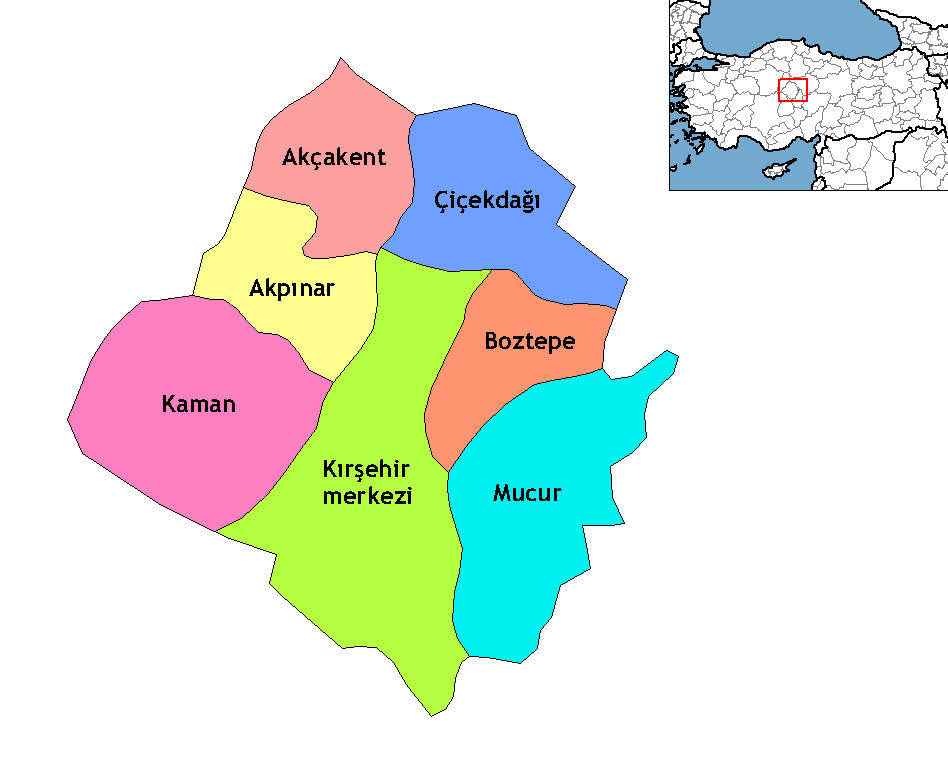
Map of the Province of Kırşehir, showing the provincial districts.

The Governor of Kırşehir (Turkish: Kırşehir Valiliği) is responsible for the implementation of government legislation within Kırşehir Province, Turkey. The governorship is a civil service office appointed by the government of Turkey. The Governor is also the most senior commander of both the Kırşehir provincial police force and the Kırşehir Gendarmerie.

== Appointment ==
The Governor of Kırşehir is appointed by the President of Turkey, who confirms the appointment after recommendation from the Turkish Government. The Ministry of the Interior first considers and puts forward possible candidates for approval by the cabinet. The Governor of Kırşehir is therefore not a directly elected position and instead functions as the most senior civil servant in the Province of Kırşehir.

=== Term limits ===
The Governor is not limited by any term limits and does not serve for a set length of time. Instead, the Governor serves at the pleasure of the Government, which can appoint or reposition the Governor whenever it sees fit. Such decisions are again made by the cabinet of Turkey. The Governor of Kırşehir, as a civil servant, may not have any close connections or prior experience in Kırşehir Province. It is not unusual for Governors to alternate between several different Provinces during their bureaucratic career.

== Functions ==
The Governor of Kırşehir has both bureaucratic functions and influence over local government. The main role of the Governor is to oversee the implementation of decisions by government ministries, constitutional requirements and legislation passed by Grand National Assembly within the provincial borders. The Governor also has the power to reassign, remove or appoint officials a certain number of public offices and has the right to alter the role of certain public institutions if they see fit. Governors are also the most senior public official within the Province, meaning that they preside over any public ceremonies or provincial celebrations being held due to a national holiday. As the commander of the provincial police and Gendarmerie forces, the Governor can also take decisions designed to limit civil disobedience and preserve public order. Although mayors of municipalities and councillors are elected during local elections, the Governor has the right to re-organise or to inspect the proceedings of local government despite being an unelected position.

== List of governors of Kırşehir ==
- İbrahim Hazım Mat (1925–1927)
- İsmail Sefa Apaydın (1927–1928)
- Nazım Bey (1928–1934)
- A. Mithat Saylam (1934–1939)
- Bekir Sami Baran (1939–1945)
- Mahmut Nedim Aker (1945–1946)
- Ömer Cevat Öymen (1946)
- Cavit Kınay (1946–1947)
- Ahmet Refik Noyan (1947–1948)
- Ahmet Tekelioğlu (1948–1950)
- Ziya Dönmez (1950–1951)
- Aydın Özakın (1951–1953)
- Rebii Karatekin (1953–1954)
- Turgut Eğilmez (1957–1958)
- Ahmet Tekelioğlu (1958–1960)
- Hakkı Nevzat Baykal (1960–1962)
- Fuat Kadıoğlu (1962–1964)
- Sedat Kirtetepe (1964–1966)
- Namık Sezgin (1966–1968)
- Tekin Alp (1968–1970)
- Ali Rıza Yaradanakul (1970–1971)
- Mustafa Kemal Demirtaş (1971–1975)
- Fevzi Baysan (1975–1978)
- Mehmet Aldan (1978–1979)
- Ertuğrul Süer (1979–1980)
- Fikret Turgut Sayın (1980–1984)
- Arif Atilla Osmançelebioğlu (1984–1986)
- Kamil Demircioğlu (1986–1988)
- Gökhan Sözer (1988–1991)
- Yılmaz Ergun (1991–1993)
- Mevlüt Çetinkaya (1993–1996)
- Salih Coşkun Şarman (1996–1997)
- Sabri Erbaş (1997–2003)
- Lütfullah Bilgin (2003–2007)
- Mehmet Ufuk Erden (2007–2012)
- Özdemir Çakacak (2012–2014)
- Necati Şentürk (2014–2018)
- İbrahim Akın (2018–2022)
- Hüdayar Mete Buhara (2022–2024)
- Murat Sefa Demiryürek (2024–)

== See also ==
- Governor (Turkey)
- Kırşehir Province
- Ministry of the Interior (Turkey)
