= Akpınar District =

District of Kırşehir Province, Turkey

- District
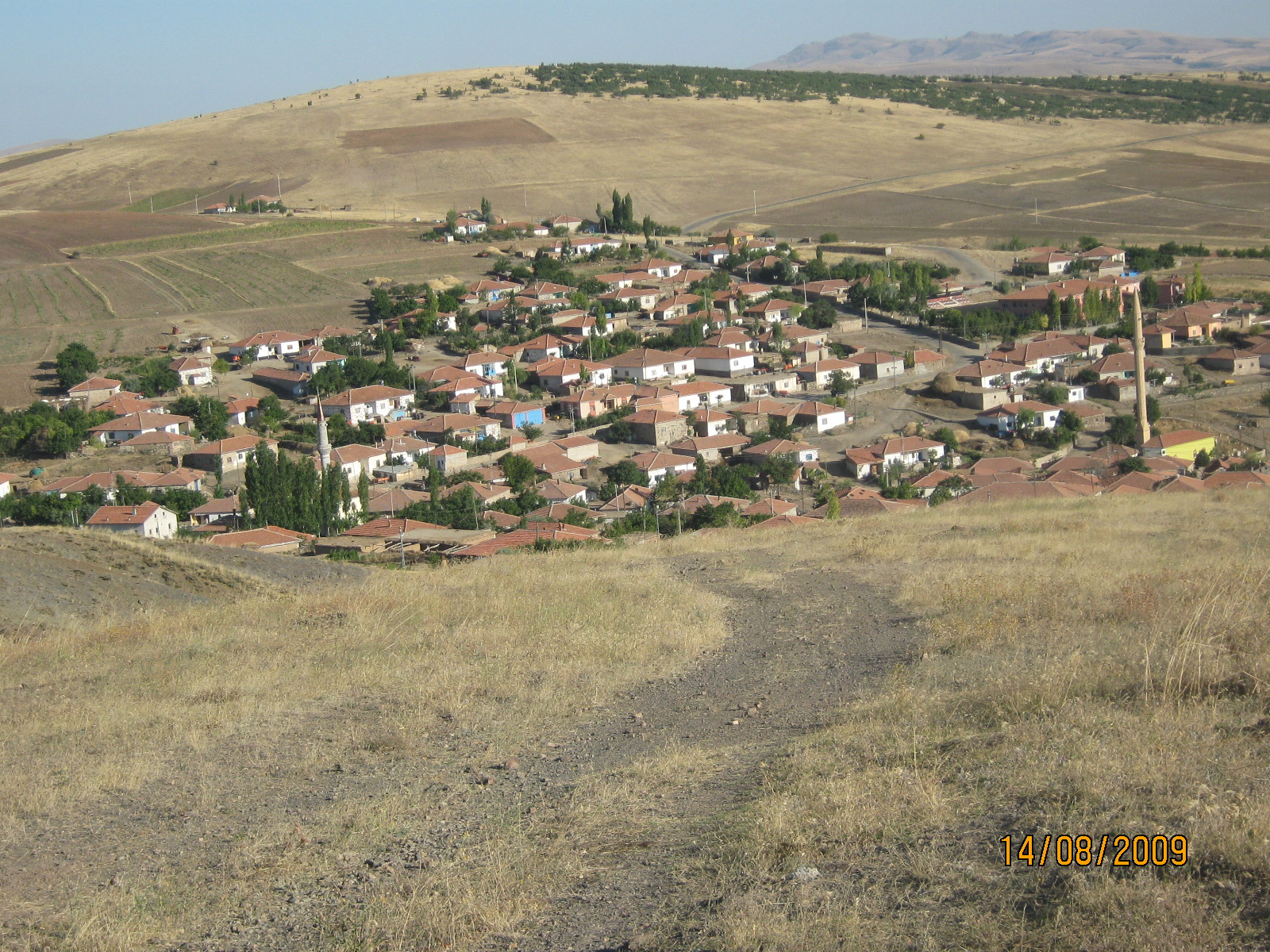
- Village of Büyükabdiuşağı

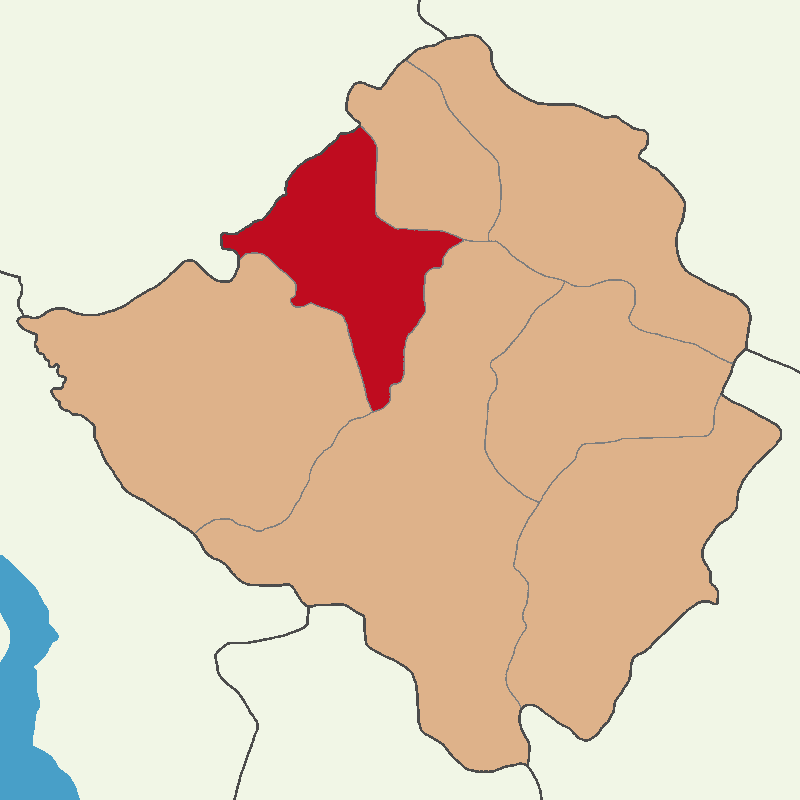
- Map showing Akpınar District in Kırşehir Province

- Location within Turkey Location within Turkey Central Anatolia
- Coordinates: 39°26′N 33°58′E
- Country: Turkey
- Province: Kırşehir
- Seat: Akpınar

Government
  - Kaymakam: Yunus Emre Polat
- Area: 582 km^{2} (225 sq mi)
- Population (2022): 6,893
  - Density: 11.8/km^{2} (30.7/sq mi)
- Time zone: UTC+3 (TRT)
- Website: www.akpinar.gov.tr

Akpınar District is a district of the Kırşehir Province of Turkey. Its seat is the town of Akpınar. Its area is 582 km^{2}, and its population is 6,893 (2022).

== Composition ==
There is one municipality in Akpınar District:

- Akpınar

There are 26 villages in Akpınar District:

- Alişar
- Aşağıhomurlu
- Boyalık
- Büyükabdiuşağı
- Çalıburnu
- Çayözü
- Çebişler
- Çelebiuşağı
- Çiftlikmehmetağa
- Çiftliksarıkaya
- Demirci
- Deveci
- Durmuşlu
- Eldeleklidemirel
- Eldelekliortaoba
- Eşrefli
- Gülveren
- Hacımirza
- Hacıselimli
- Hanyerisarıkaya
- Himmetuşağı
- Karaova
- Kelismailuşağı
- Köşker
- Pekmezci
- Sofrazlı
