= Köseli, Çiçekdağı =

Köseli
- Municipality
- Location in Turkey Köseli (Turkey Central Anatolia)
- Coordinates: 39°39′19″N 34°27′31″E
- Country: Turkey
- Province: Kırşehir
- District: Çiçekdağı
- Population (2022): 2,313
- Time zone: UTC+3 (TRT)

Köseli is a town (belde) in the Çiçekdağı District, Kırşehir Province, Turkey. Its population is 2,313 (2022). It lies adjacent to the north of Yerköy in Yozgat Province.
