= Çiçekdağı District =

District of Kırşehir Province, Turkey

- District
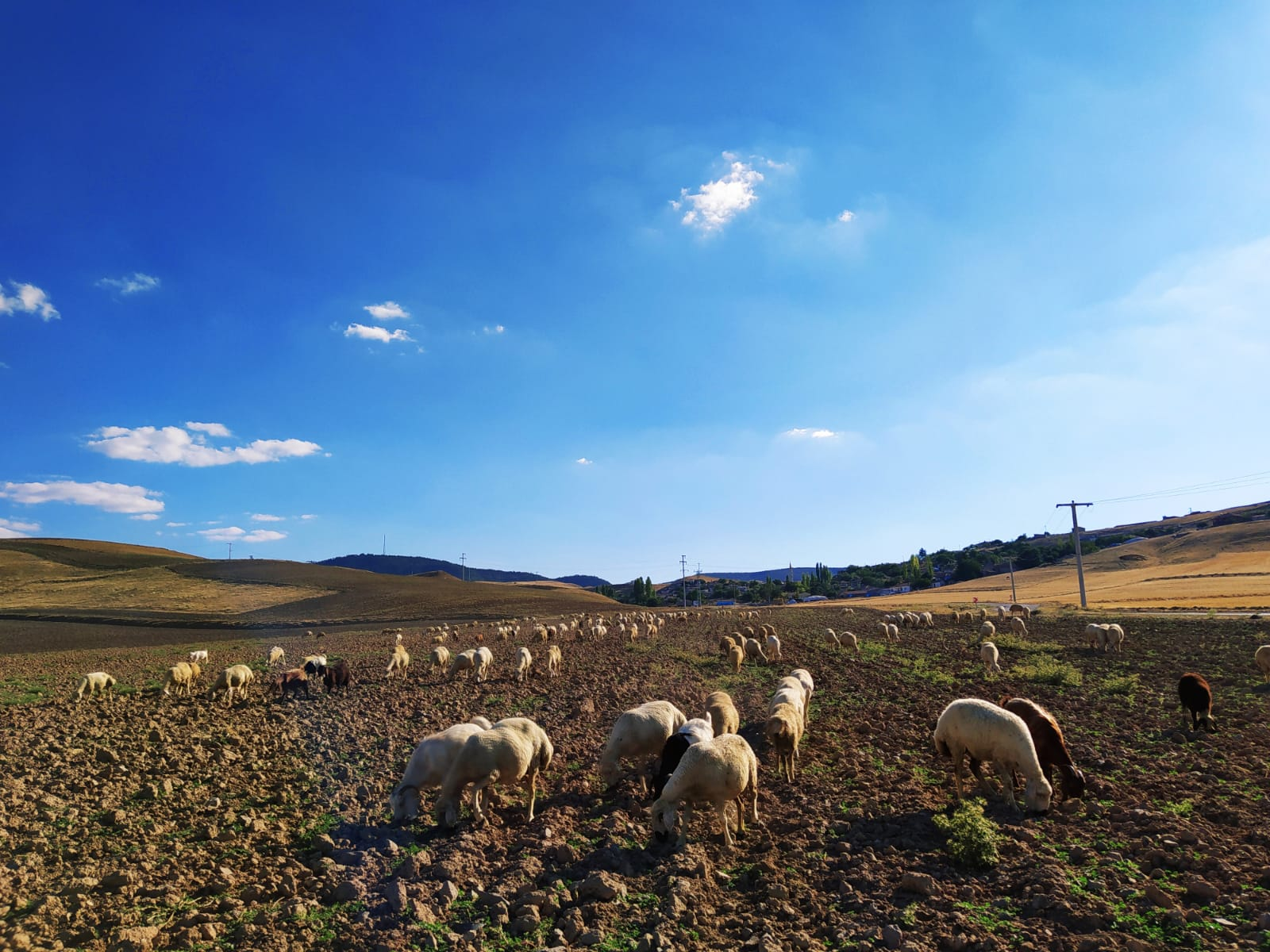
- Harmanpınar countryside, Çiçekdağı

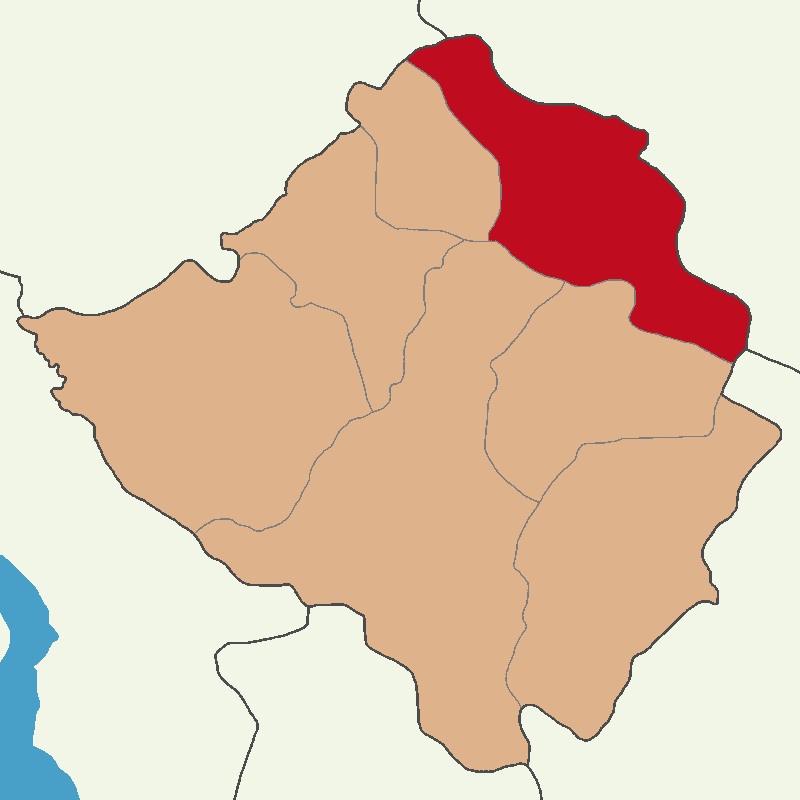
- Map showing Çiçekdağı District in Kırşehir Province

- Location within Turkey Location within Turkey Central Anatolia
- Coordinates: 39°36′N 34°24′E
- Country: Turkey
- Province: Kırşehir
- Seat: Çiçekdağı

Government
  - Kaymakam: Rabia Naçar Çanakcıoğlu
- Area: 891 km^{2} (344 sq mi)
- Population (2022): 13,529
  - Density: 15.2/km^{2} (39.3/sq mi)
- Time zone: UTC+3 (TRT)
- Website: www.cicekdagi.gov.tr

Çiçekdağı District is a district of the Kırşehir Province of Turkey. Its seat is the town of Çiçekdağı. Its area is 891 km^{2}, and its population is 13,529 (2022).

== Composition ==
There are two municipalities in Çiçekdağı District:

- Çiçekdağı
- Köseli

There are 45 villages in Çiçekdağı District:

- Acıköy
- Akbıyıklı
- Alahacılı
- Alanköy
- Alimpınar
- Armutlu
- Aşağıhacıahmetli
- Bahçepınar
- Baraklı
- Beşikli
- Boğazevci
- Bozlar
- Büyükteflek
- Çanakpınar
- Çepni
- Çiçekli
- Çopraşık
- Çubuktarla
- Demirli
- Doğankaş
- Gölcük
- Hacıduraklı
- Hacıhasanlı
- Hacıoğlu
- Halaçlı
- Harmanpınar
- Haydarlı
- İbikli
- Kabaklı
- Kaleevci
- Kavaklıöz
- Kırdök
- Kızılcalı
- Konurkale
- Küçükteflek
- Mahmutlu
- Ortahacıahmetli
- Pöhrenk
- Safalı
- Şahinoğlu
- Tatbekirli
- Tepecik
- Topalali
- Yalnızağaç
- Yukarıhacıahmetli
