= Çayağzı, Kırşehir =

Çayağzı
- Village
- Location within Turkey Location within Turkey Central Anatolia
- Coordinates: 39°16′46″N 34°4′31″E
- Country: Turkey
- Province: Kırşehir
- District: Kırşehir
- Population (2022): 913
- Time zone: UTC+3 (TRT)

Çayağzı (formerly: Cemele) is a village in the Kırşehir District of Kırşehir Province, Turkey. Its population is 913 (2022). Before the 2013 reorganisation, it was a town (belde).

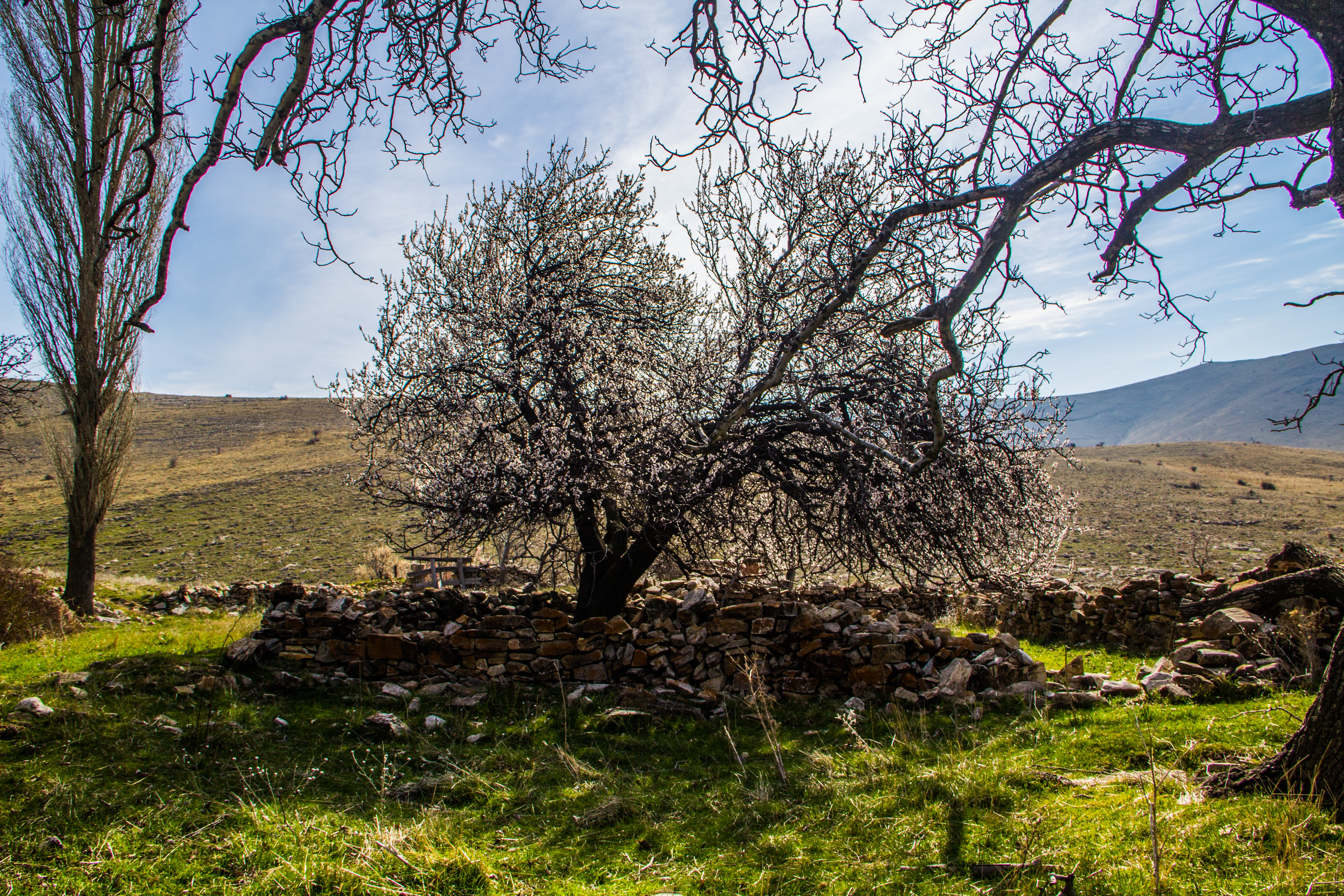
Çayağzı countryside
