= Kaman District =

District of Kırşehir Province, Turkey

- District
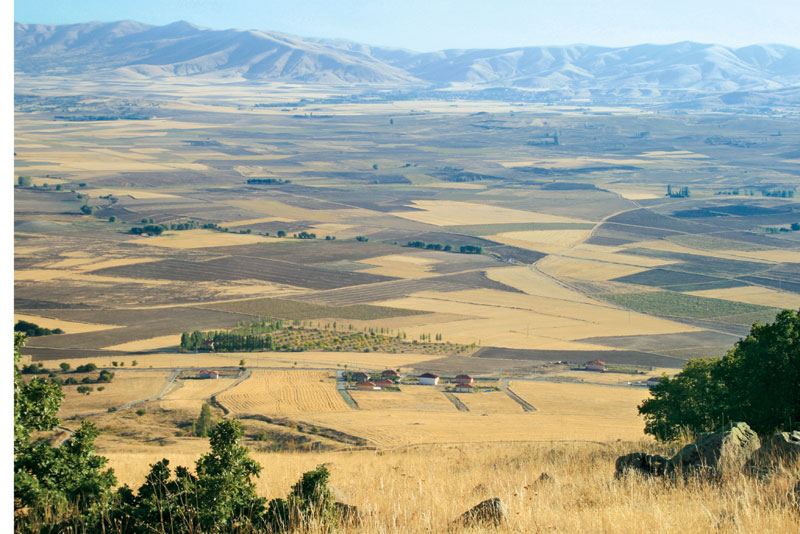
- İsahocalı countryside, Kaman

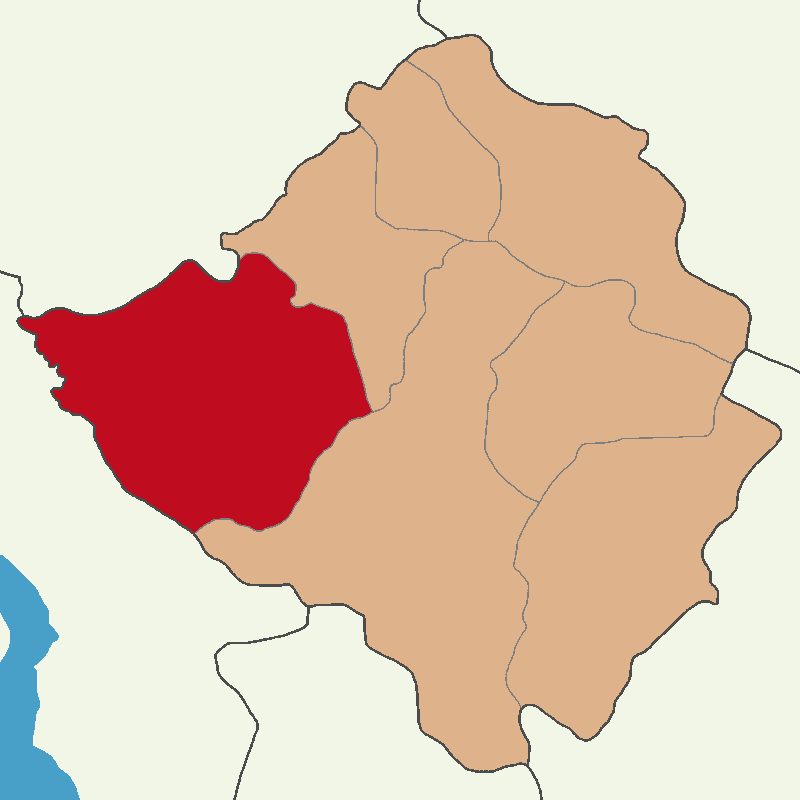
- Map showing Kaman District in Kırşehir Province

- Location within Turkey Location within Turkey Central Anatolia
- Coordinates: 39°21′N 33°43′E
- Country: Turkey
- Province: Kırşehir
- Seat: Kaman

Government
  - Kaymakam: Rabia Naçar Çanakcıoğlu
- Area: 1,284 km^{2} (496 sq mi)
- Population (2022): 34,129
  - Density: 26.58/km^{2} (68.84/sq mi)
- Time zone: UTC+3 (TRT)
- Website: www.kaman.gov.tr

Kaman District is a district of the Kırşehir Province of Turkey. Its seat is the town of Kaman. Its area is 1,284 km^{2}, and its population is 34,129 (2022).

== Composition ==
There are two municipalities in Kaman District:

- Kaman
- Kurancılı

There are 50 villages in Kaman District:

- Ağapınar
- Aydınlar
- Başköy
- Bayındır
- Bayramözü
- Benzer
- Büğüz
- Çadırlı Hacıbayram
- Çadırlı Körmehmet
- Çağırkan
- Darıözü
- Değirmenözü
- Demirli
- Esentepe
- Fakılı
- Gökeşme
- Gültepe
- Hamit
- Hirfanlar
- İbrişim
- İkizler
- İmancı
- İsahocalı
- Kaleköy
- Karahabalı
- Karakaya
- Kargınkızıközü
- Kargınmeşe
- Kargınselimağa
- Kargınyenice
- Kekilliali
- Meşeköy
- Mollaosmanlar
- Ömerhacılı
- Ömerkahya
- Sarıömerli
- Savcılıbağbaşı
- Savcılıbüyükoba
- Savcılıebeyit
- Savcılıkışla
- Savcılıkurutlu
- Savcılımeryemkaşı
- Tatık
- Tepeköy
- Yağmurlusarıuşağı
- Yazıyolu
- Yelek
- Yeniköy
- Yeniyapan
- Yukarıçiftlikköyü
