= Muharrem Ertaş =

- Born: 1913; Kırşehir Province, Ankara Vilayet, Ottoman Empire
- Died: 3 December 1984 (aged 70–71) Kırşehir, Turkey
- Genres: Turkish folk music
- Occupations: Singer, player
- Instrument: Bağlama

Muharrem Ertaş (1913 – 3 December 1984) was a Turkish folk music singer and a virtuoso of the traditional Turkish instrument bağlama. He was one of the most important members of the Bozlak genre.

== Early life ==
He was born in 1913 in the village of Yağmurlubüyükoba in Ankara Vilayet (present-day Kırşehir Province) as one of five children to Kara Ahmed, a Zurna player, and his wife Ayşe. It is told that his ancestors, members of a cameleer tribe, immigrated from Khorasan to settle in Kırşehir's countryside.

He learned playing bağlama at the age of seven and eight from his uncle Bulduk. However, his real master was his other uncle Yusuf, one of the saz virtuosi in the region. He taught Muharrem mostly the poems of the folk poet Aşık Sait (1835–1910) in addition to the anonym melodies of the region. Muharrem accompanied his uncle by his tours in neighboring villages to make music at wedding parties, circumcision ceremonies and bayrams. After seven years of togetherness with his uncle Yusuf Usta, he started to play and sing alone.

He was married to Hatice, who died early. Muharrem later married again. His second wife Döne bore him two sons Necati, Neşet and two daughters Ayşe and Nadiye. His second wife also died soon. He then married Arzu, whom he met during a wedding ceremony in a village of Yozgat Province. From his last marriage, four sons Ekrem, Ali, Muharrem and Cemal, were born. From then on, he had a very hard life to earn money for a family with eight children.

== Music career ==
Muharrem Ertaş had a wide repertoire of the traditional folk music specific to Central Anatolia. In addition to Bozlak, he played and sang examples of the halay genre and vocalized the phrases of folk poets and ashiks Karacaoğlan, Sheikh Galip, Pir Sultan Abdal and Dadaloğlu. He sang sometimes also türküs of religious themes.

He instructed his son Neşet Ertaş (1938–2012) in bağlama playing, who became later one of the greatest poets of Turkish folk literature and a bağlama virtuoso. From the 1970s on, Muharrem Ertaş became better known as the "father of Neşet Ertaş", who reached fame. Neşet was epoch-making in the genre of Turkish folk music.

== Death ==
He died silently on 3 December 1984 at the age of 71 in a poor housing in the slum neighborhood Bağbaşı of Kırşehir. His whole life can be expressed in two words: He "played and sang".

== Legacy ==
The city of Kırşehir erected a statue of him in 1990 in the city center. In 2002, another statue was built in Kırşehir depicting him and his son Neşet.
