= Özbağ =

- Municipality
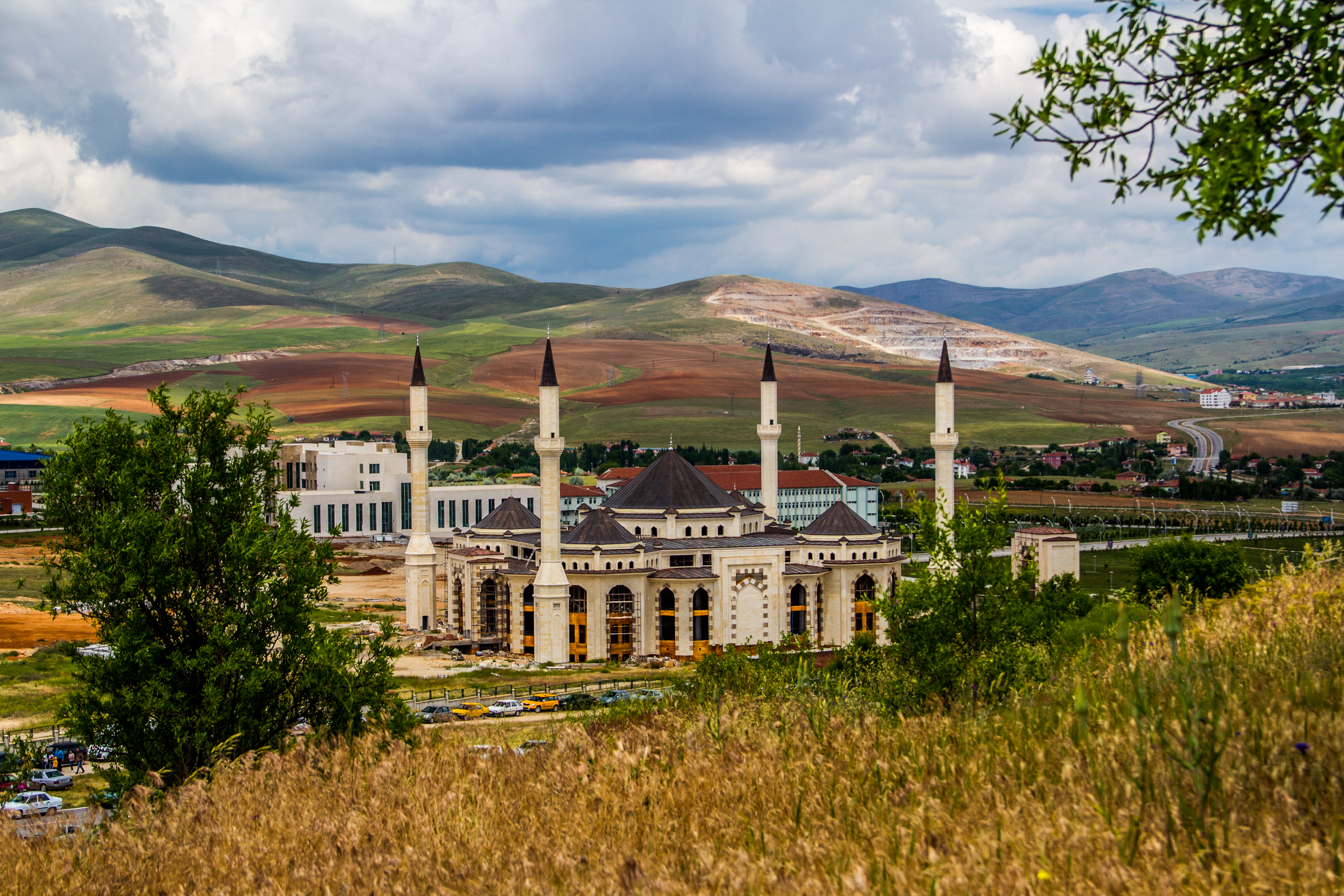
- Özbağ

- Location within Turkey Location within Turkey Central Anatolia
- Coordinates: 39°12′54″N 34°08′33″E
- Country: Turkey
- Province: Kırşehir
- District: Kırşehir
- Population (2022): 3,519
- Time zone: UTC+3 (TRT)

Özbağ is a town (belde) in the Kırşehir District, Kırşehir Province, Turkey. Its population is 3,519 (2022).
