= Akpınar, Kırşehir =

Akpınar
- Municipality
- Location in Turkey Akpınar (Turkey Central Anatolia)
- Coordinates: 39°26′50″N 33°58′05″E
- Country: Turkey
- Province: Kırşehir
- District: Akpınar

Government
  - Mayor: Şükrü Turgut (CHP)
- Elevation: 1,120 m (3,670 ft)
- Population (2022): 2,742
- Time zone: UTC+3 (TRT)
- Postal code: 40320
- Area code: 0386

Akpınar is a town in Kırşehir Province in the Central Anatolia region of Turkey. It is the seat of Akpınar District. Its population is 2,742 (2022).

== History ==
According to the article by Abdulbaki Uçan, "İkiztepe Tümülüsü ve Hitit aydınlığı" Akpınar was founded by the primitive clans of the pre-Hittites. In the environs of Akpınar some artificial mounds support Uçan's assumption. He conducted a surface search in 2011 (Tekhöyük) and after that published an article on the surface ruins of Tekhöyük and İkiztepe Tumulus. In 1986 Tsugio Mikami and Sachihiro Omura were in the vicinity of Akpınar under the aegis of the Japan Middle Eastern Culture Center and found some ruins of the Iron Age and Bronze Age in the surface levels at Akpınar Höyük. Nevertheless there is no comprehensive research about the ancient history of Akpınar except for Uçan's article.
