= Mucur District =

District of Kırşehir Province, Turkey

- District
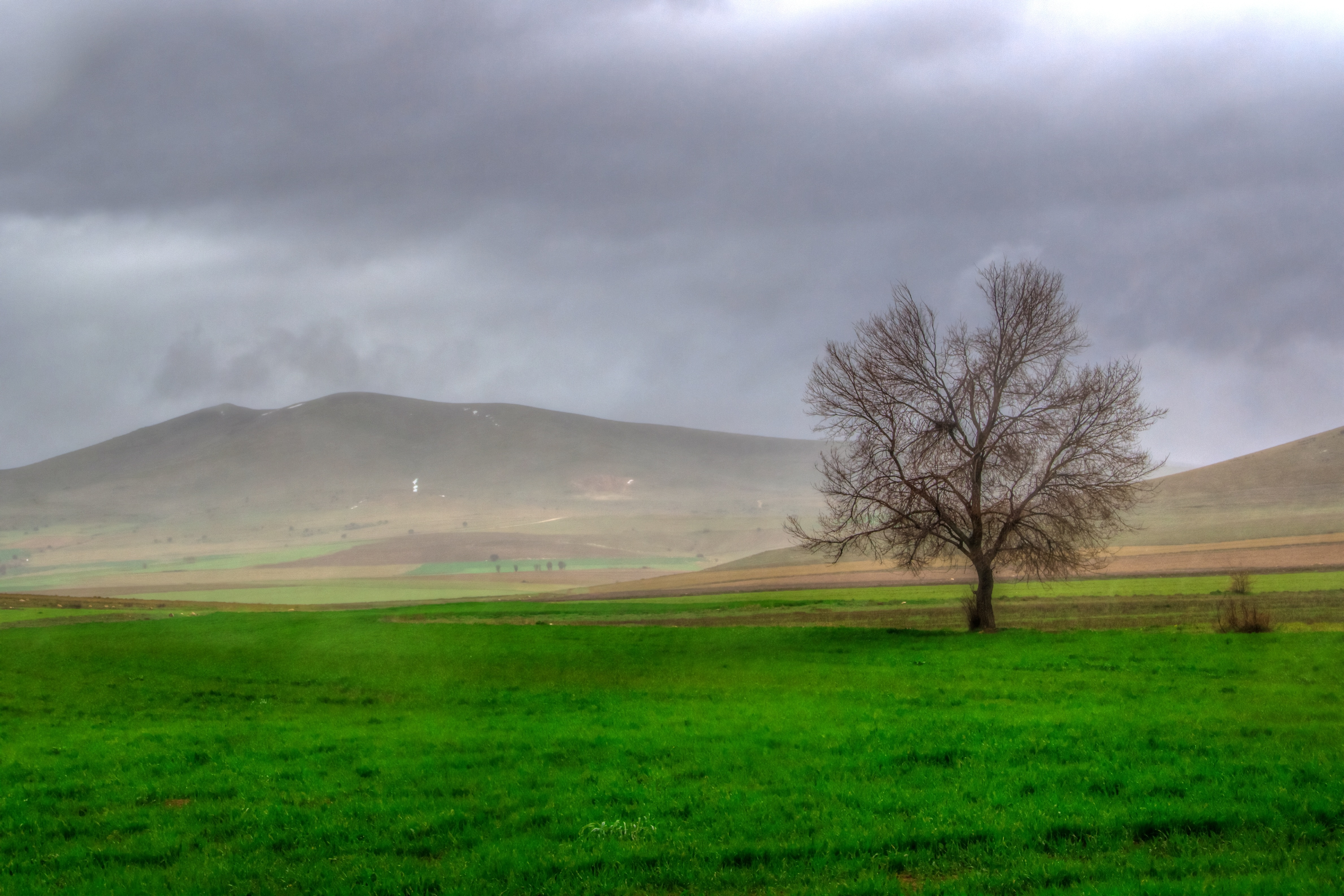
- Gümüşkümbet countryside, Mucur

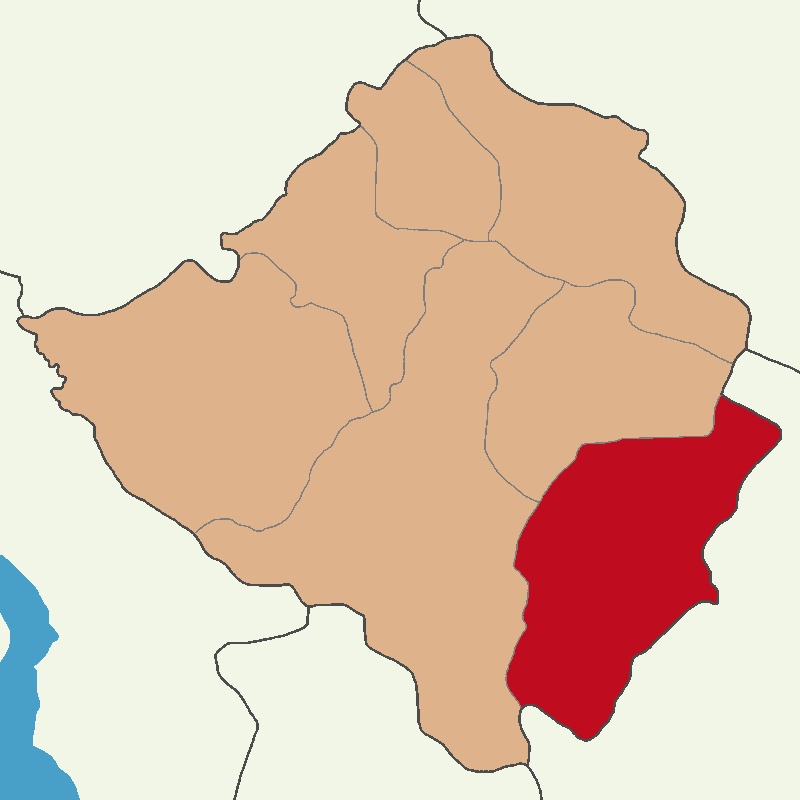
- Map showing Mucur District in Kırşehir Province

- Location within Turkey Location within Turkey Central Anatolia
- Coordinates: 39°04′N 34°23′E
- Country: Turkey
- Province: Kırşehir
- Seat: Mucur

Government
  - Kaymakam: Osman Şahin
- Area: 992 km^{2} (383 sq mi)
- Population (2022): 18,211
  - Density: 18.4/km^{2} (47.5/sq mi)
- Time zone: UTC+3 (TRT)
- Website: www.mucur.gov.tr

Mucur District is a district of the Kırşehir Province of Turkey. Its seat is the town of Mucur. Its area is 992 km^{2}, and its population is 18,211 (2022).

== Composition ==
There is one municipality in Mucur District:

- Mucur

There are 44 villages in Mucur District:

- Aksaklı
- Altınyazı
- Asmakaradam
- Avcıköy
- Aydoğmuş
- Babur
- Bayramuşağı
- Bazlamaç
- Budak
- Büyükkayapa
- Çatalarkaç
- Dağçiftliğiköyü
- Dalakçı
- Devepınarı
- Geyicek
- Gümüşkümbet
- Güzyurdu
- İnaç
- Karaarkaç
- Karacalı
- Karakuyu
- Karkın
- Kepez
- Kılıçlı
- Kıran
- Kızılağıl
- Kızıldağyeniyapan
- Küçükburunağıl
- Küçükkavak
- Küçükkayapa
- Kurugöl
- Kuşaklı
- Medetsiz
- Obruk
- Palangıç
- Pınarkaya
- Rahmalar
- Seyfe
- Susuz
- Yazıkınık
- Yeğenağa
- Yeniköy
- Yeşilyurt
- Yürücek
