= Boztepe, Kırşehir =

Boztepe
- Municipality
- Location in Turkey Boztepe (Turkey Central Anatolia)
- Coordinates: 39°16′11″N 34°15′40″E
- Country: Turkey
- Province: Kırşehir
- District: Boztepe

Government
  - Mayor: Musa Ceylan (MHP)
- Elevation: 1,120 m (3,670 ft)
- Population (2022): 2,680
- Time zone: UTC+3 (TRT)
- Area code: 0386
- Website: www.boztepe.bel.tr

Boztepe is a town in Kırşehir Province in the Central Anatolia region of Turkey. It is the seat of Boztepe District. Its population is 2,680 (2022).
