= Çoğun Dam =

Coordinates: 39.3245°N 34.1166°E

- Interactive map of Çoğun Dam
- Location: Turkey

Çoğun Dam is a dam with reservoir lake in Kırşehir, Turkey. It was built and put into operation between 1963 and 1975 for flood control and irrigation.

The development was backed by the Turkish State Hydraulic Works.

== See also ==
- List of dams and reservoirs in Turkey
