= Mucur =

- Municipality
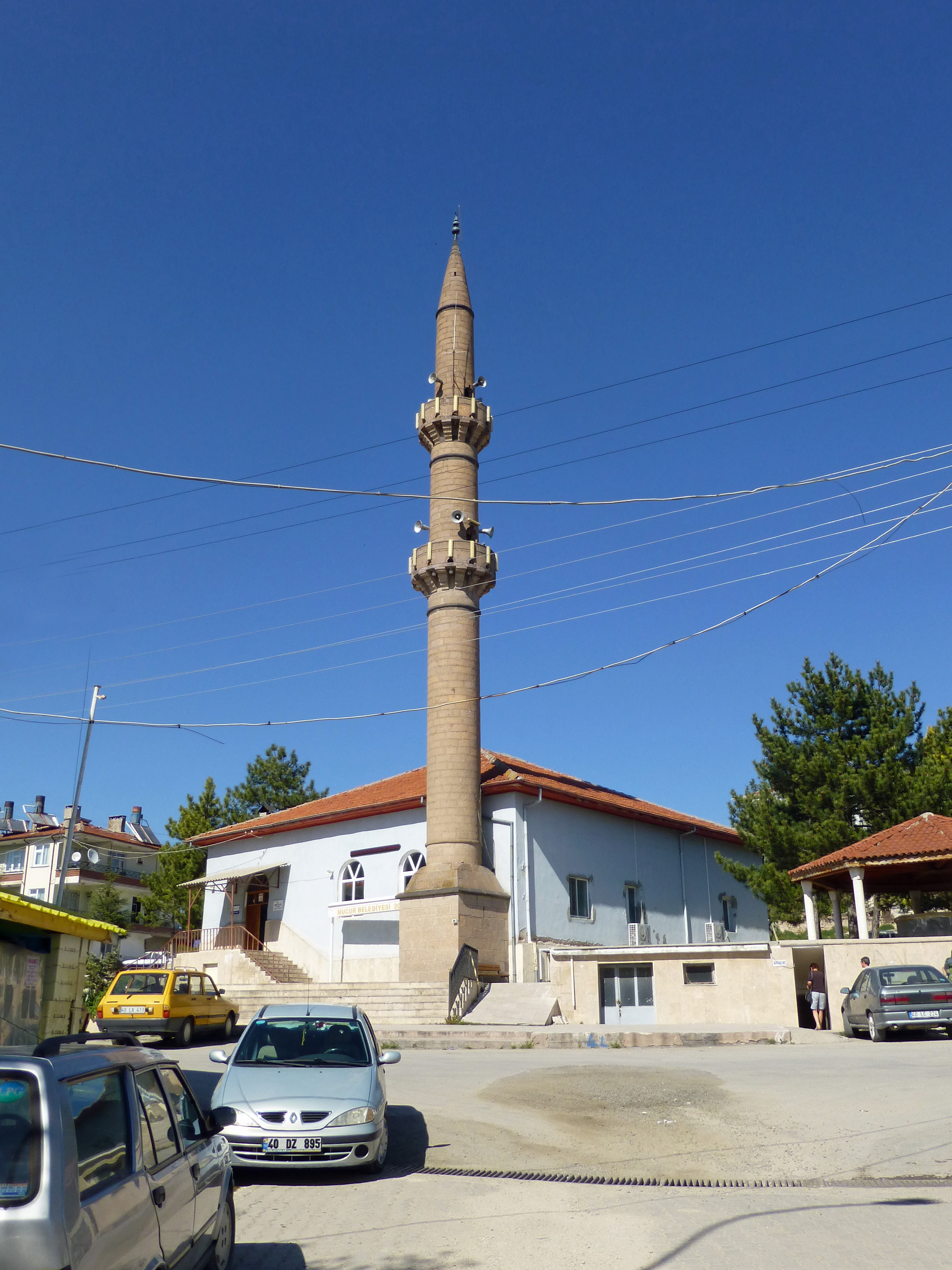
- mosque in Mucur

- Location within Turkey Location within Turkey Central Anatolia
- Coordinates: 39°03′49″N 34°22′42″E
- Country: Turkey
- Province: Kırşehir
- District: Mucur

Government
  - Mayor: Ali ŞAHİN (BBP)
- Elevation: 1,120 m (3,670 ft)
- Population (2022): 13,350
- Time zone: UTC+3 (TRT)
- Postal code: 40500
- Area code: 0386
- Website: www.mucur.bel.tr

Mucur, formerly known as Niza, is a town in Kırşehir Province in the Central Anatolia region of Turkey. It is the seat of Mucur District. Its population is 13,350 (2022). It is known as a center for the production and sale of prayer rugs and other decorative rugs. Its elevation is 1,120 m (3,670 ft).

== History ==
From 1867 until 1922, Mucur was part of Angora vilayet.
