= Kırşehir Province =

Province of Turkey

Kırşehir Province Kırşehir ili
- Province
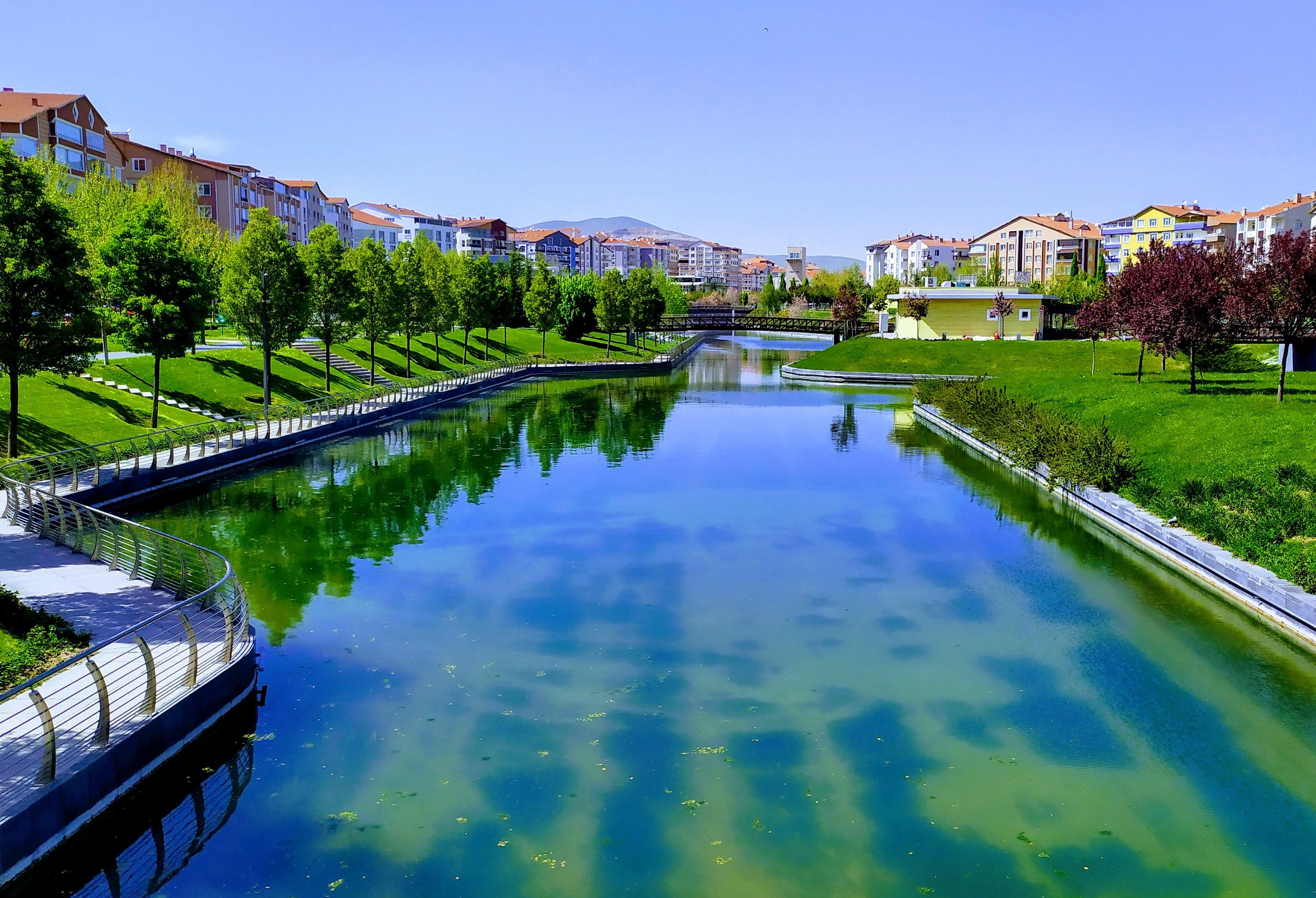
- Kentpark in Kırşehir

- Location of the province within Turkey
- Country: Turkey
- Seat: Kırşehir

Government
  - Governor: Murat Sefa Demiryürek
- Area: 6,584 km^{2} (2,542 sq mi)
- Population (2022): 244,519
  - Density: 37.14/km^{2} (96.19/sq mi)
- Time zone: UTC+3 (TRT)
- Area code: 0386
- Website: www.kirsehir.gov.tr

Kırşehir Province (Turkish: Kırşehir ili) is a province in central Turkey, forming part of the Central Anatolia Region. Its area is 6,584 km^{2}, and its population is 244,519 (2022). The average elevation is approximately 985 meters above sea level. The provincial capital is Kırşehir. The geographical centre of all land surfaces on Earth is at 39°00′N 34°00′E, in Kırşehir Province, Turkey.

== History ==
Kırşehir Province was originally established in 1924. On 30 June 1954, the province of Kırşehir was dissolved and its territory was divided between the provinces of Nevşehir, Ankara and Yozgat. This was decided by the ruling Democrat Party government of Prime Minister Adnan Menderes, because the majority of the city's residents had voted for the Republican Nation Party led by opposition politician Osman Bölükbaşı in the 1954 Turkish general election on 2 May 1954. Three years later, on 1 July 1957, Kırşehir Province was re-established.

== Demographics ==
The provincial center Kırşehir is the 69th largest city by population in Turkey; its surface area corresponds to 0.84% of Turkey's land area, which makes it the 53rd largest city in the country by land area.

== Districts ==
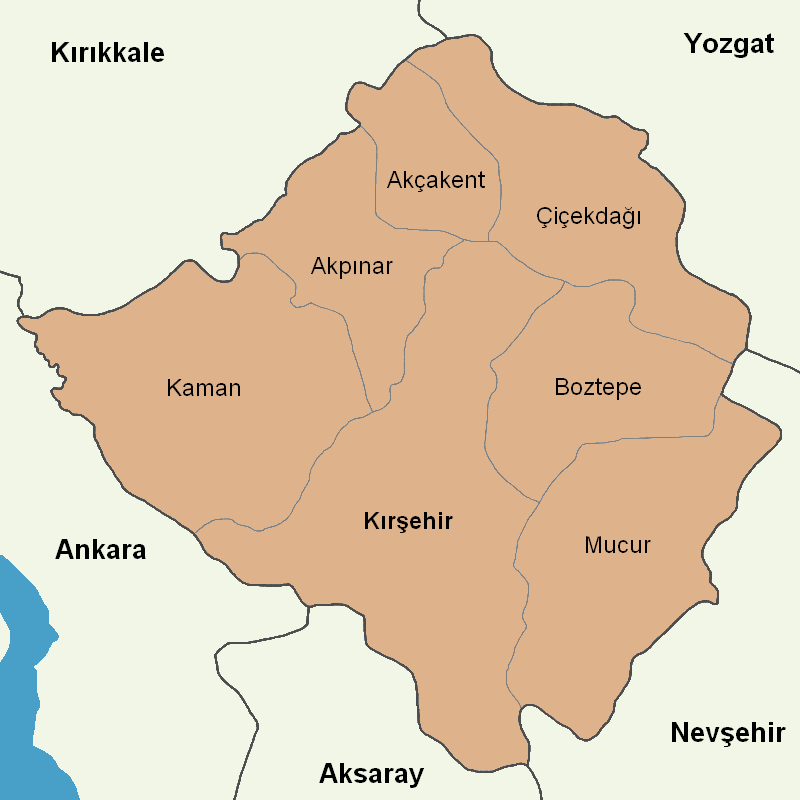
Districts of Kırşehir Province

Kırşehir province is divided into 7 districts (the capital district is in bold):

- Akçakent
- Akpınar
- Boztepe
- Çiçekdağı
- Kaman
- **Kırşehir**
- Mucur

== Places of Interest ==
- Üçayak Byzantine Church
- Cacabey Madrasa
- Kırşehir Museum

== Gallery ==
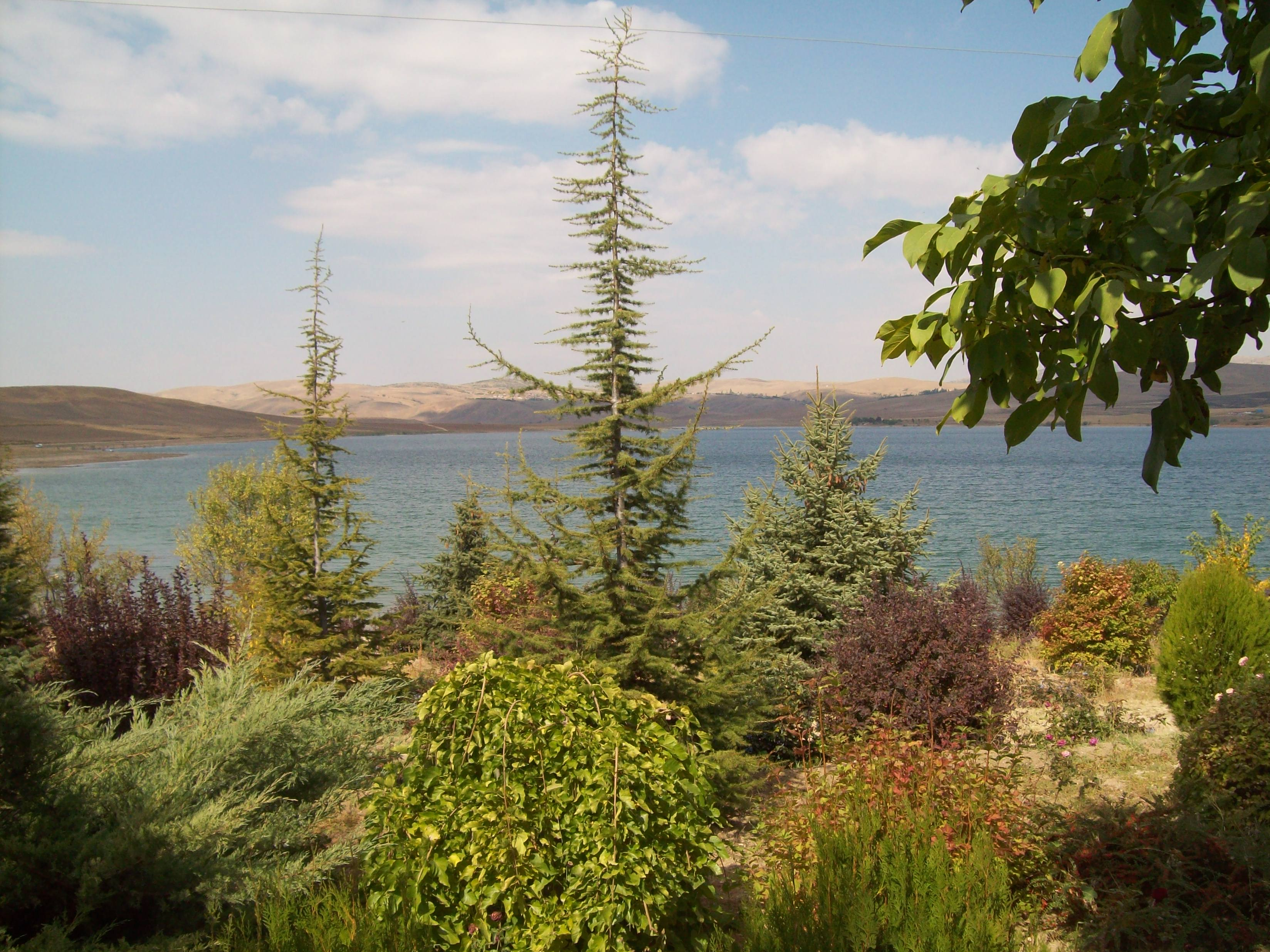
View of Lake Çoğun

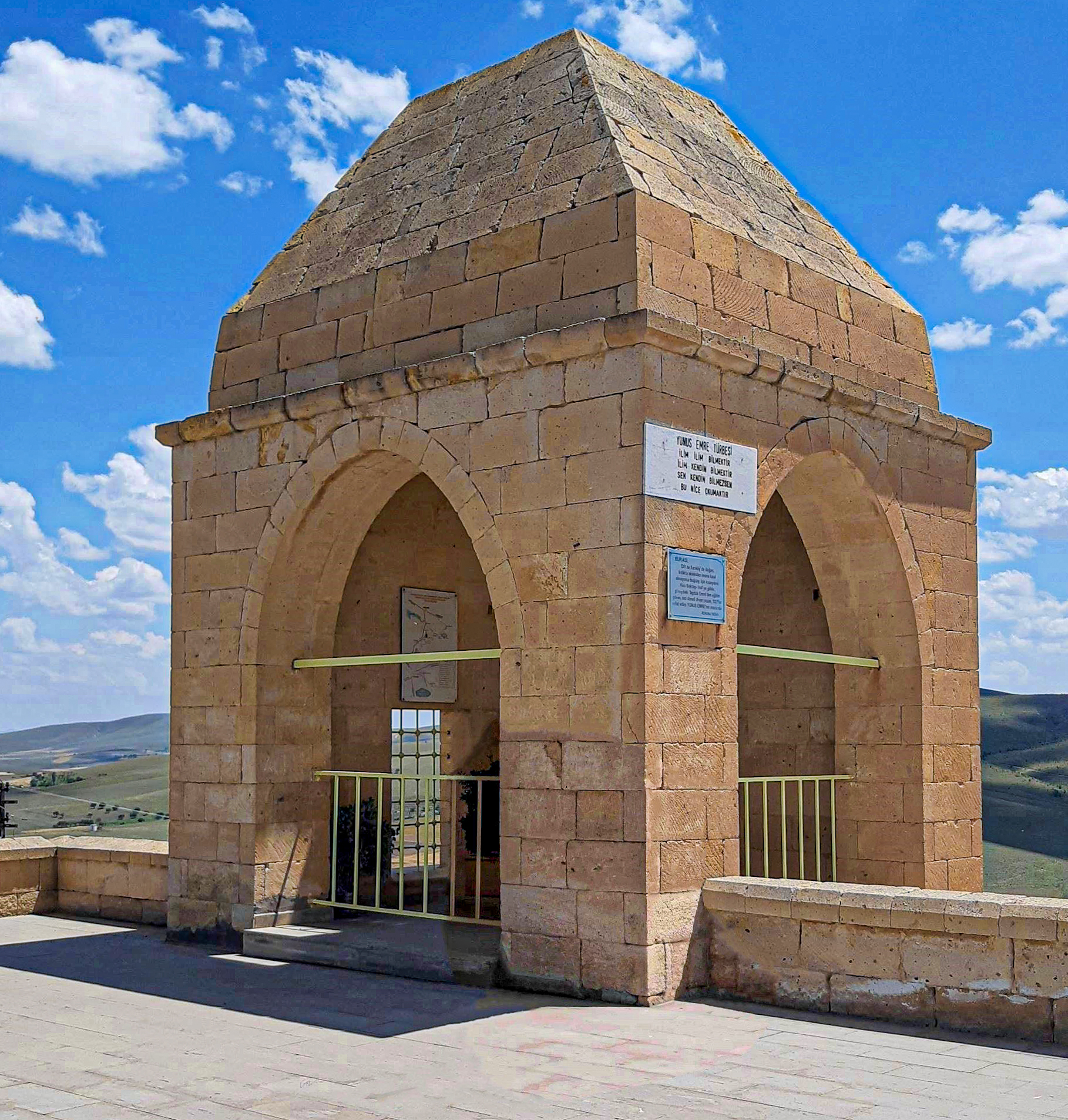
Türbe of Yunus Emre in Ulupınar

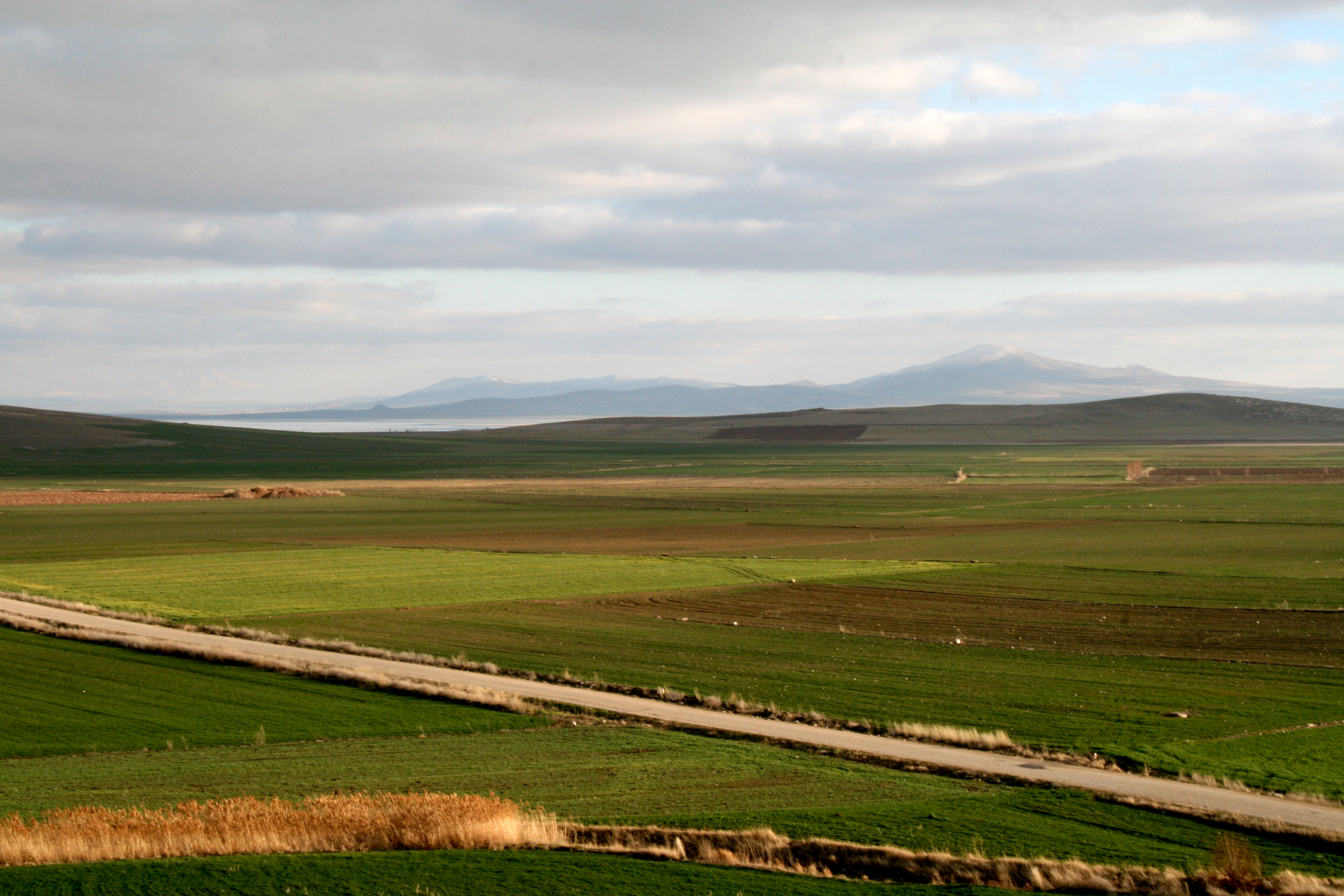
The fields of Boztepe in Kırşehir Province

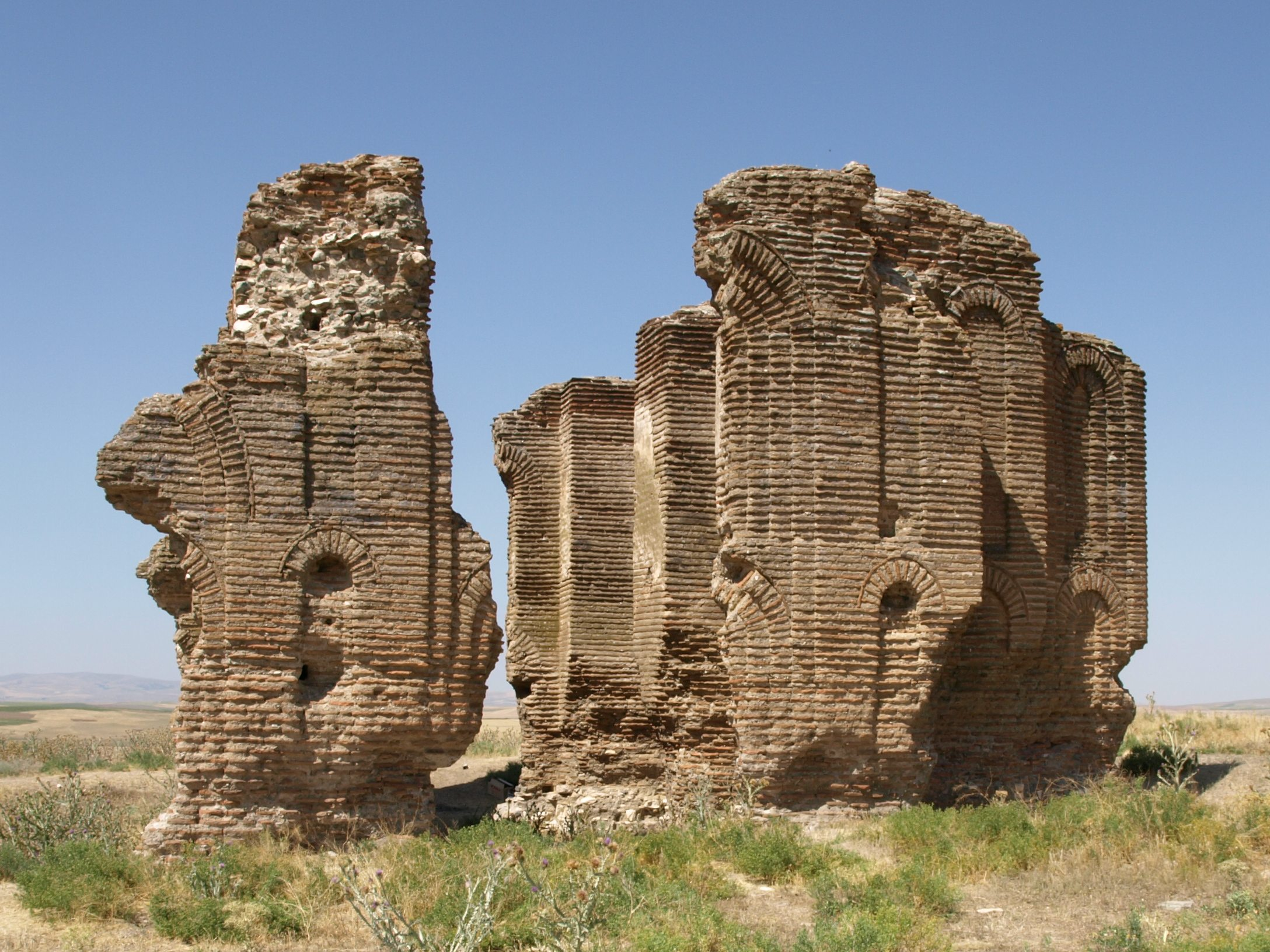
The ruins of the Üçayak Byzantine Church

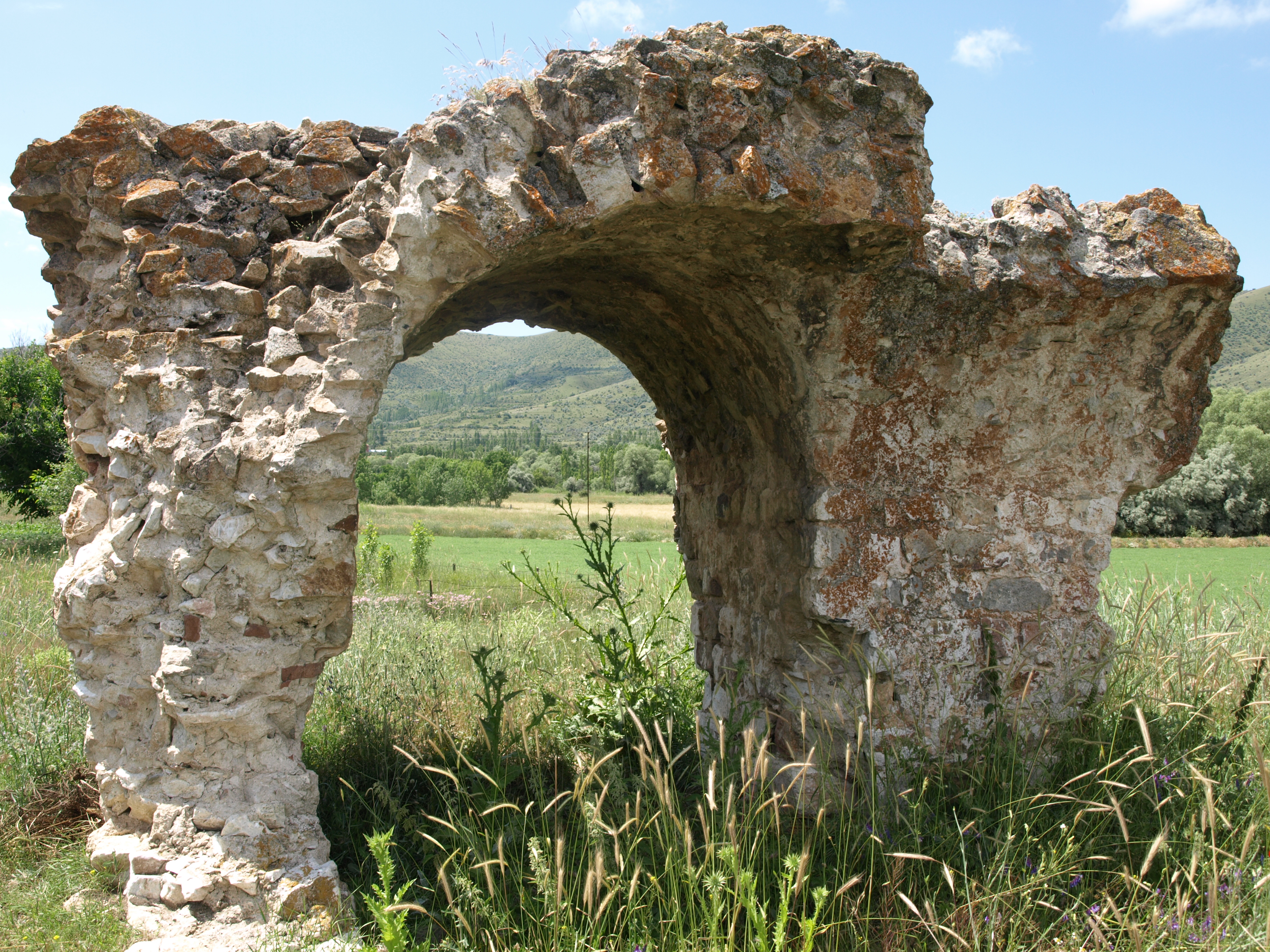
The remains of a church in Demirli, Kaman.

== See also ==
- List of populated places in Kırşehir Province
