= Yeniköy =

Yeniköy ('New Village' in Turkish, written يڭى كوى in Ottoman Turkish), sometimes written as two words Yeni Köy, may refer to one of the following places:

== In Turkey ==
- Yeniköy, Istanbul, a neighborhood in Sarıyer district of Istanbul, Turkey
  - Yeniköy Synagogue, a synagogue in the neighborhood
- Yeniköy, Adıyaman
- Yeniköy, Alaca
- Yeniköy, Alanya
- Yeniköy, Aydın
- Yeniköy (Dalama), Aydın
- Yeniköy, Babadağ
- Yeniköy, Bala
- Yeniköy, Bartın
- Yeniköy, Batman
- Yeniköy, Bayat
- Yeniköy, Bayburt
- Yeniköy, Bayramiç
- Yeniköy, Besni
- Yeniköy, Bigadiç
- Yeniköy, Bilecik
- Yeniköy, Bolu
- Yeniköy, Bozdoğan
- Yeniköy, Bursa
- Yeniköy, Çerkeş
- Yeniköy, Çilimli
- Yeniköy, Çine
- Yeniköy, Çüngüş
- Yeniköy, Dodurga
- Yeniköy, Emirdağ
- Yeniköy, Ergani
- Yeniköy, Erzincan
- Yeniköy, Ezine
- Yeniköy, Gazipaşa
- Yeniköy, Gelibolu
- Yeniköy, Gölbaşı
- Yeniköy, Göle
- Yeniköy, Göynücek
- Yeniköy, Göynük
- Yeniköy, Gündoğmuş
- Yeniköy, Hamamözü
- Yeniköy, Haymana
- Yeniköy, Hınıs
- Yeniköy, Kale
- Yeniköy, Karacasu
- Yeniköy, Karakoçan
- Yeniköy, Karayazı
- Yeniköy, Kaş
- Yeniköy, Koçarlı
- Yeniköy, Kovancılar
- Yeniköy, Kozan
- Yeniköy, Kurucaşile
- Yeniköy, Kuşadası
- Yeniköy, Manavgat
- Yeniköy, Manyas
- Yeniköy, Mersin
- Yeniköy, Ödemiş
- Yeniköy, Otlukbeli
- Yeniköy, Pasinler
- Yeniköy, Posof
- Yeniköy, Refahiye
- Yeniköy, Saimbeyli
- Yeniköy, Şanlıurfa
- Yeniköy, Sarıkamış
- Yeniköy, Sason
- Yeniköy, Silvan
- Yeniköy, Söke
- Yeniköy, Tarsus
- Yeniköy, Ulus
- Yeniköy, Yenice
- Yeniköy, Yenişehir
- Yeniköy, Yumurtalık
- Yeniköy, Yüreğir
- Yeniköy, Yusufeli

== Formerly named Yeniköy ==
=== Greece ===
- Stavroupoli, Xanthi, Greece
- Plevroma, Pella, Greece
- Eleftherochori, Kilkis
- Argillos, Kozani
- Provatas, Serres, Greece

=== North Macedonia ===
- Novo Selo Municipality
