= Çiftlikköy (disambiguation) =

Çiftlikköy can refer to the following places in Turkey:

- Çiftlikköy, a town in Yalova Province
- Çiftlikköy, Acıpayam, a neighbourhood in Denizli Province
- Çiftlikköy, Artuklu, a neighbourhood in Mardin Province
- Çiftlikköy, Bayramiç, a village in Çanakkale Province
- Çiftlikköy, Dodurga, a village in Çorum Province
- Çiftlikköy, Düzce, a village in Düzce Province
- Çiftlikköy, Eldivan, a village in Çankırı Province
- Çiftlikköy, İliç, a village in Erzincan Province
- Çiftlikköy, İnegöl, a neighbourhood in Bursa Province
- Çiftlikköy or Çiftlik, Kovancılar, a village in Elazığ Province
- Çiftlikköy, Sungurlu, a village in Çorum Province
- Çiftlikköy, Tavas, a neighbourhood in Denizli Province
- Çiftlikköy, Uzunköprü, a village in Edirne Province
- Çiftlikköy, Yığılca, a village in Düzce Province

== See also ==
- Çiftlik (disambiguation)
