= Gökçeler =

Gökçeler (literally the plural form of "celestial") is a Turkish place name that may refer to the following places in Turkey:

- Gökçeler, Çerkeş
- Gökçeler, Gölpazarı, a village in Gölpazarı district of Bilecik Province, Turkey
- Gökçeler, İvrindi, a village
- Gökçeler, Milas, a village in Milas district of Muğla Province, Turkey
- Gökçeler, Seyhan, a village in Seyhan district of Adana Province, Turkey
- Gökçeler, Tavas
- Gökçeler Canyon, a canyon next to Gökçeler, Milas village in Muğla Province, Turkey
