= Dikenli =

Dikenli can refer to:

- Dikenli, Çerkeş
- Dikenli, Dodurga
- Dikenli, Korgun
