= Örenli =

Örenli can refer to:

- Örenli, Bayramiç
- Örenli, Çerkeş
- Örenli, Gölbaşı
