= Dodurga =

Dodurga may refer to:

== Places ==
- Dodurga, Çerkeş
- Dodurga, Çorum, a district center in Çorum Province
- Dodurga, Bilecik, a town in Bozüyük district of Bilecik Province
- Dodurga, Orta
- Dodurga, Sandıklı, a village in Sandıklı district of Afyonkarahisar Province

== People ==
- Dodurga (tribe), an Oghuz Turkic tribe

== See also ==
- Dodurga Dam
