= Kocagür =

Kocagür can refer to:

- Kocagür, Aydın
- Kocagür, Biga
