= Euhippe =

Town of ancient Caria

Coordinates: 37°47′15″N 28°05′12″E

Euhippe (Ancient Greek: Εὐίππη) was a town of ancient Caria, inhabited during Hellenistic and Roman times.

Its site is located near Dalama in Asiatic Turkey.
