= Üçyol =

Üçyol can refer to:

- Üçyol, Bayramiç
- Üçyol, Düzce
- Üçyol, Hasankeyf
- Üçyol–Fuar İzmir Line
- Üçyol (İzmir Metro)
