= Çırpılar =

Çırpılar can refer to:

- Çırpılar, Bayramiç
- Çırpılar, Yenice
