= Horozköy =

Horozköy can refer to:

- Horozköy, Aydın
- Horozköy, Yeşilova
- Horozköy railway station
