= Güzeltepe =

Güzeltepe can refer to:

- Güzeltepe, Bayramiç
- Güzeltepe, Söke
