= Çift-Hane =

The çift-hane system was the basic unit of agrarian land holding and taxation in the Ottoman Empire from its beginning. The pre-modern Ottoman system of land tenure was based on the distribution of land between publicly owned lands, miri and privately owned lands mülk, and the majority of the arable land was miri, especially grain-producing land. Peasants were the vast majority of the empire, and they worked as farmers on land designated as miri, relying heavily on wheat-barley production for their subsistence. The peasant household had been the basic form of agrarian production in much of the land ruled by the Ottomans since Roman times, and this had continued through Byzantine rule. So, the çift-hane system was based on the realities which were present in much of the lands the Ottomans conquered: a class of free peasants cultivating their own land, and a taxation policy combining Byzantine, Ottoman, and Islamic rules.

== The çiftlik basic unit ==
The basic unit of the system was a married peasant male with a unit of arable land workable by a pair of oxen. The organization of this system was based on a combination of the family's labor capacity, hane, and the capacity of a pair of yoked oxen çift. Çiftlik is also the common word for farm in Turkish. The family's labor capacity determined the size and production capacity of the farm, but the unit of land, or the çiftlik, had to be large enough to feed the family and to produce surplus for taxes. The peasants' goal was not to maximize their interest or to create surplus, but to meet the needs of their family.

Some public agricultural lands of the empire were divided into fiefs called timars. The timars were, in turn, divided into çiftliks. Fiefs were held usually by sipahi, or cavalry men, who did not own the land but oversaw it in the name of the sultan, who owned all arable land. A timar holder was responsible for collecting taxes on the land and maintaining security. Grain in the form of a tithe was the main source of revenue for the holder. Sipahi benefited from a certain amount of the revenue collected, and in return provided troops during Ottoman campaigns. Under Beyazid I, Mehmed II and the 16th-century sultans, much of the state çiftlik land was converted to the timar system. Collections of çift lands could also be held by religious leaders called mullah or could be vaqf, land set aside for charity, or were later under the malikâne (tax farming) system.

The agrarian-fiscal system of the empire was based on the taxation of this land, called the çift-resmi, or çift-tax. The peasant could organize the production of the family farm, but his mobility and his use of the land was regulated, and he had to give to the state the percentage of his revenue that had been decided at that time. In the system of taxation, the peasant household counted as a single unit with a single annual income. The amount of land and the labor capacity of the family, with different classifications for men, women and children, determined each household's tax status. The central bureaucracy oversaw this system with surveys every twenty or thirty years and registration of each family farm unit. This taxation was generally used for Muslim peasants, and while Christians often cultivated lands within the system, rules for their taxation were usually based on a head tax plus an annually set agrarian tax in miri villages.

== State control and centralization ==
Continuation of the system depended heavily on centralist state control of land possession and labor. An important aspect of this was the state's (i.e. the sultan's) absolute ownership of all land, and "this lack of private ownership reinforced the core of the patrimonial system: the ruler's ability to maintain and secure his position"; however, land ownership was complex during Ottoman rule. This is the reason why historian Attila Aytekin calls absolute land ownership in the empire a "legal fiction." The reality was defined by a tension between provincial agents and state control. The state's main concerns about the çift-hane system for much of the Ottoman reign were maintaining the integrity of family farms, keeping peasants on the land, and ensuring the protection of subsistence crops.

The central bureaucracy dealt with the encroachment of local lords and provincial agents attempting to become provincial gentry from the 16th century onwards. The Ottoman state maintained the system by declaring dry-farming regions to be state owned and by protecting the integrity of the peasant household. The Ottoman state wanted all lands in the form of çiftlik in order to prevent the land's integration into landed properties and partition into smaller units. For this same reason, the central state often reassigned provincial governors to prevent them from acquiring loyalties. The system of timar-holding upheld this state centralism because the labor of the peasants helped maintain the military exploits of the empire—providing not only revenue but labor in the form of land cultivation and collection of firewood and straw for military families. However, the peasants resented these direct forms of servitude towards land holders, which is why the central state sought to maintain or even convert land to the çiftlik form of taxation. A main concern of the state was to keep peasants on the land, which was why peasants were not allowed to relocate. Land holders were incentivized to keep peasants on the land because peasant work was their main source of revenue.

This form of state control over agricultural production meant that there was no direct or free commercialization of agriculture. Any growth that took place was the result of land holders' introduction of surpluses (any grain they did not have to give up as taxes to the central government) of marketable crops into villages and cities. Laws governing the system were called kanunname, and stipulated that if a peasant left his çiftlik uncultivated for 3 years, he lost any rights to the land and the holder granted the land to anyone who could use it and pay its taxes. This law was established because uncultivated land meant a loss of state revenue. Laws also prevented sons of land holders' inheriting timars, and the primary reason the state implemented these laws was to prevent full commodification of land. The tension between interests of state control and commercial interests of state agents is a complex issue in Ottoman historiography. Conventional Turkish historians argue that classical Ottoman law based on the peasant household continued through the 17th and 18th centuries in Anatolia, but that commercial estates in the Balkans came with the decentralization of the 17th century. The conventional view is that while centralization did allow the corrupt to convert public lands into private commercial estates, this was true for only a small amount of land and was not influential. Others argue that the estates most likely held more importance than their actual physical area, even though it was true that most of the arable land in the empire remained in small peasant landholdings. Attila Aytekin argues that "the mid-nineteenth century witnessed several rebellions and countless disturbances where the estates or the attempts to create estates were a constant source of conflict." Despite extreme tensions and complications which multiplied over time, the state largely ignored this tension of landholding until the Land Code of 1859.

== Effects on the broader economy ==
The historian Huri İslamoğlu-İnan argues that the political-legal structures that the state attempted to retain affected change in the organization of peasant production, and ensured that any agricultural economic growth did not lead to the "normal" changes which occurred in the West, where capitalist economies lead to the commercialization of farm land. Since the çift-hane system within the timar system of land holding constituted the fiscal base of the empire, when Ottoman conquests began to slow down, perpetuation of this system became the basis of the state's political authority. Ideologically, this control was a manifestation of the state as "dispenser of justice and perpetuator of the 'eternal order.'" As previously noted, the state's central control was a means to prevent the accumulation of trade profits by revenue holders and the rise of local power that "could pose a threat to the state's political authority." This, according to İslamoğlu-İnan, lead to regional economies that had little trade relations outside a given region. In addition, commercial development dictated by the marketing of surpluses by land holders meant that peasant integration into the economy was superficial, as it was simply a function of taxation.

== Decline and abolition ==
When the timar system was disrupted during the early 17th century, many peasant çiftliks were taken over by palace favorites of the sultan. Janissaries also took possession of them during the same period in what was called the Great Flight, when many peasants in Anatolia abandoned their land. Ayan (provincial gentry) took possession of çiftliks because of administrative abuses. This pattern of abuses continued into the 18th century.

Despite differing arguments about political and state functions, this system of state ownership with peasant households as the basic unit persisted outside of capitalism into the 19th century. There was a transformation of the provincial order from the 16th to the 18th century, defined by consolidation of discrete units of administration tied to Istanbul, but also a development of different definitions of property in relation to the state fiscal system. These two developments led to the conflict between ownership and distribution of revenue. One important development was the introduction of the malikâne (tax farming) system, which changed relations of distribution. The expansion of tax farms in the 17th century affected the way in which governors were able to collect taxes from the peasantry, and introduced investors into the rural system, both of which undermined the çift-hane system. Some historians argue that a source of complications within the system was the changes of the Tanzimat era, during which reformers at least partially substituted the traditional imperial system for more liberal policies. There is a debate among historians of the Ottoman Empire about whether or not the Ottoman Land Code of 1858 was a break from the Ottoman tradition of state ownership of land. Some argue that it did not constitute any change because it put limitations on holders of public land, and most especially because it explicitly protected absolute ownership and did not recognize private property. However, others argue that due to the vagueness of these restrictions, the notion of imperial ownership was simply a formality, and that the Code allowed for more modern transfer of land. It also made inheriting land much easier, which can be seen as a sign of the liberalization of Ottoman land law.

One sign of change within the çift-hane system were the Serbian Uprisings at the beginning of the 19th century. As previously stated, a çiftlik was traditionally run by a military family; however, at this time problems of the state and decentralization led to the emergence of large, semi-private estates owned by Janissaries. These new farms downgraded the status of the peasants so that "Serbian sharecroppers became de facto serfs on their own land." Thus, one of the demands of the Serbian rebels was the elimination of the çiftlik.
