= Hacıdervişler, Bayramiç =

Village in Turkey

Hacıdervişler
- Village
- Location in Turkey Hacıdervişler (Marmara)
- Coordinates: 39°57′N 26°44′E
- Country: Turkey
- Province: Çanakkale
- District: Bayramiç
- Population (2021): 70
- Time zone: UTC+3 (TRT)

Hacıdervişler is a village in the Bayramiç District of Çanakkale Province in Turkey. Its population is 70 (2021). Hacıdervişler is situated northwest of Söğütgediği.
