= Bıyıklı =

Bıyıklı may refer to:

- Bıyıklı, Bayramiç
- Bıyıklı, Döşemealtı
- Bıyıklı, Koçarlı
