= Çiftlik =

Çiftlik (literally "farm" in Turkish) may refer to:

- Chiflik, the non-Turkish spelling of an Ottoman system of land management
- Çiftlik, Emirdağ, a village in the district of Emirdağ, Afyonkarahisar Province, Turkey
- Çiftlik, Gölpazarı, a village in the district of Gölpazarı, Bilecik Province, Turkey
- Çiftlik, Horasan, a neighbourhood in Erzurum Province, Turkey
- Çiftlik, Kovancılar, a village in Elazığ Province, Turkey
- Çiftlik, Marmaris, a village in the district of Marmaris, Muğla Province, Turkey
- Çiftlik, Niğde, a town and district of Niğde Province, Turkey
- Çiftlik, Osmaneli, a village in the district of Osmaneli, Bilecik Province, Turkey
- Çiftlik, Şavşat, a village in the district of Şavşat, Artvin Province, Turkey
- Çiftlik, Tarsus, a village in district of Tarsus, Mersin Province, Turkey
- Çiftlik, Taşköprü, a village in Kastamonu Province, Turkey
- Çiftlik, Tut, a village in the district of Tut, Adıyaman Province, Turkey
- Çiftlik, Yenice, a village in Çanakkale Province, Turkey

== See also ==
- Çiftlikköy (disambiguation)
