= Karacahisar, Milas =

Karacahisar
- Neighbourhood
- Location in Turkey Karacahisar (Turkey Aegean)
- Coordinates: 37°08′58″N 27°48′20″E
- Country: Turkey
- Province: Muğla
- District: Milas
- Elevation: 150 m (490 ft)
- Population (2022): 611
- Time zone: UTC+3 (TRT)

Karacahisar is a neighbourhood of the municipality and district of Milas, Muğla Province, Turkey. Its population is 611 (2022).

The village is located at a distance of 22 km (14 mi) to the district center of Milas and 91 km (57 mi) to the province center of Muğla. Its elevation is 150 m (490 ft) AMSL.

Gökçeler Canyon and İncirliin Cave inside the canyon are visitor attractions next to the village.
