= Kalfaköy =

Kalfaköy can refer to the following villages in Turkey:

- Kalfaköy, Aydın
- Kalfaköy, Susurluk
