= Yumaklı =

Yumaklı may refer to:

- Yumaklı, Çerkeş
- Yumaklı, Kütahya, a village in the Merkez (Central) district of Kütahya Province, Turkey
- Yumaklı, Yenipazar
