= Gözpınar =

Gözpınar (literally "eye spring") is a Turkish place name that may refer to the following places in Turkey:

- Gözpınar, Aydın, a village in the district of Aydın, Aydın Province
- Gözpınar, Bartın, a village in the district of Bartın, Bartın Province
- Gözpınar, Elâzığ
- Gözpınar, Gerger, a village in the district of Gerger, Adıyaman Province
- Gözpınar, Kurtalan
