= Bezirganlar =

Bezirganlar can refer to:

- Bezirganlar, Bayramiç
- Bezirganlar, Biga
