= Kısaç =

Kısaç can refer to:

- Kisač, Serbia
- Kısaç, Çerkeş
- Kısaç, Orta
