= Yıprak =

Yıprak can refer to:

- Yıprak, Çerkeş
- Yıprak, Dinar
