= Çördük =

Çördük can refer to:

- Çördük, Çerkeş
- Çördük, Taşköprü
