= Belkavak =

Belkavak can refer to:

- Belkavak, Araç
- Belkavak, Çerkeş
- Belkavak, Osmancık
