= Besik =

Besik or Bessik (Georgian: ბესიკ) is a Georgian male given name that may refer to

- Besik Amashukeli (born 1972), Georgian football player
- Besik Aslanasvili (born 1976), Greek freestyle wrestler
- Besik Beradze (born 1968), Georgian football player
- Bessik Khamashuridze (born 1977), Georgian rugby union coach and former player
- Besik Kudukhov (1986–2013), Russian freestyle wrestler
- Besik Lezhava (born 1986), Georgian basketball player
- Besik Shengelia (born 1967), Georgian naval officer

== See also ==
- Beşik, Bayramiç
- Beşik Bay, Çanakkale
