= Pınardere =

Pınardere can refer to:

- Pınardere, Aydın
- Pınardere, Ayvacık
