= Yoncalı =

Yoncalı (literally "with clovers" in Turkish) may refer to:

- Yoncalı, Bayat
- Yoncalı, Bayburt, a village in the district of Bayburt, Bayburt Province, Turkey
- Yoncalı, Çerkeş
- Yoncalı, Ergani
- Yoncalı, Şavşat, a village in the district of Şavşat, Artvin Province, Turkey
- Yoncalı Dam, Turkey
