= Karaşar =

Karaşar can refer to:

- Karaşar, Beypazarı
- Karaşar, Çerkeş
- Karaşar, Göynücek
