= Bedil =

Bedil can refer to:

- Bedil (term), a term used for various early firearms and gunpowder weapons from Maritime Southeast Asia
  - Bedil tombak, one such firearm

== Places ==
- Bedil, Çerkeş, in Çankırı Province, Turkey
- Bedil, Bartın, in Bartın Province, Turkey

== People ==
- ʿAbd al-Qādir Bēdil Dihlawī (1642–1720), Indian Sufi saint and poet from Delhi
- Qadir Bux Bedil (1815–1873), Sindhi Sufi poet and scholar
- Bedil Masroor (born 1947), Pakistani producer, writer and singer
