= Çakmak =

Çakmak may refer to:

== People ==
- Esma Nur Çakmak (born 2004), Turkish arm wrestler
- Fevzi Çakmak (1876–1950), Field marshal and prime minister of Turkey
- Nurhan Çakmak (born 1981), Turkish football player
- Osman Çakmak (born 1977), Turkish amputee football player and manager
- Serhat Çakmak (born 1995), Turkish football player
- Yasin Çakmak (born 1985), Turkish football player
- Mustafa Avcioğlu-Çakmak (1909-2009), Turkish wrestler

== Places ==
- Çakmak, Çerkeş, a village in Çankırı Province, Turkey
- Çakmak, Gazipaşa, a village in Antalya Province, Turkey
- Çakmak, Gönen, a village in Balıkesir Province, Turkey
- Çakmak, Harmancık, a village in Bursa Province, Turkey
- Çakmak, Hınıs, a town in Erzurum Province, Turkey
- Çakmak, Merkezefendi, a neighbourhood in Denizli Province, Turkey
- Çakmak, Nurdağı, a neighbourhood in Gaziantep Province, Turkey
- Çakmak, Uzunköprü or Çakmakköy, a village in Edirne Province, Turkey
- Çakmak, Yenişehir, a village in Diyarbakır Province, Turkey
