= Yeşilöz =

Yeşilöz may refer to the following places in Turkey:

- Yeşilöz, Alanya, a beach resort village (yayla) in the district of Alanya, Antalya Province
- Yeşilöz, Amasya, a village in the district of Amasya, Amasya Province
- Yeşilöz, Batman, a village in the district of Batman, Batman Province
- Yeşilöz, Çerkeş
- Yeşilöz, Güdül, a town in the district of Güdül, Ankara Province
- Yeşilöz, Gülşehir, a village in the district of Gülşehir, Nevşehir Province
- Yeşilöz, Horasan
- Yeşilöz, İnebolu, a village
- Yeşilöz, Kalecik, a village in the district of Kalecik, Ankara Province
- Yeşilöz, Köprüköy
- Yeşilöz, Kurşunlu
- Yeşilöz, Polatlı, a village in the district of Polatlı, Ankara Province
