= Kırıklar =

Kırıklar can refer to:

- Kırıklar, Aydın
- Kırıklar, Yenice
