= Şevketiye =

Şevketiye can refer to:

- Şevketiye, Aydın
- Şevketiye, Kestel
- Şevketiye, Lapseki
