= Kabakköy =

Kabakköy can refer to:

- Kabakköy, Çerkeş
- Kabakköy, Polatlı
- Kabakköy, Seben
