= Eğrikavak =

Eğrikavak can refer to:

- Eğrikavak, Aydın
- Eğrikavak, Maden
