= Yassıbağ =

Yassıbağ can refer to:

- Yassıbağ, Bayramiç
- Yassıbağ, Gülnar
