= Fındıcak =

Fındıcak can refer to:

- Fındıcak, Çerkeş
- Fındıcak, Gemlik
- Fındıcak, Mudurnu
- Fındıcak, Osmancık
