= Yakuplar =

Yakuplar can refer to:

- Yakuplar, Bolu
- Yakuplar, Çerkeş
