= Işıkeli =

Işıkeli can refer to:

- Işıkeli, Biga
- Işıkeli, Bayramiç
