= Dodurga District =

District of Çorum Province, Turkey

- District
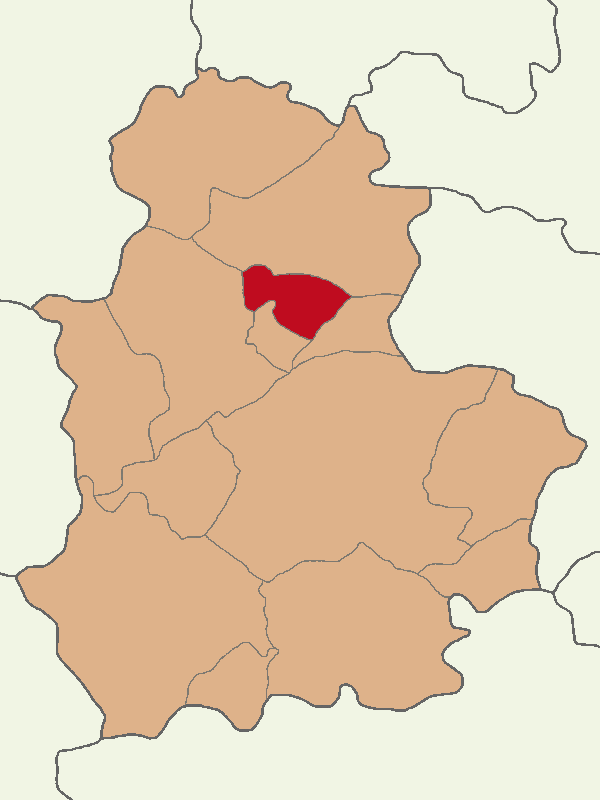
- Map showing Dodurga District in Çorum Province

- Location in Turkey
- Coordinates: 40°20′N 34°20′E
- Country: Turkey
- Province: Çorum
- Seat: Dodurga

Government
  - Kaymakam: Ramazan Çelebi
- Area: 229 km^{2} (88 sq mi)
- Population (2022): 5,265
  - Density: 23/km^{2} (60/sq mi)
- Time zone: UTC+3 (TRT)
- Website: www.dodurga.gov.tr

Dodurga District is a district of the Çorum Province of Turkey. Its seat is the town of Dodurga. Its area is 229 km^{2}, and its population is 5,265 (2022).

== Composition ==
There is one municipality in Dodurga District:

- Dodurga

There are 12 villages in Dodurga District:

- Akkaya
- Alpagut
- Ayvaköy
- Berkköy
- Çiftlikköy
- Dikenli
- Kirenci
- Kuyucak
- Mehmetdedeobruğu
- Mehmetdedetekkesi
- Tutuş
- Yeniköy
