= Zeytinköy, Aydın =

Zeytinköy
- Neighbourhood
- Location in Turkey Zeytinköy (Turkey Aegean)
- Coordinates: 37°53′53″N 27°51′22″E
- Country: Turkey
- Province: Aydın
- District: Efeler
- Population (2022): 211
- Time zone: UTC+3 (TRT)

Zeytinköy is a neighbourhood in the municipality and district of Efeler, Aydın Province, Turkey. Its population is 211 (2022).
