= Kuyucak, Dodurga =

Village in Turkey

Kuyucak
- Village
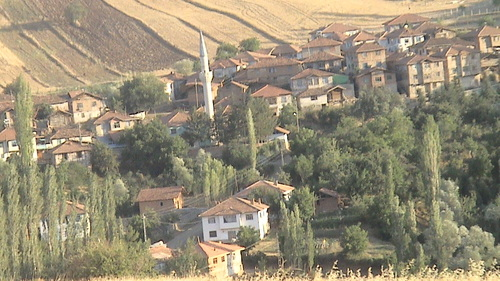
- Place in Dodurga District of Çorum Province, Turkey

- Location within Turkey
- Country: Turkey
- Province: Çorum
- District: Dodurga
- Population (2022): 96
- Time zone: UTC+3 (TRT)

Kuyucak is a village in the Dodurga District of Çorum Province in Turkey. Its population is 96 (2022).
