= Gelik Ovacık, Çerkeş =

Village in Turkey

Gelik Ovacık
- Village
- Country: Turkey
- Province: Çankırı
- District: Çerkeş
- Population (2021): 83
- Time zone: UTC+3 (TRT)

Gelik Ovacık is a village in the Çerkeş District of Çankırı Province in Turkey. Its population is 83 (2021).
