= Konuklu, Aydın =

Konuklu
- Neighbourhood
- Country: Turkey
- Province: Aydın
- District: Efeler
- Population (2022): 814
- Time zone: UTC+3 (TRT)

Konuklu is a neighbourhood in the municipality and district of Efeler, Aydın Province, Turkey. Its population is 814 (2022).
