= Orta, Efeler =

Village in Turkey

Orta
- Neighbourhood
- Location in Turkey Orta (Turkey Aegean)
- Coordinates: 37°50′43″N 27°51′19″E
- Country: Turkey
- Province: Aydın
- District: Efeler
- Population (2024): 8,169
- Time zone: UTC+3 (TRT)

Orta is a neighbourhood in the municipality and district of Efeler, Aydın Province, Turkey. Its population is 8,169 (2024).
