= Bayındır, Çerkeş =

Village in Turkey

Bayındır
- Village
- Location in Turkey Bayındır (Turkey Central Anatolia)
- Coordinates: 40.8228°N 32.7765°E
- Country: Turkey
- Province: Çankırı
- District: Çerkeş
- Population (2021): 129
- Time zone: UTC+3 (TRT)

Bayındır is a village in the Çerkeş District of Çankırı Province in Turkey. Its population is 129 (2021).
