= Karaköy, Aydın =

Karaköy
- Neighbourhood
- Location within Turkey Location within Turkey Aegean
- Coordinates: 37.915547°N 27.896792°E
- Country: Turkey
- Province: Aydın
- District: Efeler
- Population (2022): 294
- Time zone: UTC+3 (TRT)

Karaköy is a neighbourhood in the municipality and district of Efeler, Aydın Province, Turkey. Its population is 294 as of 2022.
