= Köprülü Veysipaşa, Efeler =

Village in Turkey

Köprülü Veysipaşa
- Neighbourhood
- Location in Turkey Köprülü Veysipaşa (Turkey Aegean)
- Coordinates: 37°51′12″N 27°50′29″E
- Country: Turkey
- Province: Aydın
- District: Efeler
- Population (2024): 3,685
- Time zone: UTC+3 (TRT)

Köprülü Veysipaşa is a neighbourhood in the municipality and district of Efeler, Aydın Province, Turkey. Its population is 3,685 (2024).
