= Gödrenli, Aydın =

Gödrenli
- Neighbourhood
- Location in Turkey Gödrenli (Turkey Aegean)
- Coordinates: 37°48′N 28°06′E
- Country: Turkey
- Province: Aydın
- District: Efeler
- Population (2022): 336
- Time zone: UTC+3 (TRT)

Gödrenli is a neighbourhood in the municipality and district of Efeler, Aydın Province, Turkey. Its population is 336 (2022).
