= Muratlar, Bayramiç =

Village in Turkey

Muratlar
- Village
- Country: Turkey
- Province: Çanakkale
- District: Bayramiç
- Population (2021): 437
- Time zone: UTC+3 (TRT)

Muratlar is a village in the Bayramiç District of Çanakkale Province in Turkey. Its population is 437 (2021).
