= Aşağışevik, Bayramiç =

Village in Turkey

Aşağışevik
- Village
- Location in Turkey Aşağışevik (Marmara)
- Coordinates: 39°53′N 26°40′E
- Country: Turkey
- Province: Çanakkale
- District: Bayramiç
- Population (2021): 41
- Time zone: UTC+3 (TRT)

Aşağışevik is a village in the Bayramiç District of Çanakkale Province in Turkey. Its population is 41 (2021).
