= Tepeköy, Aydın =

Tepeköy
- Neighbourhood
- Location in Turkey Tepeköy (Turkey Aegean)
- Coordinates: 37.781596°N 27.900623°E
- Country: Turkey
- Province: Aydın
- District: Efeler
- Population (2022): 323
- Time zone: UTC+3 (TRT)

Tepeköy is a neighbourhood in the municipality and district of Efeler, Aydın Province, Turkey. Its population is 323 (2022).
