= Terziler, Aydın =

Terziler
- Neighbourhood
- Location in Turkey Terziler (Turkey Aegean)
- Coordinates: 37.910262°N 27.956918°E
- Country: Turkey
- Province: Aydın
- District: Efeler
- Population (2022): 558
- Time zone: UTC+3 (TRT)

Terziler is a neighbourhood in the municipality and district of Efeler, Aydın Province, Turkey. Its population is 558 as of 2022.
