= Korucak, Bayramiç =

Village in Turkey

Korucak
- Village
- Country: Turkey
- Province: Çanakkale
- District: Bayramiç
- Population (2021): 102
- Time zone: UTC+3 (TRT)

Korucak is a village in the Bayramiç District of Çanakkale Province in Turkey. Its population is 102 (2021).
