= Kiremitçi, Çerkeş =

Village in Turkey

Kiremitçi
- Village
- Country: Turkey
- Province: Çankırı
- District: Çerkeş
- Population (2021): 151
- Time zone: UTC+3 (TRT)

Kiremitçi is a village in the Çerkeş District of Çankırı Province in Turkey. Its population is 151 (2021).

== History ==
The old name of the village is mentioned as Yortan, which means "runner, nomad, tribe name" in Turkish in 1928 records.
