= Çerkeş District =

District of Çankırı Province, Turkey

- District
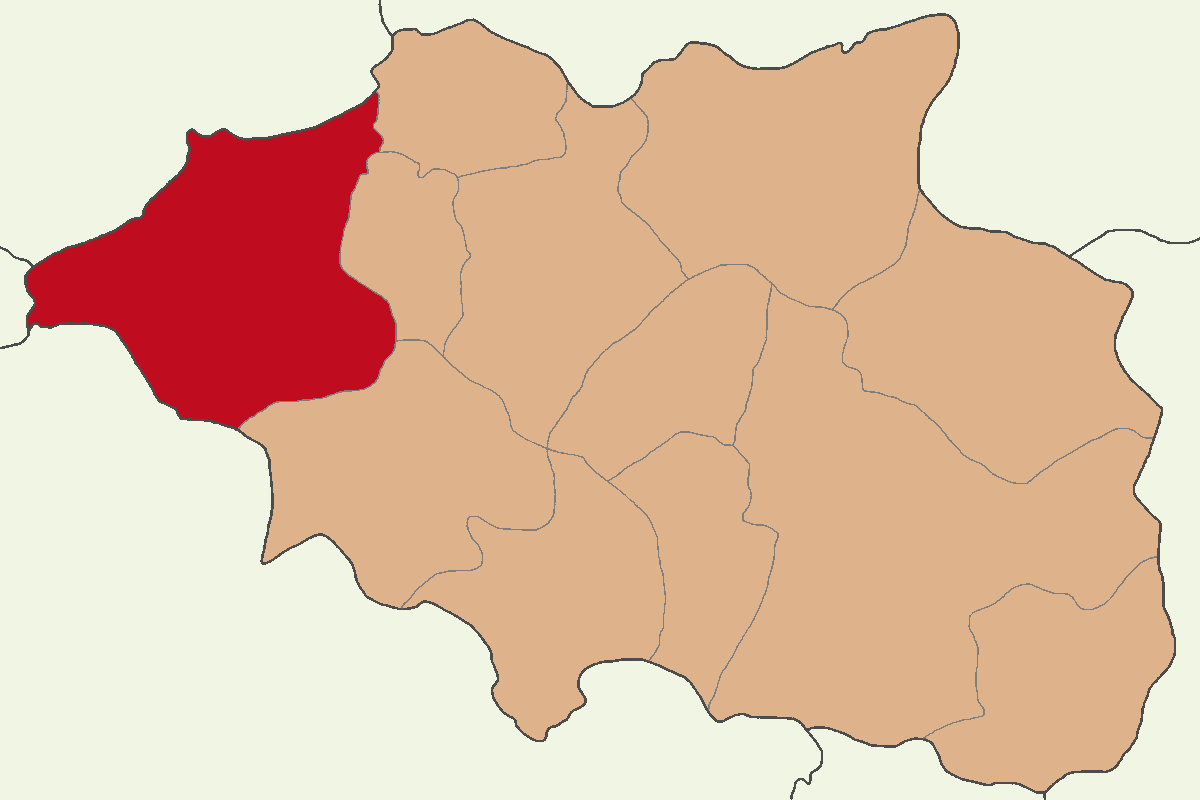
- Map showing Çerkeş District in Çankırı Province

- Location in Turkey Çerkeş District (Turkey Central Anatolia)
- Coordinates: 40°48′N 32°53′E
- Country: Turkey
- Province: Çankırı
- Seat: Çerkeş

Government
  - Kaymakam: Emir Osman Bulgurlu
- Area: 947 km^{2} (366 sq mi)
- Population (2021): 16,746
  - Density: 18/km^{2} (46/sq mi)
- Time zone: UTC+3 (TRT)
- Website: www.cerkes.gov.tr

Çerkeş District is a district of the Çankırı Province of Turkey. Its seat is the town of Çerkeş. Its area is 947 km^{2}, and its population is 16,746 (2021).

== Composition ==
There are two municipalities in Çerkeş District:

- Çerkeş
- Saçak

There are 49 villages in Çerkeş District:

- Afşar
- Ağaca
- Akbaş
- Akhasan
- Aliözü
- Aydınlar
- Bayındır
- Bedil
- Belkavak
- Beymelik
- Bozoğlu
- Çakmak
- Çalcıören
- Çaylı
- Çördük
- Dağçukurören
- Dikenli
- Dodurga
- Fındıcak
- Gelik Ovacık
- Gökçeler
- Göynükçukuru
- Hacılar
- Halkaoğlu
- Kabakköy
- Kadıköy
- Kadıözü
- Karacahüyük
- Karamustafa
- Karaşar
- Karga
- Kısaç
- Kiremitçi
- Kuzdere
- Kuzören
- Meydanköy
- Örenköy
- Örenli
- Saraycık
- Şeyhdoğan
- Taşanlar
- Turbaşı
- Uluköy
- Yakuplar
- Yeniköy
- Yeşilöz
- Yıprak
- Yoncalı
- Yumaklı
