= Dağçukurören, Çerkeş =

Village in Turkey

Dağçukurören
- Village
- Location in Turkey Dağçukurören (Turkey Central Anatolia)
- Coordinates: 40°43′55″N 32°50′24″E
- Country: Turkey
- Province: Çankırı
- District: Çerkeş
- Population (2021): 93
- Time zone: UTC+3 (TRT)

Dağçukurören is a village in the Çerkeş District of Çankırı Province in Turkey. Its population is 93 (2021).
