= Turbaşı, Çerkeş =

Village in Turkey

Turbaşı
- Village
- Location in Turkey Turbaşı (Turkey Central Anatolia)
- Coordinates: 40°47′N 32°51′E
- Country: Turkey
- Province: Çankırı
- District: Çerkeş
- Population (2021): 115
- Time zone: UTC+3 (TRT)

Turbaşı is a village in the Çerkeş District of Çankırı Province in Turkey. Its population is 115 (2021).
