= Yahşieli, Bayramiç =

Village in Turkey

Yahşieli
- Village
- Location in Turkey Yahşieli (Marmara)
- Coordinates: 39°45′N 26°27′E
- Country: Turkey
- Province: Çanakkale
- District: Bayramiç
- Population (2021): 192
- Time zone: UTC+3 (TRT)

Yahşieli is a village in the Bayramiç District of Çanakkale Province in Turkey. Its population is 192 (2021).
