= Daloba, Bayramiç =

Village in Turkey

Daloba
- Village
- Location in Turkey Daloba (Marmara)
- Coordinates: 39°45′N 26°40′E
- Country: Turkey
- Province: Çanakkale
- District: Bayramiç
- Population (2021): 381
- Time zone: UTC+3 (TRT)

Daloba is a village in the Bayramiç District of Çanakkale Province in Turkey. Its population is 381 (2021).
