= Doğan, Aydın =

Doğan
- Neighbourhood
- Location in Turkey Doğan (Turkey Aegean)
- Coordinates: 37.883466°N 27.872175°E
- Country: Turkey
- Province: Aydın
- District: Efeler
- Population (2022): 382
- Time zone: UTC+3 (TRT)

Doğan is a neighbourhood in the municipality and district of Efeler, Aydın Province, Turkey. Its population is 382 (2022).
