= Çaylı, Çerkeş =

Village in Turkey

Çaylı
- Village
- Country: Turkey
- Province: Çankırı
- District: Çerkeş
- Population (2021): 29
- Time zone: UTC+3 (TRT)

Çaylı is a village in the Çerkeş District of Çankırı Province in Turkey. Its population is 29 (2021).
