= Yukarışapçı, Bayramiç =

Village in Turkey

Yukarışapçı
- Village
- Location in Turkey Yukarışapçı (Marmara)
- Coordinates: 39°58′35″N 26°41′47″E
- Country: Turkey
- Province: Çanakkale
- District: Bayramiç
- Population (2021): 90
- Time zone: UTC+3 (TRT)

Yukarışapçı is a village in the Bayramiç District of Çanakkale Province in Turkey. Its population is 90 (2021).
