= Dağoba, Bayramiç =

Village in Turkey

Dağoba
- Village
- Location in Turkey Dağoba (Marmara)
- Coordinates: 39°47′N 26°50′E
- Country: Turkey
- Province: Çanakkale
- District: Bayramiç
- Population (2021): 48
- Time zone: UTC+3 (TRT)

Dağoba is a village in the Bayramiç District of Çanakkale Province in Turkey. Its population is 48 (2021).
