= Tutuş, Dodurga =

Village in Turkey

Tutuş
- Village
- Location in Turkey
- Coordinates: 40°52′N 34°46′E
- Country: Turkey
- Province: Çorum
- District: Dodurga
- Population (2022): 339
- Time zone: UTC+3 (TRT)

Tutuş is a village in the Dodurga District of Çorum Province in Turkey. Its population is 339 (2022).
