= Mesudiye, Efeler =

Village in Turkey

Mesudiye
- Neighbourhood
- Location in Turkey Mesudiye (Turkey Aegean)
- Coordinates: 37°51′20″N 27°50′02″E
- Country: Turkey
- Province: Aydın
- District: Efeler
- Population (2024): 5,381
- Time zone: UTC+3 (TRT)

Mesudiye is a neighbourhood in the municipality and district of Efeler, Aydın Province, Turkey. Its population is 5,381 (2024).
