= Serçeköy, Aydın =

Serçeköy
- Neighbourhood
- Location in Turkey Serçeköy (Turkey Aegean)
- Coordinates: 37°50′N 27°57′E
- Country: Turkey
- Province: Aydın
- District: Efeler
- Population (2022): 363
- Time zone: UTC+3 (TRT)

Serçeköy is a neighbourhood in the municipality and district of Efeler, Aydın Province, Turkey. Its population is 363 (2022).
