= Akkaya, Dodurga =

Village in Turkey

Akkaya
- Village
- Location in Turkey
- Coordinates: 40.8717°N 34.6298°E
- Country: Turkey
- Province: Çorum
- District: Dodurga
- Population (2022): 258
- Time zone: UTC+3 (TRT)

Akkaya is a village in the Dodurga District of Çorum Province in Turkey. Its population is 258 (2022). The village is populated by Kurds.
