= Kirenci, Dodurga =

Village in Turkey

Kirenci
- Village
- Location in Turkey
- Coordinates: 40°50′N 34°43′E
- Country: Turkey
- Province: Çorum
- District: Dodurga
- Population (2022): 108
- Time zone: UTC+3 (TRT)

Kirenci is a village in the Dodurga District of Çorum Province in Turkey. Its population is 108 (2022).
