= Alpagut, Dodurga =

Village in Turkey

Alpagut
- Village
- Location in Turkey
- Coordinates: 40.8698°N 34.7367°E
- Country: Turkey
- Province: Çorum
- District: Dodurga
- Population (2022): 442
- Time zone: UTC+3 (TRT)

Alpagut is a village in the Dodurga District of Çorum Province in Turkey. Its population is 442 (2022). Before the 2013 reorganisation, it was a town (belde).
