= Çerkeş =

- Municipality
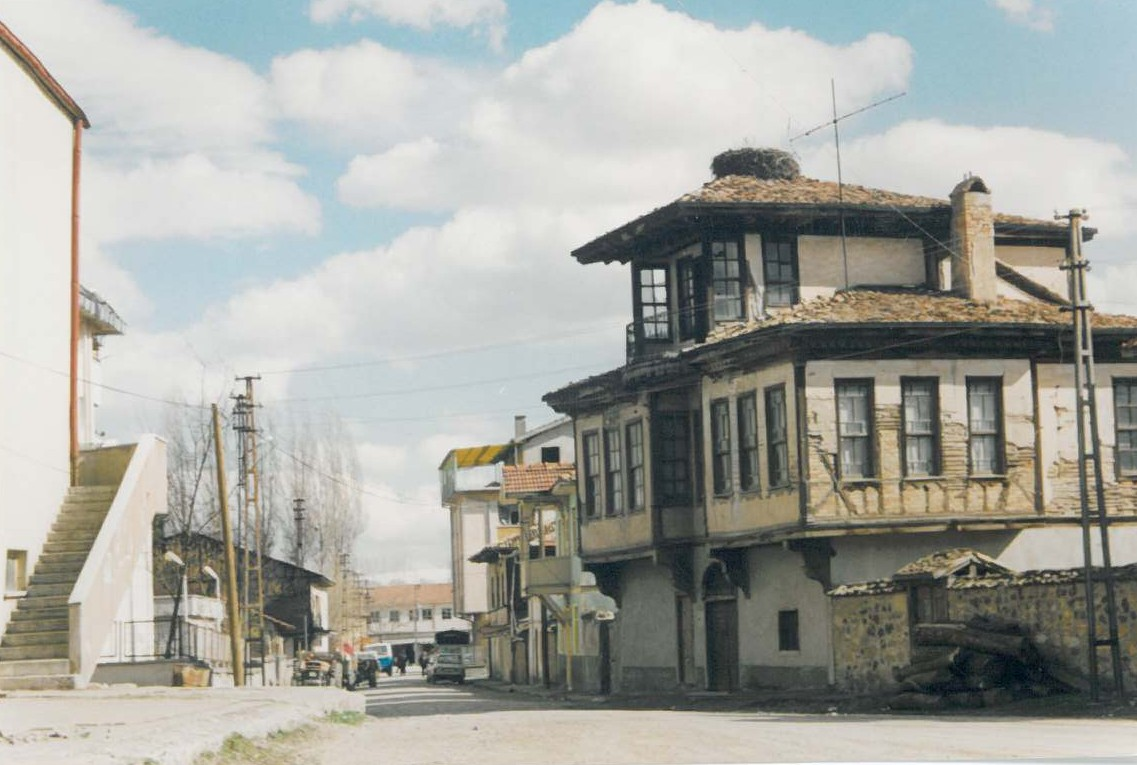

- Location within Turkey Location within Turkey Central Anatolia
- Coordinates: 40°48′50″N 32°53′27″E
- Country: Turkey
- Province: Çankırı
- District: Çerkeş

Government
  - Mayor: Hasan Sopacı (AKP)
- Elevation: 1,133 m (3,717 ft)
- Population (2021): 9,634
- Time zone: UTC+3 (TRT)
- Area code: 0376
- Website: www.cerkes.bel.tr

Çerkeş is a town in Çankırı Province in the Central Anatolia region of Turkey. It is the seat of Çerkeş District. Its population is 9,634 (2021). The elevation of the town is 1,133 m (3,717 ft).
