= Yukarıkayacık, Aydın =

Yukarıkayacık
- Neighbourhood
- Location in Turkey Yukarıkayacık (Turkey Aegean)
- Coordinates: 37°55′N 27°56′E
- Country: Turkey
- Province: Aydın
- District: Efeler
- Population (2022): 444
- Time zone: UTC+3 (TRT)

Yukarıkayacık is a neighbourhood in the municipality and district of Efeler, Aydın Province, Turkey. Its population is 444 (2022).
