= Zerdalilik, Bayramiç =

Village in Turkey

Zerdalilik
- Village
- Location in Turkey Zerdalilik (Marmara)
- Coordinates: 39°54′N 26°30′E
- Country: Turkey
- Province: Çanakkale
- District: Bayramiç
- Population (2021): 67
- Time zone: UTC+3 (TRT)

Zerdalilik is a village in the Bayramiç District of Çanakkale Province in Turkey. Its population is 67 (2021).
