= Tülüler, Bayramiç =

Village in Turkey

Tülüler
- Village
- Location in Turkey Tülüler (Marmara)
- Coordinates: 39°50′14″N 26°39′43″E
- Country: Turkey
- Province: Çanakkale
- District: Bayramiç
- Population (2021): 49
- Time zone: UTC+3 (TRT)

Tülüler is a village in the Bayramiç District of Çanakkale Province in Turkey. Its population is 49 (2021).
