= Kuyulu, Aydın =

Kuyulu
- Neighbourhood
- Location in Turkey Kuyulu (Turkey Aegean)
- Coordinates: 37°50′13″N 27°47′35″E
- Country: Turkey
- Province: Aydın
- District: Efeler
- Population (2022): 1,426
- Time zone: UTC+3 (TRT)

Kuyulu is a neighbourhood in the municipality and district of Efeler, Aydın Province, Turkey. Its population is 1,426 (2022).
