= Akpınar, Bayramiç =

Village in Turkey

Akpınar
- Village
- Location in Turkey Akpınar (Marmara)
- Coordinates: 39.7367°N 26.5460°E
- Country: Turkey
- Province: Çanakkale
- District: Bayramiç
- Population (2021): 285
- Time zone: UTC+3 (TRT)

Akpınar is a village in the Bayramiç District of Çanakkale Province in Turkey. Its population is 285 (2021).
