= Kuloğullar, Aydın =

Kuloğullar
- Neighbourhood
- Location in Turkey Kuloğullar (Turkey Aegean)
- Coordinates: 37°46′N 28°06′E
- Country: Turkey
- Province: Aydın
- District: Efeler
- Population (2022): 402
- Time zone: UTC+3 (TRT)

Kuloğullar is a neighbourhood in the municipality and district of Efeler, Aydın Province, Turkey. Its population is 402 (2022).
