= Kaykılar, Bayramiç =

Village in Turkey

Kaykılar
- Village
- Location in Turkey Kaykılar (Marmara)
- Coordinates: 39°50′N 26°44′E
- Country: Turkey
- Province: Çanakkale
- District: Bayramiç
- Population (2021): 82
- Time zone: UTC+3 (TRT)

Kaykılar is a village in the Bayramiç District of Çanakkale Province in Turkey. Its population is 82 (2021).
