= Mesutlu, Aydın =

Mesutlu
- Neighbourhood
- Location in Turkey Mesutlu (Turkey Aegean)
- Coordinates: 37°48′N 27°57′E
- Country: Turkey
- Province: Aydın
- District: Efeler
- Population (2022): 229
- Time zone: UTC+3 (TRT)

Mesutlu is a neighbourhood in the municipality and district of Efeler, Aydın Province, Turkey. Its population is 229 (2022).
