= İlyasdere, Aydın =

İlyasdere
- Neighbourhood
- Location in Turkey İlyasdere (Turkey Aegean)
- Coordinates: 37°53′N 28°01′E
- Country: Turkey
- Province: Aydın
- District: Efeler
- Population (2022): 254
- Time zone: UTC+3 (TRT)

İlyasdere is a neighbourhood in the municipality and district of Efeler, Aydın Province, Turkey. Its population is 254 (2022).
