= Aydınlar, Çerkeş =

Village in Turkey

Aydınlar
- Village
- Location in Turkey Aydınlar (Turkey Central Anatolia)
- Coordinates: 40.8503°N 32.8509°E
- Country: Turkey
- Province: Çankırı
- District: Çerkeş
- Population (2021): 70
- Time zone: UTC+3 (TRT)

Aydınlar is a village in the Çerkeş District of Çankırı Province in Turkey. Its population is 70 (2021).
