= Ağaca, Çerkeş =

Village in Turkey

Ağaca
- Village
- Location in Turkey Ağaca (Turkey Central Anatolia)
- Coordinates: 40°44′N 32°47′E
- Country: Turkey
- Province: Çankırı
- District: Çerkeş
- Population (2021): 73
- Time zone: UTC+3 (TRT)

Ağaca is a village in the Çerkeş District of Çankırı Province in Turkey. Its population is 73 (2021).
