= Ovaeymir =

- Neighbourhood
- Location in Turkey Ovaeymir (Turkey Aegean)
- Coordinates: 37°49′N 27°50′E
- Country: Turkey
- Province: Aydın
- District: Efeler
- Elevation: 70 m (230 ft)
- Population (2022): 6,942
- Time zone: UTC+3 (TRT)
- Postal code: 09020
- Area code: 0256

Ovaeymir is a neighbourhood of the municipality and district of Efeler, Aydın Province, Turkey. Its population is 6,942 (2022). Before the 2013 reorganisation, it was a town (belde). The motorway O.31 separates it from the Aydın conurbation.

The original location of Ovaeymir was by the Büyükmenderes river side. But the present Ovaeymir was founded after the original settlement was hit by a flood disaster about two centuries ago. In 1994, the settlement was declared a seat of township. The main economic sector of the town of Ovaeymir is agriculture and some residents work as construction workers in Aydın.
