= Gökçeler, Milas =

Gökçeler
- Neighbourhood
- Location in Turkey Gökçeler (Turkey Aegean)
- Coordinates: 37°11′56″N 27°44′57″E
- Country: Turkey
- Province: Muğla
- District: Milas
- Population (2022): 284
- Time zone: UTC+3 (TRT)

Gökçeler is a neighbourhood of the municipality and district of Milas, Muğla Province, Turkey. Its population is 284 (2022).

The village is located at a distance of 15 km (9.3 mi) to the district center of Milas and 84 km (52 mi) to the province center of Muğla. Gökçeler Canyon and İncirliin Cave inside the canyon are visitor attractions next to the village.
