= Meydanköy, Çerkeş =

Village in Turkey

Meydanköy
- Village
- Location in Turkey Meydanköy (Turkey Central Anatolia)
- Coordinates: 40.9197°N 32.8313°E
- Country: Turkey
- Province: Çankırı
- District: Çerkeş
- Population (2021): 45
- Time zone: UTC+3 (TRT)

Meydanköy is a village in the Çerkeş District of Çankırı Province in Turkey. Its population is 45 (2021).
