= Tepecik, Aydın =

Tepecik
- Neighbourhood
- Location in Turkey Tepecik (Turkey Aegean)
- Coordinates: 37°49′N 27°53′E
- Country: Turkey
- Province: Aydın
- District: Efeler
- Elevation: 40 m (130 ft)
- Population (2022): 4,043
- Time zone: UTC+3 (TRT)
- Postal code: 09010
- Area code: 0256

Tepecik is a neighbourhood of the municipality and district of Efeler, Aydın Province, Turkey. Its population is 4,043 (2022). Before the 2013 reorganisation, it was a town (belde). Tepecik is to the south east of Aydın city center.

== History ==
The area around the town was inhabited during the ancient ages and was known for stone pits of Tralles (modern Aydın) . During the 16th and 17th centuries, the plains of Tepecik (known as Turnalı plain ) attracted nomadic Turkmens as grazing area. They began settling in the present settlement in 1811. In 1830, the settlement was briefly controlled by Atçalı Kel Mehmet who revolted against the Ottoman authority. During Turkish War of Independence between 1919 and 1922 the settlement was under Greek rule. After the war, according to population exchange agreement, Greek population was replaced by Turks from Greece, Albania and Republic of Macedonia. In 1994, the settlement was declared the seat of the township.
