= Bayramiç =

- Municipality
- Location in Turkey Bayramiç (Marmara)
- Coordinates: 39°48′46″N 26°36′36″E
- Country: Turkey
- Province: Çanakkale
- District: Bayramiç

Government
  - Mayor: Mert Uygun (CHP)
- Elevation: 124 m (407 ft)
- Population (2021): 15,760
- Time zone: UTC+3 (TRT)
- Area code: 0286
- Website: www.bayramic.bel.tr

Bayramiç is a town in Çanakkale Province in the Marmara region of Turkey. It is the seat of Bayramiç District. Its population is 15,760 (2021). The town lies at an elevation of 124 m (407 ft).
