= Alikabaklar, Bayramiç =

Village in Turkey

Alikabaklar
- Village
- Location in Turkey Alikabaklar (Marmara)
- Coordinates: 39°42′N 26°28′E
- Country: Turkey
- Province: Çanakkale
- District: Bayramiç
- Population (2021): 157
- Time zone: UTC+3 (TRT)

Alikabaklar is a village in the Bayramiç District of Çanakkale Province in Turkey. Its population is 157 (2021).
