= Aşağıkayacık, Aydın =

Aşağıkayacık
- Neighbourhood
- Location in Turkey Aşağıkayacık (Turkey Aegean)
- Coordinates: 37.8979°N 27.9401°E
- Country: Turkey
- Province: Aydın
- District: Efeler
- Population (2022): 450
- Time zone: UTC+3 (TRT)

Aşağıkayacık is a neighbourhood in the municipality and district of Efeler, Aydın Province, Turkey. Its population is 450 (2022).
