= İmamköy, Aydın =

İmamköy
- Neighbourhood
- Location in Turkey İmamköy (Turkey Aegean)
- Coordinates: 37°51′18″N 27°54′32″E
- Country: Turkey
- Province: Aydın
- District: Efeler
- Population (2022): 1,113
- Time zone: UTC+3 (TRT)

İmamköy is a neighbourhood in the municipality and district of Efeler, Aydın Province, Turkey. Its population is 1,113 (2022).
