= Dağahmetçe, Bayramiç =

Village in Turkey

Dağahmetçe
- Village
- Location in Turkey Dağahmetçe (Marmara)
- Coordinates: 39°41′N 26°32′E
- Country: Turkey
- Province: Çanakkale
- District: Bayramiç
- Population (2021): 89
- Time zone: UTC+3 (TRT)

Dağahmetçe is a village in the Bayramiç District of Çanakkale Province in Turkey. Its population is 89 (2021).
