= Aliözü, Çerkeş =

Village in Turkey

Aliözü
- Village
- Location in Turkey Aliözü (Turkey Central Anatolia)
- Coordinates: 40.8319°N 32.9519°E
- Country: Turkey
- Province: Çankırı
- District: Çerkeş
- Population (2021): 106
- Time zone: UTC+3 (TRT)

Aliözü is a village in the Çerkeş District of Çankırı Province in Turkey. Its population is 106 (2021).
