= Zeytinli, Bayramiç =

Village in Turkey

Zeytinli
- Village
- Location in Turkey Zeytinli (Marmara)
- Coordinates: 39°50′41″N 26°30′39″E
- Country: Turkey
- Province: Çanakkale
- District: Bayramiç
- Population (2021): 66
- Time zone: UTC+3 (TRT)

Zeytinli is a village in the Bayramiç District of Çanakkale Province in Turkey. Its population is 66 (2021).
