= Yedieylül, Efeler =

Village in Turkey

Yedieylül
- Neighbourhood
- Location in Turkey Yedieylül (Turkey Aegean)
- Coordinates: 37°50′05″N 27°50′28″E
- Country: Turkey
- Province: Aydın
- District: Efeler
- Population (2024): 11,392
- Time zone: UTC+3 (TRT)

Yedieylül is a neighbourhood in the municipality and district of Efeler, Aydın Province, Turkey. Its population is 11,392 (2024).
