= Kadıköy, Çerkeş =

Village in Turkey

Kadıköy
- Village
- Location in Turkey Kadıköy (Turkey Central Anatolia)
- Coordinates: 40.807°N 32.817°E
- Country: Turkey
- Province: Çankırı
- District: Çerkeş
- Population (2021): 164
- Time zone: UTC+3 (TRT)

Kadıköy is a village in the Çerkeş District of Çankırı Province in Turkey. Its population is 164 (2021).
