= Pınarbaşı, Bayramiç =

Village in Turkey

Pınarbaşı
- Village
- Location in Turkey Pınarbaşı (Marmara)
- Coordinates: 39°46′05″N 26°32′50″E
- Country: Turkey
- Province: Çanakkale
- District: Bayramiç
- Population (2021): 329
- Time zone: UTC+3 (TRT)

Pınarbaşı is a village in the Bayramiç District of Çanakkale Province in Turkey. Its population is 329 (2021).
