= Ağaçköy, Bayramiç =

Village in Turkey

Ağaçköy
- Village
- Location in Turkey Ağaçköy (Marmara)
- Coordinates: 39.7971°N 26.5733°E
- Country: Turkey
- Province: Çanakkale
- District: Bayramiç
- Population (2021): 157
- Time zone: UTC+3 (TRT)

Ağaçköy is a village in the Bayramiç District of Çanakkale Province in Turkey. Its population is 157 (2021).
