= Evciler, Bayramiç =

Village in Turkey

Evciler
- Village
- Location in Turkey Evciler (Marmara)
- Coordinates: 39°46′40″N 26°46′11″E
- Country: Turkey
- Province: Çanakkale
- District: Bayramiç
- Population (2021): 1,346
- Time zone: UTC+3 (TRT)

Evciler is a village in the Bayramiç District of Çanakkale Province in Turkey. Its population is 1,346 (2021).
