= Gökçeiçi, Bayramiç =

Village in Turkey

Gökçeiçi
- Village
- Location in Turkey Gökçeiçi (Marmara)
- Coordinates: 39°56′N 26°33′E
- Country: Turkey
- Province: Çanakkale
- District: Bayramiç
- Population (2021): 55
- Time zone: UTC+3 (TRT)

Gökçeiçi is a village in the Bayramiç District of Çanakkale Province in Turkey. Its population is 55 (2021).
