= Böcek, Aydın =

Böcek
- Neighbourhood
- Location in Turkey Böcek (Turkey Aegean)
- Coordinates: 37°43′N 27°55′E
- Country: Turkey
- Province: Aydın
- District: Efeler
- Population (2022): 171
- Time zone: UTC+3 (TRT)

Böcek (also: Böcekköy) is a neighbourhood of the municipality and district of Efeler, Aydın Province, Turkey. Its population is 171 (2022).
