= Baltaköy, Aydın =

Baltaköy
- Neighbourhood
- Location in Turkey Baltaköy (Turkey Aegean)
- Coordinates: 37°47′N 27°54′E
- Country: Turkey
- Province: Aydın
- District: Efeler
- Population (2022): 1,118
- Time zone: UTC+3 (TRT)

Baltaköy is a neighbourhood in the municipality and district of Efeler, Aydın Province, Turkey. Its population is 1,118 (2022).
