= Gölhisar, Aydın =

Gölhisar
- Neighbourhood
- Location in Turkey Gölhisar (Turkey Aegean)
- Coordinates: 37.797271°N 27.924312°E
- Country: Turkey
- Province: Aydın
- District: Efeler
- Population (2022): 685
- Time zone: UTC+3 (TRT)

Gölhisar is a neighbourhood in the municipality and district of Efeler, Aydın Province, Turkey. Its population is 685 (2022).
