= Afşar, Çerkeş =

Village in Turkey

Afşar
- Village
- Location in Turkey Afşar (Turkey Central Anatolia)
- Coordinates: 40.9157°N 33.0039°E
- Country: Turkey
- Province: Çankırı
- District: Çerkeş
- Population (2021): 59
- Time zone: UTC+3 (TRT)

Afşar is a village in the Çerkeş District of Çankırı Province in Turkey. Its population is 59 (2021).
