= Pıtıreli, Bayramiç =

Village in Turkey

Pıtıreli
- Village
- Location in Turkey Pıtıreli (Marmara)
- Coordinates: 39°49′N 26°28′E
- Country: Turkey
- Province: Çanakkale
- District: Bayramiç
- Population (2021): 292
- Time zone: UTC+3 (TRT)

Pıtıreli is a village in the Bayramiç District of Çanakkale Province in Turkey. Its population is 292 (2021).
