= Kuşçayır, Bayramiç =

Village in Turkey

Kuşçayır
- Village
- Location in Turkey Kuşçayır (Marmara)
- Coordinates: 39°56′N 26°36′E
- Country: Turkey
- Province: Çanakkale
- District: Bayramiç
- Population (2021): 142
- Time zone: UTC+3 (TRT)

Kuşçayır is a village in the Bayramiç District of Çanakkale Province in Turkey. Its population is 142 (2021).
