= Akhasan, Çerkeş =

Village in Turkey

Akhasan
- Village
- Location in Turkey Akhasan (Turkey Central Anatolia)
- Coordinates: 40°46′16″N 32°48′18″E
- Country: Turkey
- Province: Çankırı
- District: Çerkeş
- Population (2021): 92
- Time zone: UTC+3 (TRT)

Akhasan is a village in the Çerkeş District of Çankırı Province in Turkey. Its population is 92 (2021).
