= Ahmetçeli, Bayramiç =

Village in Turkey

Ahmetçeli
- Village
- Location in Turkey Ahmetçeli (Marmara)
- Coordinates: 39.8151°N 26.5083°E
- Country: Turkey
- Province: Çanakkale
- District: Bayramiç
- Population (2021): 191
- Time zone: UTC+3 (TRT)

Ahmetçeli is a village in the Bayramiç District of Çanakkale Province in Turkey. Its population is 191 (2021).
