= Çayyüzü, Aydın =

Çayyüzü
- Neighbourhood
- Location in Turkey Çayyüzü (Turkey Aegean)
- Coordinates: 37°53′N 27°59′E
- Country: Turkey
- Province: Aydın
- District: Efeler
- Population (2022): 308
- Time zone: UTC+3 (TRT)

Çayyüzü is a neighbourhood in the municipality and district of Efeler, Aydın Province, Turkey. Its population is 308 (2022).
