= Bademli, Aydın =

Bademli
- Neighbourhood
- Location in Turkey Bademli (Turkey Aegean)
- Coordinates: 37.7429°N 27.9219°E
- Country: Turkey
- Province: Aydın
- District: Efeler
- Population (2022): 126
- Time zone: UTC+3 (TRT)

Bademli is a neighbourhood in the municipality and district of Efeler, Aydın Province, Turkey. Its population is 126 (2022).
