= Ayvaköy, Dodurga =

Village in Turkey

Ayvaköy
- Village
- Location in Turkey
- Coordinates: 40.8077°N 34.7277°E
- Country: Turkey
- Province: Çorum
- District: Dodurga
- Population (2022): 183
- Time zone: UTC+3 (TRT)

Ayvaköy is a village in the Dodurga District of Çorum Province in Turkey. Its population is 183 (2022).
