= Hacılar, Çerkeş =

Village in Turkey

Hacılar
- Village
- Location in Turkey Hacılar (Turkey Central Anatolia)
- Coordinates: 40.70344°N 32.97557°E
- Country: Turkey
- Province: Çankırı
- District: Çerkeş
- Population (2021): 143
- Time zone: UTC+3 (TRT)

Hacılar is a village in the Çerkeş District of Çankırı Province in Turkey. Its population is 143 (2021).
