= Yılmazköy, Aydın =

Yılmazköy
- Neighbourhood
- Location in Turkey Yılmazköy (Turkey Aegean)
- Coordinates: 37°51′25″N 27°53′24″E
- Country: Turkey
- Province: Aydın
- District: Efeler
- Population (2022): 1,014
- Time zone: UTC+3 (TRT)

Yılmazköy is a neighbourhood in the municipality and district of Efeler, Aydın Province, Turkey. Its population is 1,014 (2022). The village is inhabited by Tahtacı.
