= Kardeşköy, Aydın =

Kardeşköy
- Neighbourhood
- Location in Turkey Kardeşköy (Turkey Aegean)
- Coordinates: 37°50′46″N 27°46′12″E
- Country: Turkey
- Province: Aydın
- District: Efeler
- Population (2022): 2,703
- Time zone: UTC+3 (TRT)

Kardeşköy is a neighbourhood in the municipality and district of Efeler, Aydın Province, Turkey. Its population is 2,703 (2022).
