= Mimarsinan, Efeler =

Village in Turkey

Mimarsinan
- Neighbourhood
- Location in Turkey Mimarsinan (Turkey Aegean)
- Coordinates: 37°51′13″N 27°48′26″E
- Country: Turkey
- Province: Aydın
- District: Efeler
- Population (2024): 21,623
- Time zone: UTC+3 (TRT)

Mimarsinan is a neighbourhood in the municipality and district of Efeler, Aydın Province, Turkey. Its population is 21,623 (2024).
