= Kuyucular, Aydın =

Kuyucular
- Neighbourhood
- Location in Turkey Kuyucular (Turkey Aegean)
- Coordinates: 37°52′N 28°02′E
- Country: Turkey
- Province: Aydın
- District: Efeler
- Population (2022): 445
- Time zone: UTC+3 (TRT)

Kuyucular is a neighbourhood in the municipality and district of Efeler, Aydın Province, Turkey. Its population is 445 (2022).
