= Hasanefendi Ramazanpaşa, Efeler =

Village in Turkey

Hasanefendi Ramazanpaşa
- Neighbourhood
- Location in Turkey Hasanefendi Ramazanpaşa (Turkey Aegean)
- Coordinates: 37°50′59″N 27°50′24″E
- Country: Turkey
- Province: Aydın
- District: Efeler
- Population (2024): 5,198
- Time zone: UTC+3 (TRT)

Hasanefendi Ramazanpaşa is a neighbourhood in the municipality and district of Efeler, Aydın Province, Turkey. Its population is 5,198 (2024).
