= Çavuşköy, Bayramiç =

Village in Turkey

Çavuşköy
- Village
- Location in Turkey Çavuşköy (Marmara)
- Coordinates: 39.7558°N 26.4518°E
- Country: Turkey
- Province: Çanakkale
- District: Bayramiç
- Population (2021): 339
- Time zone: UTC+3 (TRT)

Çavuşköy is a village in the Bayramiç District of Çanakkale Province in Turkey. Its population is 339 (2021).
