= Ambarcık, Aydın =

Ambarcık
- Neighbourhood
- Location in Turkey Ambarcık (Turkey Aegean)
- Coordinates: 37.8976°N 27.8481°E
- Country: Turkey
- Province: Aydın
- District: Efeler
- Population (2022): 188
- Time zone: UTC+3 (TRT)

Ambarcık is a neighbourhood in the municipality and district of Efeler, Aydın Province, Turkey. Its population is 188 (2022).
