= Armutlu, Aydın =

Armutlu
- Neighbourhood
- Location in Turkey Armutlu (Turkey Aegean)
- Coordinates: 37.7981°N 27.9740°E
- Country: Turkey
- Province: Aydın
- District: Efeler
- Population (2022): 465
- Time zone: UTC+3 (TRT)

Armutlu is a neighbourhood in the municipality and district of Efeler, Aydın Province, Turkey. Its population is 465 (2022).
