= Kurtuluş, Efeler =

Village in Turkey

Coordinates: 37°50′31″N 27°50′32″E

Kurtuluş
- Neighbourhood
- Location in Turkey Kurtuluş (Turkey Aegean)
- Coordinates
- Country: Turkey
- Province: Aydın
- District: Efeler
- Population (2024): 10,231
- Time zone: UTC+3 (TRT)

Kurtuluş is a neighbourhood in the municipality and district of Efeler, Aydın Province, Turkey. Its population is 10,231 (2024).
