= Palamutoba, Bayramiç =

Village in Turkey

Palamutoba
- Village
- Location in Turkey Palamutoba (Marmara)
- Coordinates: 39°52′N 26°33′E
- Country: Turkey
- Province: Çanakkale
- District: Bayramiç
- Population (2021): 143
- Time zone: UTC+3 (TRT)

Palamutoba is a village in the Bayramiç District of Çanakkale Province in Turkey. Its population is 143 (2021).
