= Kızılcaköy, Aydın =

Kızılcaköy
- Neighbourhood
- Location in Turkey Kızılcaköy (Turkey Aegean)
- Coordinates: 37°52′12″N 27°46′16″E
- Country: Turkey
- Province: Aydın
- District: Efeler
- Population (2022): 1,013
- Time zone: UTC+3 (TRT)

Kızılcaköy is a neighbourhood in the municipality and district of Efeler, Aydın Province, Turkey. Its population is 1,013 (2022).
