= Zafer, Efeler =

Village in Turkey

Zafer
- Neighbourhood
- Location in Turkey Zafer (Turkey Aegean)
- Coordinates: 37°51′01″N 27°50′57″E
- Country: Turkey
- Province: Aydın
- District: Efeler
- Population (2024): 9,687
- Time zone: UTC+3 (TRT)

Zafer is a neighbourhood in the municipality and district of Efeler, Aydın Province, Turkey. Its population is 9,687 (2024).
