= Mehmetdedeobruğu, Dodurga =

Village in Turkey

Mehmetdedeobruğu
- Village
- Location in Turkey
- Coordinates: 40°47′N 34°48′E
- Country: Turkey
- Province: Çorum
- District: Dodurga
- Population (2022): 239
- Time zone: UTC+3 (TRT)

Mehmetdedeobruğu is a village in the Dodurga District of Çorum Province in Turkey. Its population is 239 (2022).
