= Toluklar, Bayramiç =

Village in Turkey

Toluklar
- Village
- Location in Turkey Toluklar (Marmara)
- Coordinates: 39°47′15″N 26°50′13″E
- Country: Turkey
- Province: Çanakkale
- District: Bayramiç
- Population (2021): 62
- Time zone: UTC+3 (TRT)

Toluklar is a village in the Bayramiç District of Çanakkale Province in Turkey. Its population is 62 (2021).
