= Beymelik, Çerkeş =

Village in Turkey

Beymelik
- Village
- Location in Turkey Beymelik (Turkey Central Anatolia)
- Coordinates: 40°56′N 32°48′E
- Country: Turkey
- Province: Çankırı
- District: Çerkeş
- Population (2021): 75
- Time zone: UTC+3 (TRT)

Beymelik is a village in the Çerkeş District of Çankırı Province in Turkey. Its population is 75 (2021).
