= Saçaklı, Bayramiç =

Village in Turkey

Saçaklı
- Village
- Location in Turkey Saçaklı (Marmara)
- Coordinates: 39.8297°N 26.5405°E
- Country: Turkey
- Province: Çanakkale
- District: Bayramiç
- Population (2021): 111
- Time zone: UTC+3 (TRT)

Saçaklı is a village in the Bayramiç District of Çanakkale Province in Turkey. Its population is 111 (2021).
