= Kuzören, Çerkeş =

Village in Turkey

Kuzören
- Village
- Country: Turkey
- Province: Çankırı
- District: Çerkeş
- Population (2021): 28
- Time zone: UTC+3 (TRT)

Kuzören is a village in the Çerkeş District of Çankırı Province in Turkey. Its population is 28 (2021).
