= Bayramiç District =

District of Çanakkale Province, Turkey

- District
- Map showing Bayramiç District in Çanakkale Province

- Location in Turkey Bayramiç District (Marmara)
- Coordinates: 39°49′N 26°37′E
- Country: Turkey
- Province: Çanakkale
- Seat: Bayramiç

Government
  - Kaymakam: Alper Taş
- Area: 1,204 km^{2} (465 sq mi)
- Population (2021): 29,136
  - Density: 24/km^{2} (63/sq mi)
- Time zone: UTC+3 (TRT)
- Website: www.bayramic.gov.tr

Bayramiç District is a district of the Çanakkale Province of Turkey. Its seat is the town of Bayramiç. Its area is 1,204 km^{2}, and its population is 29,136 (2021).

== Composition ==
There is one municipality in Bayramiç District:

- Bayramiç

There are 75 villages in Bayramiç District:

- Ağaçköy
- Ahmetçeli
- Akpınar
- Alakeçi
- Alikabaklar
- Aşağışapcı
- Aşağışevik
- Bekirler
- Beşik
- Bezirganlar
- Bıyıklı
- Çalıdağı
- Çalıobaakçakıl
- Çatalçam
- Çavuşköy
- Çavuşlu
- Cazgirler
- Çiftlikköy
- Çırpılar
- Dağahmetçe
- Dağoba
- Daloba
- Doğancı
- Evciler
- Gedik
- Gökçeiçi
- Güzeltepe
- Hacıbekirler
- Hacıdervişler
- Hacıköy
- Işıkeli
- Karaibrahimler
- Karaköy
- Karıncalı
- Kaykılar
- Korucak
- Köseler
- Koşuburnutürkmenleri
- Köylü
- Külcüler
- Kurşunlu
- Kuşçayır
- Kutluoba
- Mollahasanlar
- Muratlar
- Nebiler
- Örenli
- Osmaniye
- Palamutoba
- Pınarbaşı
- Pıtıreli
- Saçaklı
- Saraycık
- Sarıdüz
- Sarıot
- Serhat
- Söğütgediği
- Toluklar
- Tongurlu
- Tülüler
- Türkmenli
- Üçyol
- Üzümlü
- Yahşieli
- Yanıklar
- Yassıbağ
- Yaylacık
- Yenice
- Yeniköy
- Yeşilköy
- Yiğitaliler
- Yukarışapçı
- Yukarışevik
- Zerdalilik
- Zeytinli
