= Karahayıt, Aydın =

Karahayıt
- Neighbourhood
- Location in Turkey Karahayıt (Turkey Aegean)
- Coordinates: 37.794617°N 28.00721°E
- Country: Turkey
- Province: Aydın
- District: Efeler
- Population (2022): 499
- Time zone: UTC+3 (TRT)

Karahayıt is a neighbourhood in the municipality and district of Efeler, Aydın Province, Turkey. Its population is 499 (2022).
