= Meşrutiyet, Efeler =

Village in Turkey

Meşrutiyet
- Neighbourhood
- Location in Turkey Meşrutiyet (Turkey Aegean)
- Coordinates: 37°51′4″N 27°49′56″E
- Country: Turkey
- Province: Aydın
- District: Efeler
- Population (2024): 13,544
- Time zone: UTC+3 (TRT)

Meşrutiyet is a neighbourhood in the municipality and district of Efeler, Aydın Province, Turkey. Its population is 13,544 (2024).
