= Serhat, Bayramiç =

Village in Turkey

Serhat
- Village
- Location in Turkey Serhat (Marmara)
- Coordinates: 39°44′N 26°42′E
- Country: Turkey
- Province: Çanakkale
- District: Bayramiç
- Population (2021): 363
- Time zone: UTC+3 (TRT)

Serhat is a village in the Bayramiç District of Çanakkale Province in Turkey. Its population is 363 (2021).
