= Umurlu, Aydın =

Umurlu
- Neighbourhood
- Location in Turkey Umurlu (Turkey Aegean)
- Coordinates: 37°51′N 27°58′E
- Country: Turkey
- Province: Aydın
- District: Efeler
- Elevation: 80 m (260 ft)
- Population (2022): 11,953
- Time zone: UTC+3 (TRT)
- Postal code: 09630
- Area code: 0256

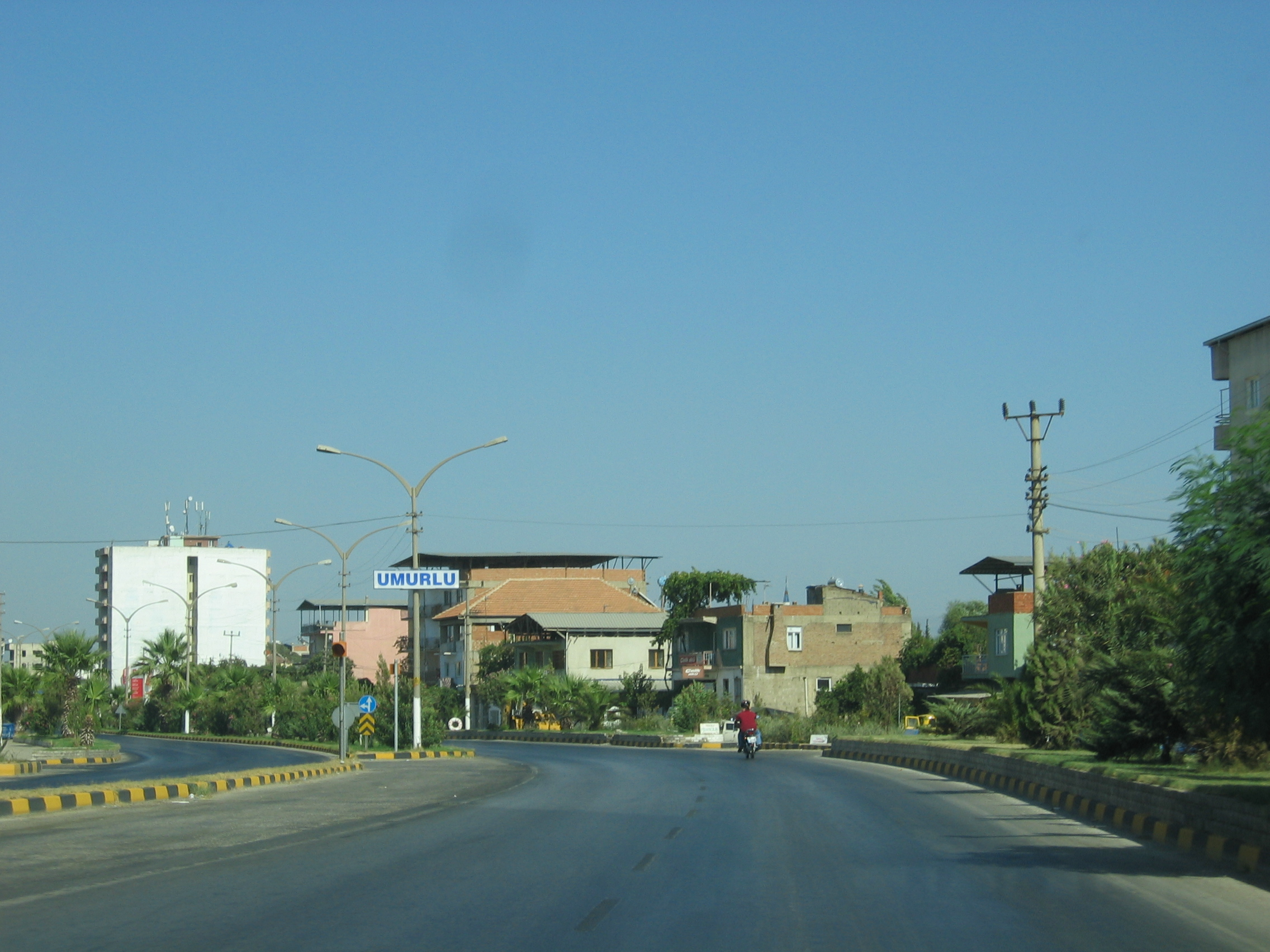
Panorama of Urmulu

Umurlu is a neighbourhood of the municipality and district of Efeler, Aydın Province, Turkey. Its population is 11,953 (2022). Before the 2013 reorganisation, it was a town (belde). The town is located 12 kilometres (7.5 mi) east of Aydın.
