= Kadıözü, Çerkeş =

Village in Turkey

Kadıözü
- Village
- Location in Turkey Kadıözü (Turkey Central Anatolia)
- Coordinates: 40°48′51″N 32°58′34″E
- Country: Turkey
- Province: Çankırı
- District: Çerkeş
- Population (2021): 121
- Time zone: UTC+3 (TRT)

Kadıözü is a village in the Çerkeş District of Çankırı Province in Turkey. Its population is 121 (2021).
