= Hacıköy, Bayramiç =

Village in Turkey

Hacıköy
- Village
- Location in Turkey Hacıköy (Marmara)
- Coordinates: 39.8930°N 26.6258°E
- Country: Turkey
- Province: Çanakkale
- District: Bayramiç
- Population (2021): 53
- Time zone: UTC+3 (TRT)

Hacıköy is a village in the Bayramiç District of Çanakkale Province in Turkey. Its population is 53 (2021).
