= Kozalaklı, Aydın =

Kozalaklı
- Neighbourhood
- Location in Turkey Kozalaklı (Turkey Aegean)
- Coordinates: 37°48′N 27°59′E
- Country: Turkey
- Province: Aydın
- District: Efeler
- Population (2022): 477
- Time zone: UTC+3 (TRT)

Kozalaklı is a neighbourhood in the municipality and district of Efeler, Aydın Province, Turkey. Its population is 477 (2022).
