= Alatepe, Aydın =

Alatepe
- Neighbourhood
- Location in Turkey Alatepe (Turkey Aegean)
- Coordinates: 37.9044°N 27.8231°E
- Country: Turkey
- Province: Aydın
- District: Efeler
- Population (2022): 151
- Time zone: UTC+3 (TRT)

Alatepe is a neighbourhood in the municipality and district of Efeler, Aydın Province, Turkey. Its population is 151 (2022).
