= Yağcılar, Aydın =

Yağcılar
- Neighbourhood
- Location in Turkey Yağcılar (Turkey Aegean)
- Coordinates: 37°45′58″N 27°58′59″E
- Country: Turkey
- Province: Aydın
- District: Efeler
- Population (2022): 36
- Time zone: UTC+3 (TRT)

Yağcılar is a neighbourhood in the municipality and district of Efeler, Aydın Province, Turkey. Its population is 36 (2022).
