= Zeybek, Efeler =

Village in Turkey

Zeybek
- Neighbourhood
- Location in Turkey Zeybek (Turkey Aegean)
- Coordinates: 37°50′35″N 27°48′55″E
- Country: Turkey
- Province: Aydın
- District: Efeler
- Population (2024): 8,064
- Time zone: UTC+3 (TRT)

Zeybek is a neighbourhood in the municipality and district of Efeler, Aydın Province, Turkey. Its population is 8,064 (2024).
