= Osman Yozgatlı, Efeler =

Village in Turkey

Osman Yozgatlı
- Neighbourhood
- Location in Turkey Osman Yozgatlı (Turkey Aegean)
- Coordinates: 37°49′44″N 27°49′48″E
- Country: Turkey
- Province: Aydın
- District: Efeler
- Population (2024): 18,407
- Time zone: UTC+3 (TRT)

Osman Yozgatlı is a neighbourhood in the municipality and district of Efeler, Aydın Province, Turkey. Its population is 18,407 (2024).
