= Yaylacık, Bayramiç =

Village in Turkey

Yaylacık
- Village
- Location in Turkey Yaylacık (Marmara)
- Coordinates: 39°52′23″N 26°44′31″E
- Country: Turkey
- Province: Çanakkale
- District: Bayramiç
- Population (2021): 28
- Time zone: UTC+3 (TRT)

Yaylacık is a village in the Bayramiç District of Çanakkale Province in Turkey. Its population is 28 (2021).
