= Çalıdağı, Bayramiç =

Village in Turkey

Çalıdağı
- Village
- Location in Turkey Çalıdağı (Marmara)
- Coordinates: 39°45′N 26°34′E
- Country: Turkey
- Province: Çanakkale
- District: Bayramiç
- Population (2021): 85
- Time zone: UTC+3 (TRT)

Çalıdağı is a village in the Bayramiç District of Çanakkale Province in Turkey. Its population is 85 (2021).
