= Akbaş, Çerkeş =

Village in Turkey

Akbaş
- Village
- Location in Turkey Akbaş (Turkey Central Anatolia)
- Coordinates: 40.8976°N 32.8300°E
- Country: Turkey
- Province: Çankırı
- District: Çerkeş
- Population (2021): 51
- Time zone: UTC+3 (TRT)

Akbaş is a village in the Çerkeş District of Çankırı Province in Turkey. Its population is 51 (2021).
