= Işıklı, Aydın =

Işıklı
- Neighbourhood
- Location in Turkey Işıklı (Turkey Aegean)
- Coordinates: 37°50′06″N 27°48′11″E
- Country: Turkey
- Province: Aydın
- District: Efeler
- Population (2022): 4,830
- Time zone: UTC+3 (TRT)

Işıklı is a neighbourhood in the municipality and district of Efeler, Aydın Province, Turkey. Its population is 4,830 (2022).
