= Balıkköy, Aydın =

Balıkköy
- Neighbourhood
- Location in Turkey Balıkköy (Turkey Aegean)
- Coordinates: 37.9105°N 27.8120°E
- Country: Turkey
- Province: Aydın
- District: Efeler
- Population (2022): 158
- Time zone: UTC+3 (TRT)

Balıkköy is a neighbourhood in the municipality and district of Efeler, Aydın Province, Turkey. Its population is 158 (2022).
