= Mollahasanlar, Bayramiç =

Village in Turkey

Mollahasanlar
- Village
- Location in Turkey Mollahasanlar (Marmara)
- Coordinates: 39°47′35″N 26°43′05″E
- Country: Turkey
- Province: Çanakkale
- District: Bayramiç
- Population (2021): 256
- Time zone: UTC+3 (TRT)

Mollahasanlar is a village in the Bayramiç District of Çanakkale Province in Turkey. Its population is 256 (2021).
