= Gölcük, Aydın =

Gölcük
- Neighbourhood
- Location in Turkey Gölcük (Turkey Aegean)
- Coordinates: 37.899°N 27.920°E
- Country: Turkey
- Province: Aydın
- District: Efeler
- Population (2022): 118
- Time zone: UTC+3 (TRT)

Gölcük is a neighborhood in the municipality and district of Efeler, Aydın Province, Turkey. Its population is 118 (2022).
