= Karacahüyük, Çerkeş =

Village in Turkey

Karacahüyük
- Village
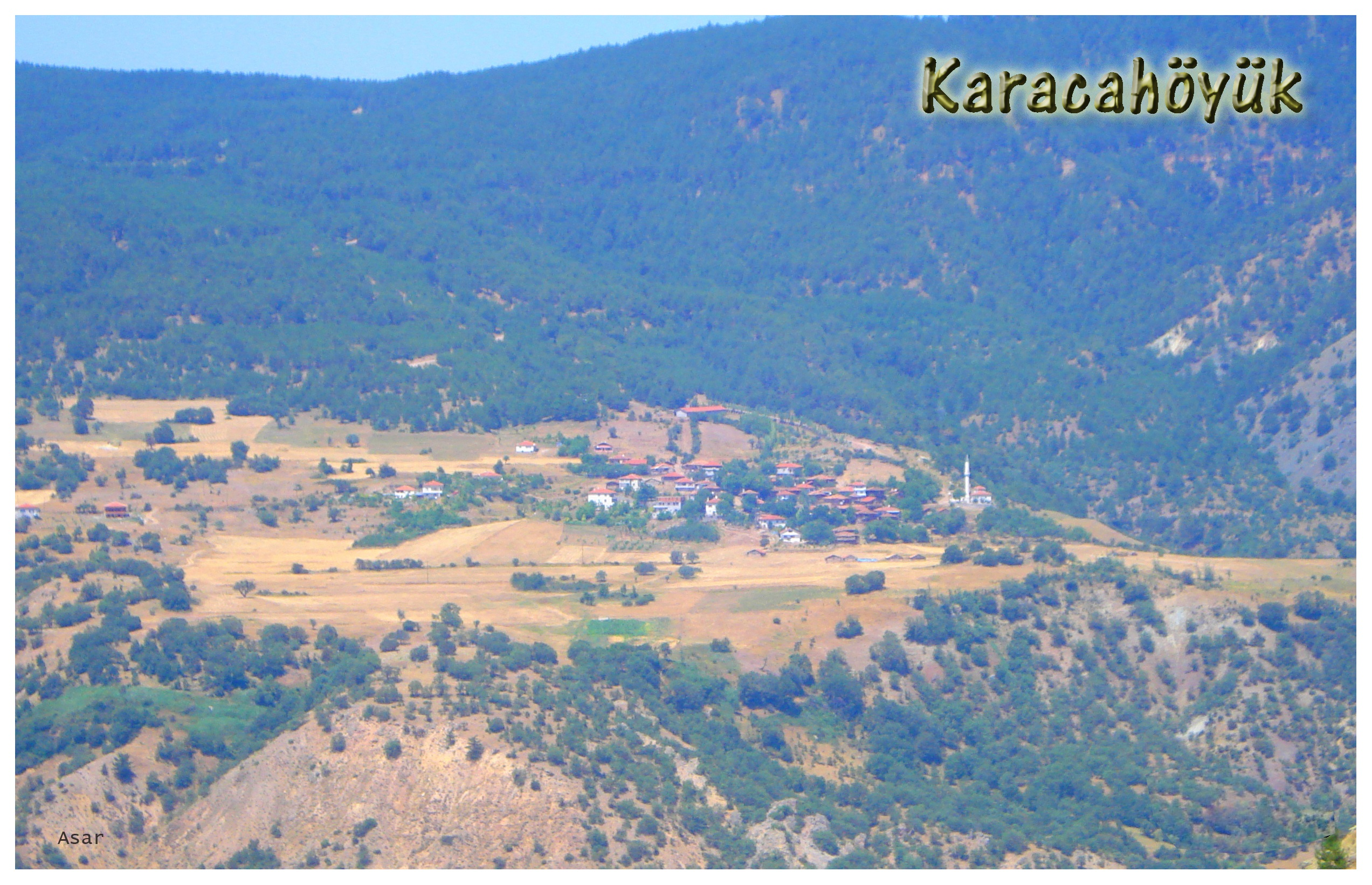

- Location within Turkey Location within Turkey Central Anatolia
- Country: Turkey
- Province: Çankırı
- District: Çerkeş
- Population (2021): 32
- Time zone: UTC+3 (TRT)

Karacahüyük is a village in the Çerkeş District of Çankırı Province in Turkey. Its population was 32 in 2021.
