= Çalıobaakçakıl, Bayramiç =

Village in Turkey

Çalıobaakçakıl
- Village
- Location in Turkey Çalıobaakçakıl (Marmara)
- Coordinates: 39.7708°N 26.6994°E
- Country: Turkey
- Province: Çanakkale
- District: Bayramiç
- Population (2021): 178
- Time zone: UTC+3 (TRT)

Çalıobaakçakıl is a village in the Bayramiç District of Çanakkale Province in Turkey. Its population is 178 (2021).
