= Girne, Efeler =

Village in Turkey

Girne
- Neighbourhood
- Location in Turkey Girne (Turkey Aegean)
- Coordinates: 37°51′08″N 27°49′24″E
- Country: Turkey
- Province: Aydın
- District: Efeler
- Population (2024): 23,501
- Time zone: UTC+3 (TRT)

Girne is a neighbourhood in the municipality and district of Efeler, Aydın Province, Turkey. Its population is 23,501 (2024).
