= Yukarışevik, Bayramiç =

Village in Turkey

Yukarışevik
- Village
- Location in Turkey Yukarışevik (Marmara)
- Coordinates: 39.8997°N 26.6644°E
- Country: Turkey
- Province: Çanakkale
- District: Bayramiç
- Population (2021): 31
- Time zone: UTC+3 (TRT)

Yukarışevik is a village in the Bayramiç District of Çanakkale Province in Turkey. Its population is 31 (2021).
