= Çalcıören, Çerkeş =

Village in Turkey

Çalcıören
- Village
- Location within Turkey Location within Turkey Central Anatolia
- Coordinates: 40.8652°N 32.9575°E
- Country: Turkey
- Province: Çankırı
- District: Çerkeş
- Population (2021): 38
- Time zone: UTC+3 (TRT)

Çalcıören is a village in the Çerkeş District of Çankırı Province in Turkey. Its population is 38 (2021).
