= Alanlı, Aydın =

Alanlı
- Neighbourhood
- Location in Turkey Alanlı (Turkey Aegean)
- Coordinates: 37.7987°N 28.1095°E
- Country: Turkey
- Province: Aydın
- District: Efeler
- Population (2022): 436
- Time zone: UTC+3 (TRT)

Alanlı is a neighbourhood in the municipality and district of Efeler, Aydın Province, Turkey. Its population is 436 (2022).
