= Tongurlu, Bayramiç =

Village in Turkey

Tongurlu
- Village
- Location in Turkey Tongurlu (Marmara)
- Coordinates: 39°50′N 26°49′E
- Country: Turkey
- Province: Çanakkale
- District: Bayramiç
- Population (2021): 218
- Time zone: UTC+3 (TRT)

Tongurlu is a village in the Bayramiç District of Çanakkale Province in Turkey. Its population is 218 (2021).
