= Efeler, Efeler =

Village in Turkey

Efeler
- Neighbourhood
- Location in Turkey Efeler (Turkey Aegean)
- Coordinates: 37°50′19″N 27°49′36″E
- Country: Turkey
- Province: Aydın
- District: Efeler
- Population (2024): 22,237
- Time zone: UTC+3 (TRT)

Efeler is a neighbourhood in the municipality and district of Efeler, Aydın Province, Turkey. Its population is 22,237 (2024).
