= Cazgirler, Bayramiç =

Village in Turkey

Cazgirler
- Village
- Location in Turkey Cazgirler (Marmara)
- Coordinates: 39°58′44″N 26°44′52″E
- Country: Turkey
- Province: Çanakkale
- District: Bayramiç
- Population (2021): 61
- Time zone: UTC+3 (TRT)

Cazgirler is a village in the Bayramiç District of Çanakkale Province in Turkey. Its population is 61 (2021).
