= Bozoğlu, Çerkeş =

Village in Turkey

Bozoğlu
- Village
- Location in Turkey Bozoğlu (Turkey Central Anatolia)
- Coordinates: 40°47′N 32°55′E
- Country: Turkey
- Province: Çankırı
- District: Çerkeş
- Population (2021): 147
- Time zone: UTC+3 (TRT)

Bozoğlu is a village in the Çerkeş District of Çankırı Province in Turkey. Its population is 147 (2021).
