= Kemer, Efeler =

Village in Turkey

Kemer
- Neighbourhood
- Location in Turkey Kemer (Turkey Aegean)
- Coordinates: 37°51′34″N 27°49′33″E
- Country: Turkey
- Province: Aydın
- District: Efeler
- Population (2024): 9,613
- Time zone: UTC+3 (TRT)

Kemer is a neighbourhood in the municipality and district of Efeler, Aydın Province, Turkey. Its population is 9,613 (2024).
