= Efeler =

- District and municipality
- Logo

- Map showing Efeler District in Aydın Province

- Location in Turkey Efeler (Turkey Aegean)
- Coordinates: 37°51′N 27°51′E
- Country: Turkey
- Province: Aydın

Government
  - Mayor: Anıl Yetişkin (CHP)
- Area: 124 km^{2} (48 sq mi)
- Elevation: 160 m (520 ft)
- Population (2022): 303,772
  - Density: 2,450/km^{2} (6,340/sq mi)
- Time zone: UTC+3 (TRT)
- Postal code: 09000
- Area code: 0256
- Website: www.efeler.bel.tr

Efeler is a municipality and district of Aydın Province, Turkey. Its area is 124 km^{2}, and its population is 303,772 (2022). The district was established as a part of the 2013 local government reorganisation from the former central district of Aydın. The name Aydın was reserved for the metropolitan municipality.

Efeler is the plural of the title Efe and it refers to the irregular soldiers from the Aegean Region who fought during the Turkish War of Independence.

== Composition ==
There are 83 neighbourhoods in Efeler District:

- Adnan Menderes
- Alanlı
- Alatepe
- Ambarcık
- Armutlu
- Aşağıkayacık
- Ata
- Bademli
- Balıkköy
- Baltaköy
- Böcek
- Çayyüzü
- Çeştepe
- Çiftlikköy
- Cuma
- Cumhuriyet
- Dağeymiri
- Dalama
- Danişment
- Dereköy
- Doğan
- Efeler
- Eğrikavak
- Emirdoğan
- Fatih
- Girne
- Gödrenli
- Gölcük
- Gölhisar
- Gözpınar
- Güzelhisar
- Hasanefendi Ramazanpaşa
- Horozköy
- Ilıcabaşı
- İlyasdere
- İmamköy
- Işıklı
- İstiklal
- Kadıköy
- Kalfaköy
- Karahayıt
- Karaköy
- Kardeşköy
- Kemer
- Kenger
- Kırıklar
- Kızılcaköy
- Kocagür
- Konuklu
- Köprülü Veysipaşa
- Kozalaklı
- Kuloğullar
- Kurtuluş
- Kuyucular
- Kuyulu
- Meşrutiyet
- Mesudiye
- Mesutlu
- Mimarsinan
- Musluca
- Orta
- Ortaköy
- Osman Yozgatlı
- Ovaeymir
- Pınardere
- Şahnalı
- Savrandere
- Serçeköy
- Şevketiye
- Sıralılar
- Tepecik
- Tepeköy
- Terziler
- Umurlu
- Yağcılar
- Yedieylül
- Yeniköy
- Yeniköy (Dalama)
- Yılmazköy
- Yukarıkayacık
- Zafer
- Zeybek
- Zeytinköy

== Education ==
There are 20 kindergartens, 50 primary schools, 34 secondary schools, 24 high schools, 1 public education center, 1 vocational training center, 1 science and art center, and 1 counseling and research center affiliated with the Ministry of National Education in the district.
