= Mehmetdedetekkesi, Dodurga =

Village in Turkey

Mehmetdedetekkesi
- Village
- Location in Turkey
- Coordinates: 40°46′48″N 34°45′32″E
- Country: Turkey
- Province: Çorum
- District: Dodurga
- Population (2022): 160
- Time zone: UTC+3 (TRT)

Mehmetdedetekkesi is a village in the Dodurga District of Çorum Province in Turkey. Its population is 160 (2022).
