= Danişment, Aydın =

Danişment
- Neighbourhood
- Location in Turkey Danişment (Turkey Aegean)
- Coordinates: 37.883963°N 27.839352°E
- Country: Turkey
- Province: Aydın
- District: Efeler
- Population (2022): 185
- Time zone: UTC+3 (TRT)

Danişment is a neighbourhood in the municipality and district of Efeler, Aydın Province, Turkey. Its population is 185 (2022).
