= Saçak, Çerkeş =

Village in Turkey

Saçak
- Municipality
- Location in Turkey Saçak (Turkey Central Anatolia)
- Coordinates: 40°46′52″N 33°0′55″E
- Country: Turkey
- Province: Çankırı
- District: Çerkeş
- Population (2021): 2,520
- Time zone: UTC+3 (TRT)

Saçak is a town (belde) in the Çerkeş District, Çankırı Province, Turkey. Its population is 2,520 (2021).
