= Kutluoba, Bayramiç =

Village in Turkey

Kutluoba
- Village
- Location in Turkey Kutluoba (Marmara)
- Coordinates: 39°47′N 26°35′E
- Country: Turkey
- Province: Çanakkale
- District: Bayramiç
- Population (2021): 178
- Time zone: UTC+3 (TRT)

Kutluoba is a village in the Bayramiç District of Çanakkale Province in Turkey. Its population is 178 (2021).
