= Köylü, Bayramiç =

Village in Turkey

Köylü
- Village
- Location in Turkey Köylü (Marmara)
- Coordinates: 39.8708°N 26.7197°E
- Country: Turkey
- Province: Çanakkale
- District: Bayramiç
- Population (2021): 67
- Time zone: UTC+3 (TRT)

Köylü is a village in the Bayramiç District of Çanakkale Province in Turkey. Its population is 67 (2021).
