= Şahnalı, Aydın =

Şahnalı
- Neighbourhood
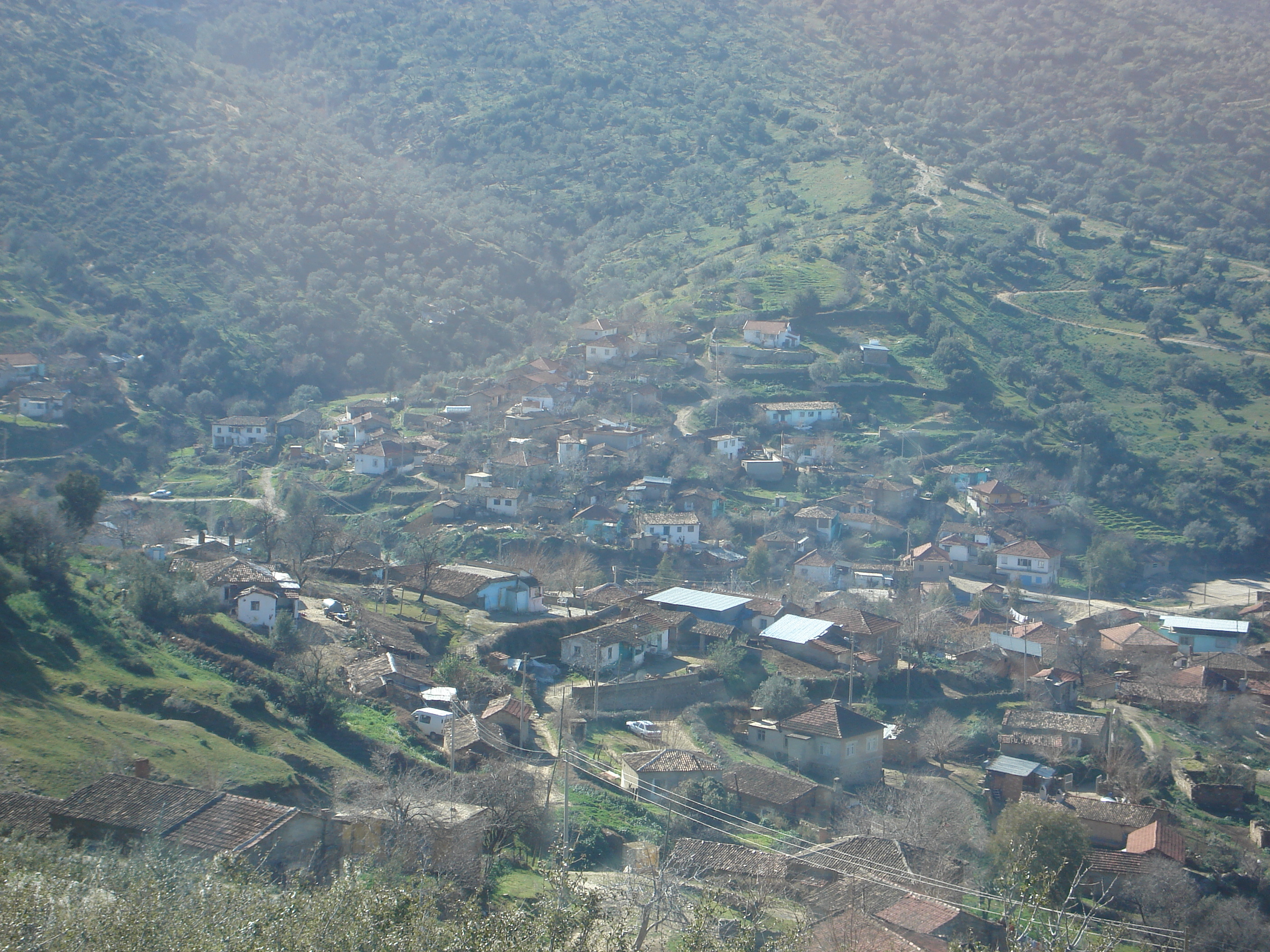

- Location within Turkey Location within Turkey Aegean
- Coordinates: 37°47′N 27°57′E
- Country: Turkey
- Province: Aydın
- District: Efeler
- Population (2022): 621
- Time zone: UTC+3 (TRT)

Şahnalı is a neighbourhood in the municipality and district of Efeler, Aydın Province, Turkey. Its population is 621 (2022).
