= Sarıdüz, Bayramiç =

Village in Turkey

Sarıdüz
- Village
- Location in Turkey Sarıdüz (Marmara)
- Coordinates: 39°43′2″N 26°30′4″E
- Country: Turkey
- Province: Çanakkale
- District: Bayramiç
- Population (2021): 213
- Time zone: UTC+3 (TRT)

Sarıdüz is a village in the Bayramiç District of Çanakkale Province in Turkey. Its population is 213 (2021).
