= Çeştepe =

Çeştepe Çerkezköy
- Neighbourhood
- Location in Turkey Çeştepe (Turkey Aegean)
- Coordinates: 37°50′N 27°51′E
- Country: Turkey
- Province: Aydın
- District: Efeler
- Elevation: 80 m (260 ft)
- Population (2022): 5,787
- Time zone: UTC+3 (TRT)
- Postal code: 09010
- Area code: 0256

Çeştepe is a neighbourhood of the municipality and district of Efeler, Aydın Province, Turkey. Its population is 5,787 (2022). Before the 2013 reorganisation, it was a town (belde). It is almost merged to Aydın city center. According to the mayor's webpage, the town was founded by Circassian refugees from the Balkans and the Caucasus during the last years of the Ottoman Empire. Çeştepe was declared a seat of township in 1992.
