= Ilıcabaşı, Efeler =

Village in Turkey

Ilıcabaşı
- Neighbourhood
- Location in Turkey Ilıcabaşı (Turkey Aegean)
- Coordinates: 37°50′53″N 27°52′05″E
- Country: Turkey
- Province: Aydın
- District: Efeler
- Population (2022): 1,395
- Time zone: UTC+3 (TRT)

Ilıcabaşı is a neighbourhood in the municipality and district of Efeler, Aydın Province, Turkey. Its population was 1,395 in 2022.
