= Karaköy, Bayramiç =

Village in Turkey

Karaköy
- Village
- Location within Turkey Location within Marmara
- Country: Turkey
- Province: Çanakkale
- District: Bayramiç
- Population (2021): 347
- Time zone: UTC+3 (TRT)

Karaköy is a village in the Bayramiç District of Çanakkale Province in Turkey. Its population is 347 (2021).
