= Örenköy, Çerkeş =

Village in Turkey

Örenköy
- Village
- Country: Turkey
- Province: Çankırı
- District: Çerkeş
- Population (2021): 270
- Time zone: UTC+3 (TRT)

Örenköy is a village in the Çerkeş District of Çankırı Province in Turkey. Its population is 270 (2021). Ethnicity of the people in the village is Turkic.
