= Şeyhdoğan, Çerkeş =

Village in Turkey

Şeyhdoğan
- Village
- Location in Turkey Şeyhdoğan (Turkey Central Anatolia)
- Coordinates: 40°51′N 32°54′E
- Country: Turkey
- Province: Çankırı
- District: Çerkeş
- Population (2021): 158
- Time zone: UTC+3 (TRT)

Şeyhdoğan is a village in the Çerkeş District of Çankırı Province in Turkey. Its population is 158 (2021).
