= Savrandere, Aydın =

Savrandere
- Neighbourhood
- Location in Turkey Savrandere (Turkey Aegean)
- Coordinates: 37°44′N 27°52′E
- Country: Turkey
- Province: Aydın
- District: Efeler
- Population (2022): 347
- Time zone: UTC+3 (TRT)

Savrandere is a neighbourhood in the municipality and district of Efeler, Aydın Province, Turkey. Its population is 347 (2022).
