= Çiftlikköy, Aydın =

Çiftlikköy
- Neighbourhood
- Location in Turkey Çiftlikköy (Turkey Aegean)
- Coordinates: 37.76219°N 27.843353°E
- Country: Turkey
- Province: Aydın
- District: Efeler
- Population (2022): 192
- Time zone: UTC+3 (TRT)

Çiftlikköy is a neighbourhood in the municipality and district of Efeler, Aydın Province, Turkey. Its population is 192 (2022).
