= Külcüler, Bayramiç =

Village in Turkey

Külcüler
- Village
- Location in Turkey Külcüler (Marmara)
- Coordinates: 39°48′N 26°48′E
- Country: Turkey
- Province: Çanakkale
- District: Bayramiç
- Population (2021): 225
- Time zone: UTC+3 (TRT)

Külcüler is a village in the Bayramiç District of Çanakkale Province in Turkey. Its population is 225 (2021).
