= Dağeymiri, Aydın =

Dağeymiri
- Neighbourhood
- Location in Turkey Dağeymiri (Turkey Aegean)
- Coordinates: 37°54′N 27°51′E
- Country: Turkey
- Province: Aydın
- District: Efeler
- Population (2022): 429
- Time zone: UTC+3 (TRT)

Dağeymiri is a neighbourhood in the municipality and district of Efeler, Aydın Province, Turkey. Its population is 429 (2022).
