= Aşağışapcı, Bayramiç =

Village in Turkey

Aşağışapcı
- Village
- Location in Turkey Aşağışapcı (Marmara)
- Coordinates: 39°57′33″N 26°41′34″E
- Country: Turkey
- Province: Çanakkale
- District: Bayramiç
- Population (2021): 69
- Time zone: UTC+3 (TRT)

Aşağışapcı is a village in the Bayramiç District of Çanakkale Province in Turkey. Its population is 69 (2021).
