= Bekirler, Bayramiç =

Village in Turkey

Bekirler
- Village
- Location in Turkey Bekirler (Marmara)
- Coordinates: 39.9349°N 26.6947°E
- Country: Turkey
- Province: Çanakkale
- District: Bayramiç
- Population (2021): 64
- Time zone: UTC+3 (TRT)

Bekirler is a village in the Bayramiç District of Çanakkale Province in Turkey. Its population is 64 (2021).
