= Osmaniye, Bayramiç =

Village in Turkey

Osmaniye
- Village
- Country: Turkey
- Province: Çanakkale
- District: Bayramiç
- Population (2021): 22
- Time zone: UTC+3 (TRT)

Osmaniye is a village in the Bayramiç District of Çanakkale Province in Turkey. Its population is 22 (2021).
