= Berkköy, Dodurga =

Village in Turkey

Berkköy
- Village
- Location in Turkey
- Coordinates: 40.8301°N 34.8334°E
- Country: Turkey
- Province: Çorum
- District: Dodurga
- Population (2022): 231
- Time zone: UTC+3 (TRT)

Berkköy is a village in the Dodurga District of Çorum Province in Turkey. Its population is 231 (2022).
