= Çiftlik, Marmaris =

Çiftlik
- Location in Turkey
- Coordinates: 36°43′08″N 28°14′29″E
- Country: Turkey
- Province: Muğla
- District: Marmaris
- Area: Bozburun Peninsula

Population (2011)
  - Total: 560
- Time zone: UTC+3 (TRT)

Çiftlik is a beach settlement in the municipality and district of Marmaris, Muğla Province, Turkey. It is a popular first-day stay for yachts sailing west from Marmaris, with restaurants and a hotel.
