= Örenli, Çerkeş =

Village in Turkey

Örenli
- Village
- Location in Turkey Örenli (Turkey Central Anatolia)
- Coordinates: 40.8758°N 32.7569°E
- Country: Turkey
- Province: Çankırı
- District: Çerkeş
- Population (2021): 151
- Time zone: UTC+3 (TRT)

Örenli is a village in the Çerkeş District of Çankırı Province in Turkey. Its population is 151 (2021).
