= Beşik, Bayramiç =

Village in Turkey

Beşik
- Village
- Location in Turkey Beşik (Marmara)
- Coordinates: 39.7376°N 26.6935°E
- Country: Turkey
- Province: Çanakkale
- District: Bayramiç
- Population (2021): 191
- Time zone: UTC+3 (TRT)

Beşik is a village in the Bayramiç District of Çanakkale Province in Turkey. Its population is 191 (2021).
