= Çiftlikköy, Bayramiç =

Village in Turkey

Çiftlikköy
- Village
- Country: Turkey
- Province: Çanakkale
- District: Bayramiç
- Population (2021): 65
- Time zone: UTC+3 (TRT)

Çiftlikköy (also: Çiftlik) is a village in the Bayramiç District of Çanakkale Province in Turkey. Its population is 65 (2021).
