= Yassıbağ, Bayramiç =

Village in Turkey

Yassıbağ
- Village
- Location in Turkey Yassıbağ (Marmara)
- Coordinates: 39°44′45″N 26°40′31″E
- Country: Turkey
- Province: Çanakkale
- District: Bayramiç
- Population (2021): 400
- Time zone: UTC+3 (TRT)

Yassıbağ is a village in the Bayramiç District of Çanakkale Province in Turkey. Its population is 400 (2021).
