= Şevketiye, Aydın =

Şevketiye
- Neighbourhood
- Location in Turkey Şevketiye (Turkey Aegean)
- Coordinates: 37.831597°N 27.79056°E
- Country: Turkey
- Province: Aydın
- District: Efeler
- Population (2022): 258
- Time zone: UTC+3 (TRT)

Şevketiye is a neighbourhood in the municipality and district of Efeler, Aydın Province, Turkey. Its population is 258 (2022).
