= Belkavak, Çerkeş =

Village in Turkey

Belkavak
- Village
- Location in Turkey Belkavak (Turkey Central Anatolia)
- Coordinates: 40.8632°N 32.7529°E
- Country: Turkey
- Province: Çankırı
- District: Çerkeş
- Population (2021): 90
- Time zone: UTC+3 (TRT)

Belkavak is a village in the Çerkeş District of Çankırı Province in Turkey. Its population is 90 (2021).
