= Gökçeler Canyon =

- Gökçeler Kanyonu
- Location within Turkey
- Length: about 8 km (5.0 mi)

Geography
- Location: Gökçeler-Karacahisar, Milas, Muğla Province, Turkey
- Coordinates: 37°11′04″N 27°45′30″E
- Interactive map of Gökçeler Canyon

Gökçeler Canyon (Turkish: Gökçeler Kanyonu) is a canyon in Muğla Province, southwestern Turkey.

The canyon is located between the villages Gökçeler and Karacahisar in Milas district of Muğla Province. It is about 8 km (5.0 mi) long. Değirmen Creek (literally Mill Creek), also known as Hamzabey Creek, runs through the canyon, which forms waterfalls and ponds in different size along its course. It is believed that there were about 14 flour mills on the creek in the canyon in the past, remains of three mills are still existent. There are about 30 large and small caves in the canyon, with İncirliin Cave and Çatal Cave being the most significant. While İncirliin Cave is already open to the public, Çatal Cave awaits scientific exploration. Archaeological finds were discovered in the canyon.

Flora of the canyon consists of centuries-old olive (Olea europaea), walnut (Juglans), common fig (Ficus carica), plane tree (Platanus), laurel (Laurus), red pine (Pinus resinosa) and diverse shrub species. Fauna observed in the canyon area are Indian crested porcupine, hare, jackal, fox, wild boar and the bird species partridge, European turtle dove, common blackbird and quail.

The canyon offers outdoor recreational activities such as hiking, mountain climbing and cave excursion on daily basis. An observation deck serving the visitors is situated atop the canyon.
