= Çördük, Çerkeş =

Village in Turkey

Çördük
- Village
- Country: Turkey
- Province: Çankırı
- District: Çerkeş
- Population (2021): 42
- Time zone: UTC+3 (TRT)

Çördük is a village in the Çerkeş District of Çankırı Province in Turkey. It has a total population of 42 people (2021).
