= Bezirganlar, Bayramiç =

Village in Turkey

Bezirganlar
- Village
- Location in Turkey Bezirganlar (Marmara)
- Coordinates: 39.9092°N 26.7220°E
- Country: Turkey
- Province: Çanakkale
- District: Bayramiç
- Population (2021): 82
- Time zone: UTC+3 (TRT)

Bezirganlar is a village in the Bayramiç District of Çanakkale Province in Turkey. Its population is 82 (2021).
