= Bedil, Çerkeş =

Village in Turkey

Bedil
- Village
- Location in Turkey Bedil (Turkey Central Anatolia)
- Coordinates: 40.8375°N 32.8378°E
- Country: Turkey
- Province: Çankırı
- District: Çerkeş
- Population (2021): 78
- Time zone: UTC+3 (TRT)

Bedil is a village in the Çerkeş District of Çankırı Province in Turkey. Its population is 78 (2021).
