= Gözpınar, Aydın =

Gözpınar
- Neighbourhood
- Location in Turkey Gözpınar (Turkey Aegean)
- Coordinates: 37.918714°N 27.808092°E
- Country: Turkey
- Province: Aydın
- District: Efeler
- Population (2022): 340
- Time zone: UTC+3 (TRT)

Gözpınar is a neighbourhood in the municipality and district of Efeler, Aydın Province, Turkey. Its population is 340 (2022).
