= Çiftlikköy, Dodurga =

Village in Turkey

Çiftlikköy
- Village
- Country: Turkey
- Province: Çorum
- District: Dodurga
- Population (2022): 262
- Time zone: UTC+3 (TRT)

Çiftlikköy is a village in the Dodurga District of Çorum Province in Turkey. Its population is 262 (2022).
