= Pınardere, Aydın =

Pınardere
- Neighbourhood
- Country: Turkey
- Province: Aydın
- District: Efeler
- Population (2022): 610
- Time zone: UTC+3 (TRT)

Pınardere is a neighbourhood in the municipality and district of Efeler, Aydın Province, Turkey. Its population is 610 (2022).
