= Yeniköy (Dalama), Aydın =

Yeniköy
- Neighbourhood
- Location in Turkey Yeniköy (Turkey Aegean)
- Coordinates: 37°47′49″N 28°01′34″E
- Country: Turkey
- Province: Aydın
- District: Efeler
- Population (2022): 1,242
- Time zone: UTC+3 (TRT)

Yeniköy is a neighbourhood in the municipality and district of Efeler, Aydın Province, Turkey. Its population is 1,242 (2022).
