= Çakmak, Çerkeş =

Village in Turkey

Çakmak
- Village
- Location in Turkey Çakmak (Turkey Central Anatolia)
- Coordinates: 40.9758°N 33.0319°E
- Country: Turkey
- Province: Çankırı
- District: Çerkeş
- Population (2021): 40
- Time zone: UTC+3 (TRT)

Çakmak is a village in the Çerkeş District of Çankırı Province in Turkey. Its population is 40 (2021).
