= Kocagür, Aydın =

Kocagür
- Neighbourhood
- Location in Turkey Kocagür (Turkey Aegean)
- Coordinates: 37°50′31″N 27°54′22″E
- Country: Turkey
- Province: Aydın
- District: Efeler
- Population (2022): 916
- Time zone: UTC+3 (TRT)

Kocagür is a neighbourhood in the municipality and district of Efeler, Aydın Province, Turkey. Its population is 916 (2022).
