= Kalfaköy, Aydın =

Kalfaköy
- Neighbourhood
- Location in Turkey Kalfaköy (Turkey Aegean)
- Coordinates: 37.871824°N 27.851543°E
- Country: Turkey
- Province: Aydın
- District: Efeler
- Population (2022): 236
- Time zone: UTC+3 (TRT)

Kalfaköy is a neighbourhood in the municipality and district of Efeler, Aydın Province, Turkey. Its population is 236 (2022).
