= Dodurga, Çorum =

Dodurga
- Municipality
- Location within Turkey
- Coordinates: 40°20′N 34°20′E
- Country: Turkey
- Province: Çorum
- District: Dodurga

Government
  - Mayor: Mustafa Aydın (AKP)
- Population (2022): 2,409
- Time zone: UTC+3 (TRT)
- Area code: 0364
- Climate: Csb
- Website: www.dodurga.bel.tr

Dodurga is a town in Çorum Province in the Black Sea region of Turkey. It is the seat of Dodurga District. Its population is 2,409 (2022). It is located at 42 km north of the city of Çorum, 35 km from the town of Osmancık on the road to İskilip. The mayor is Mustafa Aydın (AKP).

== Geography ==
Dodurga sits in a plain surrounded on three sides by mountains, the eastern edge is formed by a 17 km long valley of the River Kızılırmak. 64% of the land area is the plain, 23% the valley and the remaining 12% being the mountains. Dodurga has a dry climate typical of Central Anatolia, the summers are hot and dry (July average 24 degrees C) and winters are cold (Jan. ave. 1.5) although the nearby Black Sea brings wetter weather in winter.

Most of the population live from farming. The land is fertile and mainly used for growing rice and grains as well as pulses such as chick peas, while mountain and meadow are used for grazing livestock. Since 1942 a second source of income has been coal mining. There is no industry except a flour mill and some bakeries.

== History ==
Also known as Totırga, Dodurga is named after a branch of the Bozok clan of Oghuz Turks, who settled here in the 14th century. The name derives from an old Turkish word for settlement or nation.

The area was first settled by Turkish people in the waves of invasion following the defeat of Byzantium at the battle of Malazgirt in 1074. Dodurga controlled an important route between the towns of İskilip and Osmancık and was subsequently fought over and conquered by Danishmend lords, Mongols and Seljuk Turks.
