= Eğrikavak, Aydın =

Eğrikavak
- Neighbourhood
- Location in Turkey Eğrikavak (Turkey Aegean)
- Coordinates: 37°57′04″N 28°00′04″E
- Country: Turkey
- Province: Aydın
- District: Efeler
- Population (2022): 1,294
- Time zone: UTC+3 (TRT)

Eğrikavak is a neighbourhood in the municipality and district of Efeler, Aydın Province, Turkey. Its population is 1,294 (2022).
