= Kabakköy, Çerkeş =

Village in Turkey

Kabakköy
- Village
- Location in Turkey Kabakköy (Turkey Central Anatolia)
- Coordinates: 40.913°N 32.953°E
- Country: Turkey
- Province: Çankırı
- District: Çerkeş
- Population (2021): 32
- Time zone: UTC+3 (TRT)

Kabakköy is a village in the Çerkeş District of Çankırı Province in Turkey. Its population is 32 (2021).
