= Horozköy, Aydın =

Horozköy
- Neighbourhood
- Country: Turkey
- Province: Aydın
- District: Efeler
- Population (2022): 157
- Time zone: UTC+3 (TRT)

Horozköy is a neighbourhood in the municipality and district of Efeler, Aydın Province, Turkey. Its population is 157 (2022).
