= Yeniköy, Aydın =

Yeniköy
- Neighbourhood
- Location in Turkey Yeniköy (Turkey Aegean)
- Coordinates: 37°49′45″N 27°49′25″E
- Country: Turkey
- Province: Aydın
- District: Efeler
- Population (2022): 2,006
- Time zone: UTC+3 (TRT)

Yeniköy is a neighbourhood in the municipality and district of Efeler, Aydın Province, Turkey. Its population is 2,006 (2022).
