= Dikenli, Dodurga =

Village in Turkey

Dikenli
- Village
- Country: Turkey
- Province: Çorum
- District: Dodurga
- Population (2022): 427
- Time zone: UTC+3 (TRT)

Dikenli is a village in the Dodurga District of Çorum Province in Turkey. Its population is 427 (2022).
