= Üçyol, Bayramiç =

Village in Turkey

Üçyol
- Village
- Location in Turkey Üçyol (Marmara)
- Coordinates: 39°54′43″N 26°41′21″E
- Country: Turkey
- Province: Çanakkale
- District: Bayramiç
- Population (2021): 26
- Time zone: UTC+3 (TRT)

Üçyol is a village in the Bayramiç District of Çanakkale Province in Turkey. Its population is 26 (2021).
