= Söğütgediği, Bayramiç =

Village in Turkey

Söğütgediği
- Village
- Location in Turkey Söğütgediği (Marmara)
- Coordinates: 39°56′N 26°45′E
- Country: Turkey
- Province: Çanakkale
- District: Bayramiç
- Population (2021): 227
- Time zone: UTC+3 (TRT)

Söğütgediği is a village in the Bayramiç District of Çanakkale Province in Turkey. Its population is 227 (2021).
