= Dalama =

- Neighbourhood
- Location in Turkey Dalama (Turkey Aegean)
- Coordinates: 37°47′N 28°04′E
- Country: Turkey
- Province: Aydın
- District: Efeler
- Elevation: 60 m (200 ft)
- Population (2022): 1,561
- Time zone: UTC+3 (TRT)
- Postal code: 09010
- Area code: 0256

Dalama is a neighbourhood of the municipality and district of Efeler, Aydın Province, Turkey. Its population is 1,561 (2022). Before the 2013 reorganisation, it was a town (belde). It is 28 kilometres (17 mi) south east of Aydın.

The settlement was founded about 200 years ago by Yörüks (nomadik Turkmens) who used to form pazar (open market) in the vicinity. During Greek occupation following the First World War Dalama participated in the national resistance and the name of the town is pronounced in the popular epic song of Yörük Ali Efe. The main economic sector is olive farming.
