= Kırıklar, Aydın =

Kırıklar
- Neighbourhood
- Location in Turkey Kırıklar (Turkey Aegean)
- Coordinates: 37.793736°N 28.087311°E
- Country: Turkey
- Province: Aydın
- District: Efeler
- Population (2022): 388
- Time zone: UTC+3 (TRT)

Kırıklar is a neighbourhood in the municipality and district of Efeler, Aydın Province, Turkey. Its population is 388 (2022).
