= Yumaklı, Çerkeş =

Village in Turkey

Yumaklı
- Village
- Location in Turkey Yumaklı (Turkey Central Anatolia)
- Coordinates: 40.721°N 32.756°E
- Country: Turkey
- Province: Çankırı
- District: Çerkeş
- Population (2021): 120
- Time zone: UTC+3 (TRT)

Yumaklı is a village in the Çerkeş District of Çankırı Province in Turkey. Its population is 120 (2021).
