= Bıyıklı, Bayramiç =

Village in Turkey

Bıyıklı
- Village
- Location in Turkey Bıyıklı (Marmara)
- Coordinates: 39.8547°N 26.6844°E
- Country: Turkey
- Province: Çanakkale
- District: Bayramiç
- Population (2021): 31
- Time zone: UTC+3 (TRT)

Bıyıklı is a village in the Bayramiç District of Çanakkale Province in Turkey. Its population is 31 (2021).
