= İncirliin Cave =

Cave and archaeological site in Turkey

- İncirliin Mağarası
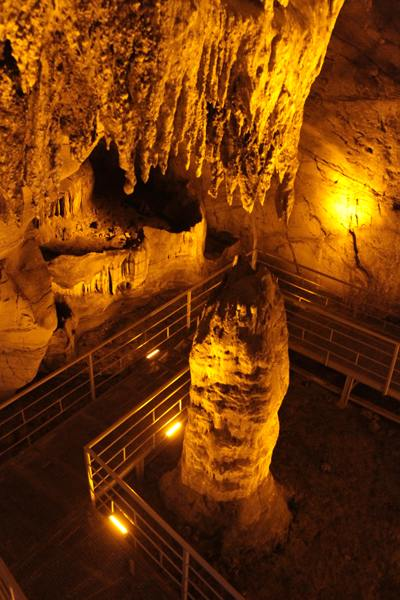

- Location within Turkey
- Location: Milas, Muğla Province, Turkey
- Coordinates: 37°11′23″N 27°45′43″E
- Depth: 3–10 m (9.8–32.8 ft)
- Length: 345 m (1,132 ft)
- Height variation: 2–20 m (6.6–65.6 ft)
- Entrances: 1
- Show cave opened: April 2016; 10 years ago
- Show cave length: 155 m (509 ft)
- Lighting: yes

İnicrliin Cave (Turkish: İncirliin Mağarası) is a show cave located in Gökçeler Canyon in Milas district of Muğla Province, Turkey. It is the most significant one and the only show cave in a group of nearly 30 caves in the canyon area. It is on the northern hillside of Mount Manastır overlooking the canyon.

== Description ==
The cave is 345 m (1,132 ft) long. It is a horizontal lying spring cave. Its forming was affected by a distinctive fault in a karst formation. The cave has a wide entrance. It is 3–10 m (9.8–32.8 ft) wide and has a clearance of 2–20 m (6.6–65.6 ft). It features ponds, giant stalactites and stalagmites. There are many rooms separated from the main gallery by stalactites. The rooms are mostly connected with each other by 6–7 m (20–23 ft) high passages. The "Gösteri Salonu" (literally "Show Room") in the middle of the cave is 7 m (23 ft) below the entrance level. The "Damlataş Galerisi" ("Dripstone Gallery") at the end of the show cave, which was formed on the fault, is situated 12 m (39 ft) higher than the entrance level.

In terms of hydrogeology, the cave is in a vadose zone. It remains totally dry but becomes wet by dripping water from the cave ceiling during the rainy period. Generally, the stalactites and stalagmites in the entrance, the "Yarasa Galerisi" ("Bat Gallery"), the "Havuzlu Salon" ("Pond's Room") and the "Gösteri Salonu" are partially fossilized, while the formation of the stalactites, stalagmites, columns and draperies in the "Damlataş Galerisi" ("Dripstone Gallery") is still continuing.

== Tourist access ==
The cave was fitted in 2013 with lighting that does not harm geological formations. In April 2016, a 155 m (509 ft)-long part of the cave was opened to the public as a show cave, from the total length of 345 m (1,132 ft).

== Archaeological findings ==
A great number of earthenware pieces, which are dated back to the prehistoric era and antiquity, were found in the ground at the entrance and inside the cave. By December 2016, archaeological excavations were started by the Muğla University in the section of the cave, which is not open to the public, Human and animal bones, stone tools and terracotta pieces were discovered. These finds show that the cave was inhabited in the ancient times already 8,000 years ago in 6000 BC. İncirliin Cave was registered as a first-grade archaeological site and first-grade nature reserve on February 27, 2008.
