= List of populated places in Çanakkale Province =

Places in Turkey

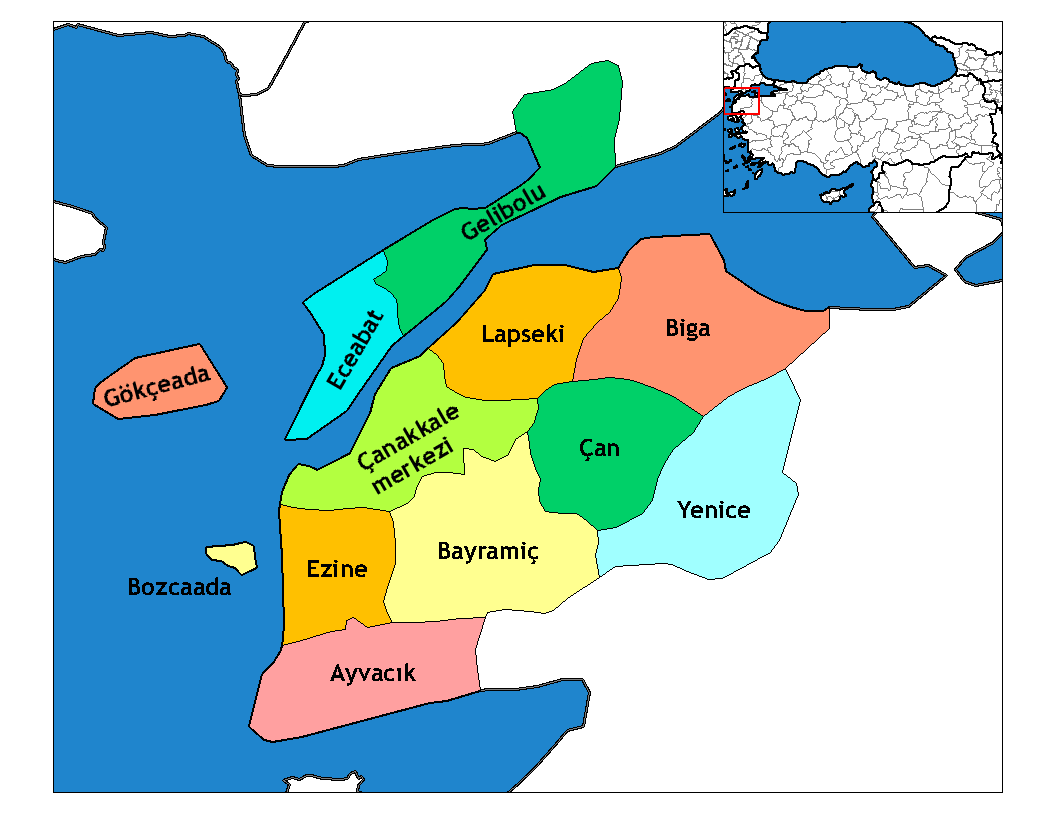
Çanakkale Province

Below is the list of populated places in Çanakkale Province, Turkey by district. In the following lists first place in each list is the administrative center of the district.

== Çanakkale ==
- Çanakkale
- Akçalı, Çanakkale
- Akçapınar, Çanakkale
- Akçeşme, Çanakkale
- Alanköy, Çanakkale
- Aşağıokçular, Çanakkale
- Belen, Çanakkale
- Bodurlar, Çanakkale
- Civler, Çanakkale
- Çamyayla, Çanakkale
- Çınarlı, Çanakkale
- Çıplak, Çanakkale
- Çiftlikdere, Çanakkale
- Dedeler, Çanakkale
- Denizgöründü, Çanakkale
- Dümrek, Çanakkale
- Elmacık, Çanakkale
- Erenköy, Çanakkale
- Gökçalı, Çanakkale
- Güzelyalı, Çanakkale
- Halileli, Çanakkale
- Haliloğlu, Çanakkale
- Işıklar, Çanakkale
- Kalabaklı, Çanakkale
- Kalafat, Çanakkale
- Karacalar, Çanakkale
- Karacaören, Çanakkale
- Karapınar, Çanakkale
- Kayadere, Çanakkale
- Kemalköy, Çanakkale
- Kepez, Çanakkale
- Kızılcaören, Çanakkale
- Kızılkeçili, Çanakkale
- Kirazlı, Çanakkale
- Kocalar, Çanakkale
- Kumkale, Çanakkale
- Kurşunlu, Çanakkale
- Maraşalfevziçakmak, Çanakkale
- Musaköy, Çanakkale
- Ortaca, Çanakkale
- Ovacık, Çanakkale
- Özbek, Çanakkale
- Salihler, Çanakkale
- Saraycık, Çanakkale
- Sarıbeyli, Çanakkale
- Sarıcaeli, Çanakkale
- Serçiler, Çanakkale
- Taşlıtarla, Çanakkale
- Terziler, Çanakkale
- Tevfikiye, Çanakkale
- Ulupınar, Çanakkale
- Yağcılar, Çanakkale
- Yapıldak, Çanakkale
- Yukarıokçular, Çanakkale

== Ayvacık ==
- Ayvacık
- Adatepe, Ayvacık
- Ahmetçe, Ayvacık
- Ahmetler, Ayvacık
- Akçin, Ayvacık
- Arıklı, Ayvacık
- Babadere, Ayvacık
- Babakale, Ayvacık
- Bademli, Ayvacık
- Baharlar, Ayvacık
- Bahçedere, Ayvacık
- Balabanlı, Ayvacık
- Behram, Ayvacık
- Bektaş, Ayvacık
- Bilaller, Ayvacık
- Budaklar, Ayvacık
- Büyükhusun, Ayvacık
- Cemaller, Ayvacık
- Çakmaklar, Ayvacık
- Çaltı, Ayvacık
- Çamkalabak, Ayvacık
- Çamköy, Ayvacık
- Çınarpınar, Ayvacık
- Demirci, Ayvacık
- Dibekli, Ayvacık
- Erecek, Ayvacık
- Gülpınar, Ayvacık
- Güzelköy, Ayvacık
- Hüseyinfakı, Ayvacık
- İlyasfakı, Ayvacık
- Kayalar, Ayvacık
- Keçikaya, Ayvacık
- Kestanelik, Ayvacık
- Kırca, Ayvacık
- Kısacık, Ayvacık
- Kocaköy, Ayvacık
- Korubaşı, Ayvacık
- Koyunevi, Ayvacık
- Kozlu, Ayvacık
- Kösedere, Ayvacık
- Kulfal, Ayvacık
- Kuruoba, Ayvacık
- Küçükçetmi, Ayvacık
- Küçükhusun, Ayvacık
- Küçükkuyu, Ayvacık
- Misvak, Ayvacık
- Naldöken, Ayvacık
- Nusratlı, Ayvacık
- Paşaköy, Ayvacık
- Pınardere, Ayvacık
- Sapanca, Ayvacık
- Sazlı, Ayvacık
- Söğütlü, Ayvacık
- Süleymanköy, Ayvacık
- Şapköy, Ayvacık
- Tabaklar, Ayvacık
- Tamış, Ayvacık
- Tartışık, Ayvacık
- Taşağıl, Ayvacık
- Taşboğaz, Ayvacık
- Tuzla, Ayvacık
- Tuztaşı, Ayvacık
- Uzunalan, Ayvacık
- Yeniçam, Ayvacık
- Yeşilyurt, Ayvacık
- Yukarıköy, Ayvacık

== Bayramiç ==
- Bayramiç
- Ağaçköy, Bayramiç
- Ahmetçeli, Bayramiç
- Akpınar, Bayramiç
- Alakeçi, Bayramiç
- Alikabaklar, Bayramiç
- Aşağışapcı, Bayramiç
- Aşağışevik, Bayramiç
- Bekirler, Bayramiç
- Beşik, Bayramiç
- Bezirganlar, Bayramiç
- Bıyıklı, Bayramiç
- Cazgirler, Bayramiç
- Çalıdağı, Bayramiç
- Çalıobaakçakıl, Bayramiç
- Çatalçam, Bayramiç
- Çavuşköy, Bayramiç
- Çavuşlu, Bayramiç
- Çırpılar, Bayramiç
- Çiftlik, Bayramiç
- Dağahmetçe, Bayramiç
- Dağoba, Bayramiç
- Daloba, Bayramiç
- Doğancı, Bayramiç
- Evciler, Bayramiç
- Gedik, Bayramiç
- Gökçeiçi, Bayramiç
- Güvemcik, Bayramiç
- Güzeltepe, Bayramiç
- Hacıbekirler, Bayramiç
- Hacıdervişler, Bayramiç
- Hacıköy, Bayramiç
- Işıkeli, Bayramiç
- Karaibrahimler, Bayramiç
- Karaköy, Bayramiç
- Karıncalık, Bayramiç
- Kaykılar, Bayramiç
- Korucak, Bayramiç
- Koşuburnutürkmenleri
- Köseler, Bayramiç
- Köylü, Bayramiç
- Kurşunlu, Bayramiç
- Kuşçayır, Bayramiç
- Kutluoba, Bayramiç
- Külcüler, Bayramiç
- Mollahasanlar, Bayramiç
- Muratlar, Bayramiç
- Nebiler, Bayramiç
- Osmaniye, Bayramiç
- Örenli, Bayramiç
- Palamutoba, Bayramiç
- Pınarbaşı, Bayramiç
- Pıtıreli, Bayramiç
- Saçaklı, Bayramiç
- Saraycık, Bayramiç
- Sarıdüz, Bayramiç
- Sarıot, Bayramiç
- Serhat, Bayramiç
- Söğütgediği, Bayramiç
- Toluklar, Bayramiç
- Tongurlu, Bayramiç
- Tülüler, Bayramiç
- Türkmenli, Bayramiç
- Üçyol, Bayramiç
- Üzümlü, Bayramiç
- Yahşieli, Bayramiç
- Yanıklar, Bayramiç
- Yassıbağ, Bayramiç
- Yaylacık, Bayramiç
- Yeniceköy, Bayramiç
- Yeniköy, Bayramiç
- Yeşilköy, Bayramiç
- Yiğitaliler, Bayramiç
- Yukarışapçı, Bayramiç
- Yukarışevik, Bayramiç
- Zerdalilik, Bayramiç
- Zeytinli, Bayramiç

== Biga ==
- Biga
- Abdiağa, Biga
- Adliye, Biga
- Ağaköy, Biga
- Ahmetler, Biga
- Akkayrak, Biga
- Akköprü, Biga
- Akpınar, Biga
- Aksaz, Biga
- Akyaprak, Biga
- Ambaroba, Biga
- Arabaalan, Biga
- Arabakonağı, Biga
- Aşağıdemirci, Biga
- Ayıtdere, Biga
- Aziziye, Biga
- Bahçeli, Biga
- Bakacak, Biga
- Bakacaklıçiftliği, Biga
- Balıklıçeşme, Biga
- Bekirli, Biga
- Bezirganlar, Biga
- Bozlar, Biga
- Camialan, Biga
- Cihadiye, Biga
- Çakırlı, Biga
- Çavuşköy, Biga
- Çelikgürü, Biga
- Çeltik, Biga
- Çeşmealtı, Biga
- Çınardere, Biga
- Çınarköprü, Biga
- Çömlekçi, Biga
- Danişment, Biga
- Değirmencik, Biga
- Dereköy, Biga
- Dikmen, Biga
- Doğancı, Biga
- Eğridere, Biga
- Elmalı, Biga
- Emirorman, Biga
- Eskibalıklı, Biga
- Eybekli, Biga
- Gemicikırı, Biga
- Geredelli, Biga
- Gerlengeç, Biga
- Geyikkırı, Biga
- Göktepe, Biga
- Güleç, Biga
- Gümüşçay, Biga
- Gündoğdu, Biga
- Gürçeşme, Biga
- Gürgendere, Biga
- Güvemalan, Biga
- Hacıhüseyinyaylası, Biga
- Hacıköy, Biga
- Hacıpehlivan, Biga
- Harmanlı, Biga
- Havdan, Biga
- Hisarlı, Biga
- Hoşoba, Biga
- Ilıcabaşı, Biga
- Işıkeli, Biga
- İdriskoru, Biga
- İlyasalan, Biga
- İskender, Biga
- Kahvetepe, Biga
- Kalafat, Biga
- Kaldırımbaşı, Biga
- Kanibey, Biga
- Kapanbelen, Biga
- Karaağaç, Biga
- Karabiga, Biga
- Karacaali, Biga
- Karahamzalar, Biga
- Karapürçek, Biga
- Kaşıkçıoba, Biga
- Katrancı, Biga
- Kayapınar, Biga
- Kaynarca, Biga
- Kazmalı, Biga
- Kemer, Biga
- Kepekli, Biga
- Kocagür, Biga
- Koruoba, Biga
- Kozçeşme, Biga
- Osmaniye, Biga
- Otlukdere, Biga
- Ovacık, Biga
- Örtülüce, Biga
- Paşaçayı, Biga
- Pekmezli, Biga
- Ramazanlar, Biga
- Sarıca, Biga
- Sarıkaya, Biga
- Sarısıvat, Biga
- Sarnıç, Biga
- Savaştepe, Biga
- Sazoba, Biga
- Selvi, Biga
- Sığırcık, Biga
- Sinekçi, Biga
- Şakirbey, Biga
- Şirinköy, Biga
- Tokatkırı, Biga
- Türkbakacak, Biga
- Yanıç, Biga
- Yenice, Biga
- Yeniçiftlik, Biga
- Yenimahalle, Biga
- Yeşilköy, Biga
- Yolindi, Biga
- Yukarıdemirci, Biga

== Bozcaada ==
- Bozcaada

== Çan ==
- Çan
- Ahlatlıburun, Çan
- Alibeyçiftliği, Çan
- Altıkulaç, Çan
- Asmalı, Çan
- Bahadırlı, Çan
- Bardakçılar, Çan
- Bilaller, Çan
- Bostandere, Çan
- Bozguç, Çan
- Büyükpaşa, Çan
- Büyüktepe, Çan
- Cicikler, Çan
- Çakılköy, Çan
- Çaltıkara, Çan
- Çamköy, Çan
- Çekiçler, Çan
- Çomaklı, Çan
- Danapınar, Çan
- Derenti, Çan
- Dereoba, Çan
- Doğaca, Çan
- Doğancılar, Çan
- Dondurma, Çan
- Duman, Çan
- Durali, Çan
- Emeşe, Çan
- Eskiyayla, Çan
- Etili, Çan
- Göle, Çan
- Hacıkasım, Çan
- Hacılar, Çan
- Halilağa, Çan
- Helvacı, Çan
- Hurma, Çan
- İlyasağaçiftliği, Çan
- Kadılar, Çan
- Kalburcu, Çan
- Karadağ, Çan
- Karakadılar, Çan
- Karakoca, Çan
- Karlı, Çan
- Kazabat, Çan
- Keçiağılı, Çan
- Kızılelma, Çan
- Kocayayla, Çan
- Koyunyeri, Çan
- Kulfal, Çan
- Kumarlar, Çan
- Küçüklü, Çan
- Küçükpaşa, Çan
- Mallı, Çan
- Maltepe, Çan
- Okçular, Çan
- Ozancık, Çan
- Sameteli, Çan
- Söğütalan, Çan
- Şerbetli, Çan
- Tepeköy, Çan
- Terzialan, Çan
- Uzunalan, Çan
- Üvezdere, Çan
- Yaya, Çan
- Yaykın, Çan
- Yeniçeri, Çan
- Yuvalar, Çan
- Zeybekçayır, Çan

== Eceabat ==
- Eceabat
- Alçıtepe, Eceabat
- Behramlı, Eceabat
- Beşyol, Eceabat
- Çamyayla, Eceabat
- Büyükanafarta, Eceabat
- Kilitbahir, Eceabat
- Kocadere, Eceabat
- Kumköy, Eceabat
- Küçükanafarta, Eceabat
- Seddülbahir, Eceabat
- Yalova, Eceabat
- Yolağzı, Eceabat

== Ezine ==
- Ezine
- Akçakeçili, Ezine
- Akköy, Ezine
- Aladağ, Ezine
- Alemşah, Ezine
- Arasanlı, Ezine
- Bahçeli, Ezine
- Balıklı, Ezine
- Belen, Ezine
- Bozalan, Ezine
- Bozeli, Ezine
- Çamköy, Ezine
- Çamlıca, Ezine
- Çamoba, Ezine
- Çarıksız, Ezine
- Çetmi, Ezine
- Çınarköy, Ezine
- Dalyan, Ezine
- Derbentbaşı, Ezine
- Geyikli, Ezine
- Gökçebayır, Ezine
- Güllüce, Ezine
- Hisaralan, Ezine
- Karadağ, Ezine
- Karagömlek, Ezine
- Kayacık, Ezine
- Kemallı, Ezine
- Kızılköy, Ezine
- Kızıltepe, Ezine
- Koçali, Ezine
- Köprübaşı, Ezine
- Körüktaşı, Ezine
- Köseler, Ezine
- Kumburun, Ezine
- Mahmudiye, Ezine
- Mecidiye, Ezine
- Pazarköy, Ezine
- Pınarbaşı, Ezine
- Sarpdere, Ezine
- Şapköy, Ezine
- Taştepe, Ezine
- Tavaklı, Ezine
- Uluköy, Ezine
- Üsküfçü, Ezine
- Üvecik, Ezine
- Yavaşlar, Ezine
- Yaylacık, Ezine
- Yenioba, Ezine
- Yeniköy, Ezine

== Gelibolu ==
- Gelibolu
- Adilhan, Gelibolu
- Bayırköy, Gelibolu
- Bayramiç, Gelibolu
- Bolayır, Gelibolu
- Burhanlı, Gelibolu
- Cevizli, Gelibolu
- Cumalı, Gelibolu
- Çokal, Gelibolu
- Değirmendüzü, Gelibolu
- Demirtepe, Gelibolu
- Evreşe, Gelibolu
- Fındıklı, Gelibolu
- Güneyli, Gelibolu
- Ilgardere, Gelibolu
- Kalealtı, Gelibolu
- Karainebeyli, Gelibolu
- Kavakköy, Gelibolu
- Kavaklı, Gelibolu
- Kocaçeşme, Gelibolu
- Koruköy, Gelibolu
- Ocaklı, Gelibolu
- Pazarlı, Gelibolu
- Süleymaniye, Gelibolu
- Sütlüce, Gelibolu
- Şadıllı, Gelibolu
- Tayfurköy, Gelibolu
- Yeniköy, Gelibolu
- Yülüce, Gelibolu

== Gökçeada ==
- Gökçeada
- Bademli, Gökçeada
- Dereköy, Gökçeada
- Eşelek, Gökçeada
- Kaleköy, Gökçeada
- Şirinköy, Gökçeada
- Tepeköy, Gökçeada
- Uğurlu, Gökçeada
- Yenibademli, Gökçeada
- Zeytinliköy, Gökçeada

== Lapseki ==
- Lapseki
- Adatepe, Lapseki
- Akçaalan, Lapseki
- Alpagut, Lapseki
- Balcılar, Lapseki
- Beybaş, Lapseki
- Beyçayırı, Lapseki
- Beypınar, Lapseki
- Çamyurt, Lapseki
- Çardak, Lapseki
- Çataltepe, Lapseki
- Çavuşköy, Lapseki
- Dereköy, Lapseki
- Dişbudak, Lapseki
- Doğandere, Lapseki
- Dumanlı, Lapseki
- Eçialan, Lapseki
- Gökköy, Lapseki
- Güreci, Lapseki
- Hacıgelen, Lapseki
- Hacıömerler, Lapseki
- Harmancık, Lapseki
- İlyasköy, Lapseki
- Kangırlı, Lapseki
- Karamusalar, Lapseki
- Karaömerler, Lapseki
- Kemiklialan, Lapseki
- Kırcalar, Lapseki
- Kızıldam, Lapseki
- Kocabaşlar, Lapseki
- Kocaveli, Lapseki
- Mecidiye, Lapseki
- Nusratiye, Lapseki
- Sındal, Lapseki
- Subaşı, Lapseki
- Suluca, Lapseki
- Şahinli, Lapseki
- Şevketiye, Lapseki
- Taştepe, Lapseki
- Umurbey, Lapseki
- Üçpınar, Lapseki
- Yaylalar, Lapseki
- Yeniceköy, Lapseki

== Yenice ==
- Yenice
- Akçakoyun, Yenice
- Akköy, Yenice
- Alancık, Yenice
- Araovacık, Yenice
- Armutçuk, Yenice
- Aşağıçavuş, Yenice
- Aşağıinova, Yenice
- Aşağıkaraaşık, Yenice
- Bağlı, Yenice
- Ballıçay, Yenice
- Başkoz, Yenice
- Bayatlar, Yenice
- Bekten, Yenice
- Boynanlar, Yenice
- Canbaz, Yenice
- Çakır, Yenice
- Çakıroba, Yenice
- Çal, Yenice
- Çamoba, Yenice
- Çınarcık, Yenice
- Çınarköy, Yenice
- Çırpılar, Yenice
- Çiftlik, Yenice
- Çukuroba, Yenice
- Darıalan, Yenice
- Davutköy, Yenice
- Gümüşler, Yenice
- Gündoğdu, Yenice
- Güzeloba, Yenice
- Hacılar, Yenice
- Hacıyusuflar, Yenice
- Hamdibey, Yenice
- Haydaroba, Yenice
- Hıdırlar, Yenice
- Kabalı, Yenice
- Kalabakbaşı, Yenice
- Kalkım, Yenice
- Karaaydın, Yenice
- Karadoru, Yenice
- Karaköy, Yenice
- Karasu, Yenice
- Kargacı, Yenice
- Kayatepe, Yenice
- Kıraçoba, Yenice
- Kırıklar, Yenice
- Kızıldam, Yenice
- Koruköy, Yenice
- Kovancı, Yenice
- Kuzupınarı, Yenice
- Namazgah, Yenice
- Nevruz, Yenice
- Oğlanalanı, Yenice
- Öğmen, Yenice
- Örencik, Yenice
- Pazarköy, Yenice
- Reşadiye, Yenice
- Sameteli, Yenice
- Sarıçayır, Yenice
- Sazak, Yenice
- Seyvan, Yenice
- Sofular, Yenice
- Soğucak, Yenice
- Suuçtu, Yenice
- Taban, Yenice
- Torhasan, Yenice
- Umurlar, Yenice
- Üçkabaağaç, Yenice
- Yağdıran, Yenice
- Yalıoba, Yenice
- Yarış, Yenice
- Yeniköy, Yenice
- Yeşilköy, Yenice
- Yukarıçavuş, Yenice
- Yukarıinova, Yenice
- Yukarıkaraaşık, Yenice
