= Kızılelma =

Kızılelma can refer to the following:

== Aircraft ==
- Bayraktar Kızılelma, unmanned fighter jet under development by Turkish defense company Baykar

== Places in Turkey ==
- Kızılelma, Bartın
- Kızılelma, Çan
- Kızılelma Cave
