= Çakırlı =

Çakırlı can refer to:

- Çakırlı, Biga
- Çakırlı, Tarsus
