= Küçük =

Küçük means "small" in Turkish and may refer to:

== People ==
=== Epithet ===
- Küçük Ahmed Pasha (died 1636), Ottoman military commander
- Küçük Ali (died 1804), also known as Ali Đevrlić, Ottoman janissary and civil servant
- Kuchuk Hanem (fl. 1850–1870), Ghawazi beauty and dancer
- Küçük Hüseyin Pasha (1757–1803), Ottoman politicianand admiral
- Küçük İskender (1964–2019), Turkish writer
- Küçük Mehmet Sait Pasha (1830–1914), Ottoman politician
- Küçük Mustafa (died 1422), Ottoman prince

=== Surname ===
- Fazıl Küçük (1906–1984), Turkish Cypriot politician
- İrsen Küçük (1940–2019), Turkish Cypriot politician
- Mustafa Küçük, Turkish businessman
- Raşit Küçük (1947–2022), Turkish Islamist
- Veli Küçük (born 1944), Turkish general
- Yalçın Küçük (1938–2026), Turkish writer, philosopher, economist, and historian

== Places ==
- Küçük Mecidiye Mosque, Ottoman-era mosque in the Beşiktaş district of Istanbul, Turkey
- Küçüklü (disambiguation), various places in Turkey
- Küçükmenderes River, in Turkey
- Küçük Tavşan Adası, pair of adjacent Turkish islands located in the Aegean Sea north of Gölköy, in Bodrum
- Küçük Tiyatro, theatre in Ankara, Turkey

== See also ==
- , since this is a common prefix
- Büyük (disambiguation), antonym, "big"
