= Yaykın =

Yaykın can refer to:

- Yaykın, Çan
- Yaykın, Karacasu
