= Bozlar =

Bozlar can refer to:

- Bozlar, Biga
- Bozlar, Burdur
