= Buyruk =

Buyruk may refer to:

- Buyruk (Shabak), the sacred book of the Shabak
- Buyruks, the sacred writings of the Alevi

== See also ==
- Büyük (disambiguation)
