= Karakoca =

Karakoca can refer to:

- Karakoca, Çan
- Karakoca, Karacabey
