= Doğancılar =

Doğancılar can refer to the following villages in Turkey:

- Doğancılar, Akçakoca
- Doğancılar, Alaplı
- Doğancılar, Çan
- Doğancılar, Dursunbey
- Doğancılar, Gölpazarı
