= Katrancı =

Katrancı may refer to:

- Katrancı, Biga
- Katrancı, Eskil, village in Aksaray Province, Turkey
- Katrancı, Haymana, village in Ankara Province, Turkey
