= Asmalı =

Asmalı can refer to:

- Asmalı, Çan
- Asmalı, Gölhisar
- Asmalı Konak
- Asmalı, Yumurtalık
