= Egridere =

Egridere may refer to:

- Eğridere, Turkish name of Ardino, a town in Southern Bulgaria
- Eğridere, Biga
- Eğridere, Sındırgı, a village
- Eğridere, Yenipazar, a village in Aydın Province, Turkey
- Seda Egridere (born 1982), Turkish actress and film director
