= Tepeköy =

Tepeköy (literally "hill village") is a popular Turkish place name and may refer to:

- Tepeköy, Akçakoca
- Tepeköy, Aydın, a village in Aydın district of Aydın Province, Turkey
- Tepeköy, Bala, a village in Bala district of Ankara Province, Turkey
- Tepeköy, Bergama, a village in Bergama district of İzmir Province, Turkey
- Tepeköy, Bor, a village in Bor district of Niğde Province, Turkey
- Tepeköy, Çan
- Tepeköy, Çine, a village in Çine district of Aydın Province, Turkey
- Tepeköy, Çilimli
- Tepeköy, Damal, a village in Damal district of Ardahan Province, Turkey
- Tepeköy, Dursunbey, a village
- Tepeköy, Elâzığ
- Tepeköy, Emirdağ, a village in Emirdağ district of Afyon Province, Turkey
- Tepeköy, Hamamözü, a village in Hamamözü district of Amasya Province, Turkey
- Tepeköy, Haymana, a village in Haymana district of Ankara Province, Turkey
- Tepeköy, Manavgat, a village in Manavgat district of Antalya Province, Turkey
- Tepeköy, Mersin, a town in Mersin Province, Turkey
- Tepeköy, Nallıhan, a village in Nallıhan district of Ankara Province, Turkey
- Tepeköy, Tarsus, a village in Tarsus district of Mersin Province, Turkey
- Tepeköy, Sarayköy
- Tepeköy, Refahiye
- Tepeköy, Şavşat, a village in Şavşat district of Artvin Province, Turkey
- Tepeköy, Seben
- Tepeköy railway station, Torbalı, the southern terminus of the IZBAN's Southern Line
