= Maltepe =

Maltepe may refer to several places in Turkey:

- Maltepe, Çan, a village in Çanakkale Province
- Maltepe, Çankaya, a quarter in Çankaya, Ankara
- Maltepe, Çay, a village in Afyonkarahisar Province
- Maltepe, Istanbul, a district and municipality of Istanbul Province
  - Maltepe metro station, an underground rail station on the M4 line
  - Maltepe railway station, a surface rail station on the Haydarpaşa-Gebze and Haydarpaşa-Adapazarı lines
  - Maltepe University
- Maltepe, Keşan, a village in Edirne Province
- Maltepe, Yüreğir, a village in Adana Province
- Maltepe (Kilise Tepe), a mound in Mersin Province
