= Kulfal =

Kulfal can refer to:

- Kulfal, Ayvacık
- Kulfal, Çan
