= Bilaller =

Bilaller can refer to:

- Bilaller, Ayvacık
- Bilaller, Çan
