= Çomaklı =

Çomaklı can refer to:

- Çomaklı, Çan
- Çomaklı, Korkuteli
