= Yenimahalle (disambiguation) =

Yenimahalle is a municipality and metropolitan district of Ankara Province, Turkey.

Yenimahalle may also refer to:

- Yenimahalle, Biga, a village in Turkey
- Yenimahalle station (M3), on the Istanbul Metro M3 line
- Yenimahalle station (M7), on the Istanbul Metro M7 line
