= Büyük =

Büyük means "big" in Turkic languages and may refer to:

== People ==
=== Given name ===
- Büyük Jeddikar (1929–2013), Iranian retired footballer
- Büyük Vatankhah (born 1943), Iranian retired footballer

=== Surname ===
- Adem Büyük (born 1987), Turkish footballer
- Musa Büyük (born 1980), Turkish footballer

== Places ==
- Büyük Han, caravansarai in Cyprus
- Büyük Menderes River, river in southwestern Turkey, the ancient river Meander
- Büyük Saat, clock tower in Turkey

== Media ==
- Büyük Düşler, fifth studio album of Turkish alternative rock band Mor ve Ötesi
- Büyük Teklif, Turkish version of Deal or No Deal
- Büyük Türkiye Partisi, short-lived Turkish political party in 1983

== See also ==
- Büyük ada (disambiguation), "big island"
- , since this is a common prefix
- Küçük (disambiguation), antonym, "small"
