= Karacaali =

Karacaali can refer to:

- Karacaali, Biga
- Karacaali, Keşan
