= Uzunalan =

Uzunalan can refer to:

- Uzunalan, Ayvacık
- Uzunalan, Çan
