= Aksaz =

Aksaz may refer to:

- Aksaz, Biga
- Aksaz, Kuyucak
- Aksaz, Manavgat
- Aksaz Naval Base
