= Çekiçler =

Çekiçler can refer to:

- Çekiçler, Aksaray
- Çekiçler, Çan
