= Çakılköy =

Çakılköy may refer to:

- Çakılköy, Bandırma, a village in Balıkesir Province, Turkey
- Çakılköy, Çan, a village in Çanakkale Province, Turkey
