= Adliye =

Adliye can refer to:

- Adliye, Biga
- Adliye, Gemlik
- Adliye, Osmaneli
