= Bostandere =

Bostandere can refer to:

- Bostandere, Çan
- Bostandere, Mustafakemalpaşa
- Bostandere, Refahiye
