= Ozancık =

Ozancık can refer to:

- Ozancık, Çan
- Ozancık, Ortaköy
