= Aşağıdemirci =

Aşağıdemirci can refer to:

- Aşağıdemirci, Biga
- Aşağıdemirci, Kovancılar
