= Kalafat =

Kalafat can refer to the following villages in Turkey:

- Kalafat, Biga
- Kalafat, Bigadiç
- Kalafat, Çanakkale
- Kalafat, Cide

== See also ==
- Calafat, a city in Romania
