= Kadılar =

Kadılar may refer to:

- Kadılar, Çan
- Kadılar, Çine
- Kadılar, Dinar
- Kadılar, Manavgat
- Kadılar, Mengen
