= Helvacı =

Helvacı can refer to:

- Helvacı, Çan
- Helvacı, Karataş
