= Koila (Thrace) =

Ancient town in Turkey

Coordinates: 40°12′26″N 26°22′03″E

Koila was a town of ancient Thrace on the Thracian Chersonese.

Its site is located 2 miles (3.2 km) north of Eceabat in European Turkey.
