= Hurma =

Hurma can refer to:

- Hurma, Çan, village
- another name for Kalburabastı
