= Yeniçeri (surname) =

Yeniçeri (pronounced [jeˈnitʃeɾi]) is a Turkish surname. It originally indicated a member of an Ottoman infantry division, known in English as a janissary. Notable people with the surname include:

- Berna Yeniçeri (born 1996), Turkish footballer
- Özcan Yeniçeri (born 1954), Turkish politician and academic

== See also ==
- Yeniçeri, Çan, a village in Çanakkale Province, Turkey
