= Çeltik (disambiguation) =

Çeltik can refer to:

- Çeltik
- Çeltik, Biga
- Çeltik, Keşan
