= Pekmezli =

Pekmezli can refer to:

- Pekmezli, Biga
- Pekmezli, Erzincan
- Pekmezli, Tufanbeyli
