= Ramazanlar =

Ramazanlar can refer to:

- Ramazanlar, Biga
- Ramazanlar, Dursunbey
