= Okçular =

Okçular can refer to:

- Okçular, Alaplı
- Okçular, Bartın
- Okçular, Çan
- Okçular, Çubuk
- Okçular, Dinar
- Okçular, Ilgaz
- Okçular, Karacabey
- Okçular, Karakoçan
- Okçular, Kovancılar
