= Ağaköy =

Ağaköy can refer to:

- Ağaköy, Biga
- Ağaköy, Ulus
