= Bekirli, Biga =

Bekirli
- Village
- Location within Turkey Location within Marmara
- Coordinates: 40°22′50″N 27°3′46″E
- Country: Turkey
- Province: Çanakkale
- District: Biga
- Elevation: 75 m (246 ft)
- Population (2021): 231
- Time zone: UTC+3 (TRT)
- Postal code: 17200
- Area code: 0286

Bekirli is a köy (village) in Biga District of Çanakkale Province, Turkey. Its population is 231 (2021). Bekirli lies on the Kemer Road (Kemer Yolu), the north–south road between the village of Otlukdere and the coastal village of Kemer, and the bypass lies to the east of the village.
