= Bakacak =

Bakacak can refer to:

- Bakacak, Biga
- Bakacak, Bismil
- Bakacak, Gölyaka
- Bakacak, Refahiye
