= Gürçeşme =

Gürçeşme can refer to:

- Gürçeşme, Biga
- Gürçeşme, Devrek
