= Kumarlar, Çan =

Kumarlar
- Village
- Location in Turkey Kumarlar (Marmara)
- Coordinates: 40°2′21″N 26°49′58″E
- Country: Turkey
- Province: Çanakkale
- District: Çan
- Elevation: 252 m (827 ft)
- Population (2021): 151
- Time zone: UTC+3 (TRT)

Kumarlar is a village in the Çan District of Çanakkale Province in Turkey. Its population is 151 (2021). Its elevation is 252 m (827 ft). It is 7 km (4.4 mi) north of Etili.
