= Çan District =

District of Çanakkale Province, Turkey

- District
- Map showing Çan District in Çanakkale Province

- Location in Turkey Çan District (Marmara)
- Coordinates: 40°02′N 27°03′E
- Country: Turkey
- Province: Çanakkale
- Seat: Çan

Government
  - Kaymakam: Mustafa Gürdal
- Area: 905 km^{2} (349 sq mi)
- Population (2021): 48,023
  - Density: 53/km^{2} (140/sq mi)
- Time zone: UTC+3 (TRT)
- Website: www.can.gov.tr

Çan District is a district of the Çanakkale Province of Turkey. Its seat is the town of Çan. Its area is 905 km^{2}, and its population is 48,023 (2021).

== Composition ==
There are two municipalities in Çan District:

- Çan
- Terzialan

There are 65 villages in Çan District:

- Ahlatlıburun
- Alibeyçiftliği
- Altıkulaç
- Asmalı
- Bahadırlı
- Bardakçılar
- Bilaller
- Bostandere
- Bozguç
- Büyükpaşa
- Büyüktepe
- Çakılköy
- Çaltıkara
- Çamköy
- Çekiçler
- Cicikler
- Çomaklı
- Danapınar
- Derenti
- Dereoba
- Doğaca
- Doğancılar
- Dondurma
- Duman
- Durali
- Emeşe
- Eskiyayla
- Etili
- Göle
- Hacıkasım
- Hacılar
- Halilağa
- Helvacı
- Hurma
- İlyasağaçiftliği
- Kadılar
- Kalburcu
- Karadağ
- Karakadılar
- Karakoca
- Karlı
- Kazabat
- Keçiağılı
- Kızılelma
- Kocayayla
- Koyunyeri
- Kulfal
- Kumarlar
- Küçüklü
- Küçükpaşa
- Mallı
- Maltepe
- Okçular
- Ozancık
- Sameteli
- Şerbetli
- Söğütalanı
- Tepeköy
- Üvezdere
- Uzunalan
- Yaya
- Yaykın
- Yeniçeri
- Yuvalar
- Zeybekçayırı
