= Biga District =

District of Çanakkale Province, Turkey

- District
- Map showing Biga District in Çanakkale Province

- Location in Turkey Biga District (Marmara)
- Coordinates: 40°14′N 27°15′E
- Country: Turkey
- Province: Çanakkale
- Seat: Biga

Government
  - Kaymakam: Erdinç Dolu
- Area: 1,310 km^{2} (510 sq mi)
- Population (2021): 91,537
  - Density: 69.9/km^{2} (181/sq mi)
- Time zone: UTC+3 (TRT)
- Website: www.biga.gov.tr

Biga District is a district of the Çanakkale Province of Turkey. Its seat is the city of Biga. Its area is 1,310 km^{2}, and its population is 91,537 (2021).

== Composition ==
There are three municipalities in Biga District:

- Biga
- Gümüşçay
- Karabiga

There are 108 villages in Biga District:

- Abdiağa
- Adliye
- Ağaköy
- Ahmetler
- Akkayrak
- Akköprü
- Akpınar
- Aksaz
- Akyaprak
- Ambaroba
- Arabaalan
- Arabakonağı
- Aşağıdemirci
- Ayıtdere
- Aziziye
- Bahçeli
- Bakacak
- Bakacaklıçiftliği
- Balıklıçeşme
- Bekirli
- Bezirganlar
- Bozlar
- Çakırlı
- Camialan
- Çelikgürü
- Çeltik
- Çeşmealtı
- Cihadiye
- Çınardere
- Çınarköprü
- Çömlekçi
- Danişment
- Değirmencik
- Dereköy
- Dikmen
- Doğancı
- Eğridere
- Elmalı
- Emirorman
- Eskibalıklı
- Eybekli
- Gemicikırı
- Geredelli
- Gerlengeç
- Geyikkırı
- Göktepe
- Güleç
- Gündoğdu
- Gürçeşme
- Gürgendere
- Güvemalan
- Hacıhüseyinyaylası
- Hacıköy
- Hacıpehlivan
- Harmanlı
- Havdan
- Hisarlı
- Hoşoba
- İdriskoru
- Ilıcabaşı
- İlyasalanı
- Işıkeli
- İskenderköy
- Kahvetepe
- Kalafat
- Kaldırımbaşı
- Kanibey
- Kapanbeleni
- Karaağaç
- Karacaali
- Karahamzalar
- Karapürçek
- Kaşıkçıoba
- Katrancı
- Kayapınar
- Kaynarca
- Kazmalı
- Kemer
- Kepekli
- Kocagür
- Kozçeşme
- Koruoba
- Örtülüce
- Osmaniye
- Otlukdere
- Ovacık
- Paşaçayı
- Pekmezli
- Ramazanlar
- Şakirbey
- Sarıca
- Sarıkaya
- Sarısıvat
- Sarnıçköy
- Savaştepe
- Sazoba
- Selvi
- Sığırcık
- Sinekçi
- Şirinköy
- Tokatkırı
- Türkbakacak
- Yanıç
- Yeniçiftlik
- Yenimahalle
- Yeşilköy
- Yolindi
- Yukarıdemirci
