= Hermaion =

Town in ancient Mysia

Coordinates: 40°19′35″N 27°03′26″E

Hermaion (Ancient Greek: Ἑρμαῑον) or Hermaeum (Latin) was a location in ancient Mysia, which formed part of the border between the city-states of Lampsacus and Parium. It was probably the same place as Hermoton (Ancient Greek: Ἕρμωτον), mentioned by Arrian, and may have been the site of a village or town. It was located near Çınardere, Turkey.

== History ==
In his Strategemata, Polyaenus describes how a boundary dispute between Lampsacus and Parium was resolved by an informal race between representatives of the two cities. Each party sent a delegation along the road between the towns, agreeing to set the boundary wherever their representatives met. However, by a ruse the Lampsacenes delayed the Parians, leading to the boundary being established at Hermaion, much closer to Parium than to Lampsacus.

The Lampsacenes persuaded the fishermen along the road near Parium to cook some fish and offer a libation in honour of Poseidon when the Parians arrived, and to invite the Parians to join in the sacrifice. The Parians agreed, and stopped to eat and drink with the fishermen, thus delaying their meeting with the Lampsacenes. As a result, the Parians had only traveled seventy stadia along the road when they met the Lampsacene delegation at Hermaion, two hundred stadia from their town. By this ruse, Lampsacus gained a considerable amount of territory at the expense of Parium.

Arrian mentions a Hermoton, probably the same place, as one of the wayposts passed by Alexander the Great's army between Colonae and the Granicus in 334 BC. From here, or shortly after passing by, Alexander sent scouting parties to explore the surrounding countryside. The names Hermaion and Hermoton probably referred to a border marker made from earth or stone, and the nearby river Hermotus evidently owed its name to the place. There was probably a village or town at Hermoton, which would account for Alexander having stopped there.

== Bibliography ==
- Polyaenus, Strategemata (Stratagems).
- Lucius Flavius Arrianus (Arrian of Nicomedia), The Anabasis of Alexander.
- August Pauly, Georg Wissowa, et alii, Realencyclopädie der Classischen Altertumswissenschaft (Scientific Encyclopedia of the Knowledge of Classical Antiquities, abbreviated RE or PW), J. B. Metzler, Stuttgart (1894–1980).
- Richard Talbert (ed.), Barrington Atlas of the Greek and Roman World, Princeton University Press (2000).
