= Eceabat District =

District of Çanakkale Province, Turkey

- District
- Map showing Eceabat District in Çanakkale Province

- Location in Turkey Eceabat District (Marmara)
- Coordinates: 40°11′N 26°21′E
- Country: Turkey
- Province: Çanakkale
- Seat: Eceabat

Government
  - Kaymakam: Mustafa Çiftçiler
- Area: 430 km^{2} (170 sq mi)
- Population (2021): 8,769
  - Density: 20/km^{2} (53/sq mi)
- Time zone: UTC+3 (TRT)
- Website: www.eceabat.gov.tr

Eceabat District is a district of the Çanakkale Province of Turkey. Its seat is the town of Eceabat. Its area is 430 km^{2}, and its population is 8,769 (2021).

== Composition ==
There is one municipality in Eceabat District:

- Eceabat

There are 12 villages in Eceabat District:

- Alçıtepe
- Behramlı
- Beşyol
- Bigalı
- Büyükanafarta
- Kilidülbahir
- Kocadere
- Kumköy
- Küçükanafarta
- Seddülbahir
- Yalova
- Yolağzı
