= Küçüklü =

Küçüklü is a Turkish place name that may refer to the following places in Turkey:

- Küçüklü, Çan
- Küçüklü, Çankırı
- Küçüklü, Gazipaşa, a village in the district of Gazipaşa, Antalya Province
- Küçüklü, Korkuteli, a village in the district of Korkuteli, Antalya Province
