= Abdiağa, Biga =

Village in Turkey

Abdiağa
- Village
- Location in Turkey Abdiağa (Marmara)
- Coordinates: 40°12′11″N 27°14′59″E
- Country: Turkey
- Province: Çanakkale
- District: Biga
- Population (2021): 252
- Time zone: UTC+3 (TRT)

Abdiağa is a village in the Biga District of Çanakkale Province in Turkey. Its population is 252 (2021).
