= Eybekli, Biga =

Village in Turkey

Eybekli
- Village
- Location in Turkey Eybekli (Marmara)
- Coordinates: 40°11′N 27°13′E
- Country: Turkey
- Province: Çanakkale
- District: Biga
- Population (2021): 77
- Time zone: UTC+3 (TRT)

Eybekli is a village in the Biga District of Çanakkale Province in Turkey. Its population is 77 (2021).
