= Güvemalan, Biga =

Village in Turkey

Güvemalan
- Village
- Location in Turkey Güvemalan (Marmara)
- Coordinates: 40°17′N 27°28′E
- Country: Turkey
- Province: Çanakkale
- District: Biga
- Population (2021): 609
- Time zone: UTC+3 (TRT)

Güvemalan is a village in the Biga District of Çanakkale Province in Turkey. Its population is 609 (2021).
