= Balıklıçeşme, Biga =

Village in Turkey

Balıklıçeşme
- Village
- Location in Turkey Balıklıçeşme (Marmara)
- Coordinates: 40°19′N 27°05′E
- Country: Turkey
- Province: Çanakkale
- District: Biga
- Population (2021): 1,155
- Time zone: UTC+3 (TRT)

Balıklıçeşme is a village in the Biga District of Çanakkale Province in Turkey. Its population is 1,155 (2021). Before the 2013 reorganisation, it was a town (belde).
