= Güleç, Biga =

Village in Turkey

Güleç
- Village
- Location in Turkey Güleç (Marmara)
- Coordinates: 40.2809°N 27.2246°E
- Country: Turkey
- Province: Çanakkale
- District: Biga
- Population (2021): 500
- Time zone: UTC+3 (TRT)

Güleç is a village in the Biga District of Çanakkale Province in Turkey. Its population is 500 (2021).
