= Şakirbey, Biga =

Village in Turkey

Şakirbey
- Village
- Location in Turkey Şakirbey (Marmara)
- Coordinates: 40°15′N 27°15′E
- Country: Turkey
- Province: Çanakkale
- District: Biga
- Population (2021): 211
- Time zone: UTC+3 (TRT)

Şakirbey is a village in the Biga District of Çanakkale Province in Turkey. Its population is 211 (2021).
