= Selvi, Biga =

Village in Turkey

Selvi
- Village
- Country: Turkey
- Province: Çanakkale
- District: Biga
- Population (2021): 431
- Time zone: UTC+3 (TRT)

Selvi is a village in the Biga District of Çanakkale Province in Turkey. Its population is 431 (2021).
