= Kızılelma Cave =

Second longest cave in Turkey

Coordinates: 41.45312°N 31.93510°E

Kızılelma Cave (Turkish: Kızılelma Mağarası) is a cave in the Ayiçi neighborhood of Zonguldak, northern Turkey. It is the country's second longest cave.
