= Bahçeli, Biga =

Village in Turkey

Bahçeli
- Village
- Location in Turkey Bahçeli (Marmara)
- Coordinates: 40.2443°N 27.3168°E
- Country: Turkey
- Province: Çanakkale
- District: Biga
- Population (2021): 256
- Time zone: UTC+3 (TRT)

Bahçeli is a village in the Biga District of Çanakkale Province in Turkey. Its population is 256 (2021).
