= Büyüktepe, Çan =

Village in Turkey

Büyüktepe
- Village
- Location in Turkey Büyüktepe (Marmara)
- Coordinates: 40.0105°N 27.0474°E
- Country: Turkey
- Province: Çanakkale
- District: Çan
- Population (2021): 379
- Time zone: UTC+3 (TRT)

Büyüktepe is a village in the Çan District of Çanakkale Province in Turkey. Its population is 379 (2021).
