= Göktepe, Biga =

Village in Turkey

Göktepe
- Village
- Location in Turkey Göktepe (Marmara)
- Coordinates: 40.2863°N 27.1242°E
- Country: Turkey
- Province: Çanakkale
- District: Biga
- Population (2021): 379
- Time zone: UTC+3 (TRT)

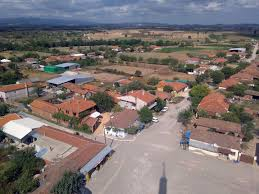
View from Göktepe-minaret

Göktepe is a village in the Biga District of Çanakkale Province in Turkey. Its population is 379 (2021).
