= Karlı, Çan =

Village in Turkey

Karlı
- Village
- Country: Turkey
- Province: Çanakkale
- District: Çan
- Population (2021): 62
- Time zone: UTC+3 (TRT)

Karlı is a village in the Çan District of Çanakkale Province in Turkey. Its population is 62 (2021).
