= Geyikkırı, Biga =

Village in Turkey

Geyikkırı
- Village
- Location in Turkey Geyikkırı (Marmara)
- Coordinates: 40°18′32″N 27°08′22″E
- Country: Turkey
- Province: Çanakkale
- District: Biga
- Population (2021): 98
- Time zone: UTC+3 (TRT)

Geyikkırı is a village in the Biga District of Çanakkale Province in Turkey. Its population is 98 (2021).
