= Küçükanafarta, Eceabat =

Village in Turkey

Küçükanafarta
- Village
- Location in Turkey Küçükanafarta (Marmara)
- Coordinates: 40°18′N 26°19′E
- Country: Turkey
- Province: Çanakkale
- District: Eceabat
- Population (2021): 204
- Time zone: UTC+3 (TRT)

Küçükanafarta is a village in the Eceabat District of Çanakkale Province in Turkey. Its population is 204 (2021).
