= Büyük Teklif =

Turkish television game show

Büyük Teklif (Turkish for "big offer") is the Turkish version of Deal or No Deal that airs on Kanal D. Hosted by Halit Ergenç, it was broadcast between June 5 and December 11, 2006. The amounts go from as little as 1 kuruş to as big as 500,000 Turkish lira (about US$350,000, €270,000, and £178,000).

Kanal D's website reveals that the set is quite similar to the US counterpart, as with many other post-2005-launched versions of the show.

== Case values ==
0.01 YTL	1,000 YTL
1 YTL	2,500 YTL
2 YTL	5,000 YTL
5 YTL	7,500 YTL
10 YTL	10,000 YTL
20 YTL	20,000 YTL
50 YTL	30,000 YTL
100 YTL	40,000 YTL
200 YTL	50,000 YTL
300 YTL	75,000 YTL
400 YTL	100,000 YTL
500 YTL	250,000 YTL
750 YTL	500,000 YTL

== See also ==
- Var mısın? Yok musun? - Another Turkish version of Deal or No Deal, produced by Show TV.
