= Karahamzalar, Biga =

Village in Turkey

Karahamzalar
- Village
- Location in Turkey Karahamzalar (Marmara)
- Coordinates: 40°20′47″N 27°08′21″E
- Country: Turkey
- Province: Çanakkale
- District: Biga
- Population (2021): 265
- Time zone: UTC+3 (TRT)

Karahamzalar is a village in the Biga District of Çanakkale Province in Turkey. Its population is 265 (2021).
