= Çömlekçi, Biga =

Village in Turkey

Çömlekçi
- Village
- Location in Turkey Çömlekçi (Marmara)
- Coordinates: 40.2215°N 26.9936°E
- Country: Turkey
- Province: Çanakkale
- District: Biga
- Population (2021): 30
- Time zone: UTC+3 (TRT)

Çömlekçi is a village in the Biga District of Çanakkale Province in Turkey. Its population is 30 (2021).
