= Üvezdere, Çan =

Village in Turkey

Üvezdere
- Village
- Location in Turkey Üvezdere (Marmara)
- Coordinates: 40°03′33″N 26°51′24″E
- Country: Turkey
- Province: Çanakkale
- District: Çan
- Population (2021): 48
- Time zone: UTC+3 (TRT)

Üvezdere is a village in the Çan District of Çanakkale Province in Turkey. Its population is 48 (2021).
