= Kocagür, Biga =

Village in Turkey

Kocagür
- Village
- Location in Turkey Kocagür (Marmara)
- Coordinates: 40.3544°N 27.1852°E
- Country: Turkey
- Province: Çanakkale
- District: Biga
- Population (2021): 560
- Time zone: UTC+3 (TRT)

Kocagür is a village in the Biga District of Çanakkale Province in Turkey. Its population is 560 (2021).
