= Mallı, Çan =

Village in Turkey

Mallı
- Village
- Location in Turkey Mallı (Marmara)
- Coordinates: 40°03′N 27°02′E
- Country: Turkey
- Province: Çanakkale
- District: Çan
- Population (2021): 130
- Time zone: UTC+3 (TRT)

Mallı is a village in the Çan District of Çanakkale Province in Turkey. Its population is 130 (2021).
