= Sarısıvat, Biga =

Village in Turkey

Sarısıvat
- Village
- Location in Turkey Sarısıvat (Marmara)
- Coordinates: 40°11′N 27°10′E
- Country: Turkey
- Province: Çanakkale
- District: Biga
- Population (2021): 146
- Time zone: UTC+3 (TRT)

Sarısıvat is a village in the Biga District of Çanakkale Province in Turkey. Its population is 146 (2021).
