= Göle, Çan =

Village in Turkey

Göle
- Village
- Country: Turkey
- Province: Çanakkale
- District: Çan
- Population (2021): 143
- Time zone: UTC+3 (TRT)

Göle is a village in the Çan District of Çanakkale Province in Turkey. Its population is 143 (2021).
