= Ambaroba, Biga =

Village in Turkey

Ambaroba
- Village
- Location in Turkey Ambaroba (Marmara)
- Coordinates: 40°13′N 27°24′E
- Country: Turkey
- Province: Çanakkale
- District: Biga
- Population (2021): 167
- Time zone: UTC+3 (TRT)

Ambaroba is a village in the Biga District of Çanakkale Province in Turkey. Its population is 167 (2021).
