= Akyaprak, Biga =

Village in Turkey

Akyaprak
- Village
- Location in Turkey Akyaprak (Marmara)
- Coordinates: 40.2326°N 27.1858°E
- Country: Turkey
- Province: Çanakkale
- District: Biga
- Population (2021): 189
- Time zone: UTC+3 (TRT)

Akyaprak is a village in the Biga District of Çanakkale Province in Turkey. Its population is 189 (2021).
