= Büyükanafarta, Eceabat =

Village in Turkey

Büyükanafarta
- Village
- Location in Turkey Büyükanafarta (Marmara)
- Coordinates: 40°17′N 26°20′E
- Country: Turkey
- Province: Çanakkale
- District: Eceabat
- Population (2021): 196
- Time zone: UTC+3 (TRT)

Büyükanafarta is a village in the Eceabat District of Çanakkale Province in Turkey. Its population is 196 (2021).
