= Karadağ, Çan =

Village in Turkey

Karadağ
- Village
- Location within Turkey Location within Marmara
- Country: Turkey
- Province: Çanakkale
- District: Çan
- Population (2021): 485
- Time zone: UTC+3 (TRT)

Karadağ is a village in the Çan District of Çanakkale Province in Turkey. Its population is 485 (2021).
