= Bigalı, Eceabat =

Village in Turkey

Bigalı
- Village
- Location in Turkey Bigalı (Marmara)
- Coordinates: 40°14′10″N 26°21′34″E
- Country: Turkey
- Province: Çanakkale
- District: Eceabat
- Population (2021): 115
- Time zone: UTC+3 (TRT)

Bigalı is a village in the Eceabat District of Çanakkale Province in Turkey. Its population is 115 (2021).
