= Gerlengeç, Biga =

Village in Turkey

Gerlengeç
- Village
- Location in Turkey Gerlengeç (Marmara)
- Coordinates: 40°18′N 27°25′E
- Country: Turkey
- Province: Çanakkale
- District: Biga
- Population (2021): 452
- Time zone: UTC+3 (TRT)

Gerlengeç is a village in the Biga District of Çanakkale Province in Turkey. Its population is 452 (2021).
