= İlyasalan, Biga =

Village in Turkey

İlyasalan
- Village
- Country: Turkey
- Province: Çanakkale
- District: Biga
- Population (2021): 123
- Time zone: UTC+3 (TRT)

İlyasalan is a village in the Biga District of Çanakkale Province in Turkey. Its population is 123 (2021).
