= Altıkulaç, Çan =

Village in Turkey

Altıkulaç
- Village
- Location in Turkey Altıkulaç (Marmara)
- Coordinates: 40.0891°N 27.1353°E
- Country: Turkey
- Province: Çanakkale
- District: Çan
- Population (2021): 151
- Time zone: UTC+3 (TRT)

Altıkulaç is a village in the Çan District of Çanakkale Province in Turkey. Its population is 151 (2021).
