= Çelikgürü, Biga =

Village in Turkey

Çelikgürü
- Village
- Location in Turkey Çelikgürü (Marmara)
- Coordinates: 40°20′N 27°03′E
- Country: Turkey
- Province: Çanakkale
- District: Biga
- Population (2021): 312
- Time zone: UTC+3 (TRT)

Çelikgürü is a village in the Biga District of Çanakkale Province in Turkey. Its population is 312 (2021).
