= Şirinköy, Biga =

Village in Turkey

Şirinköy
- Village
- Location in Turkey Şirinköy (Marmara)
- Coordinates: 40.2536°N 27.345°E
- Country: Turkey
- Province: Çanakkale
- District: Biga
- Population (2021): 129
- Time zone: UTC+3 (TRT)

Şirinköy is a village in the Biga District of Çanakkale Province in Turkey. Its population is 129 (2021).
