= Şerbetli, Çan =

Village in Turkey

Şerbetli
- Village
- Location in Turkey Şerbetli (Marmara)
- Coordinates: 40°0′40″N 26°51′45″E
- Country: Turkey
- Province: Çanakkale
- District: Çan
- Population (2021): 132
- Time zone: UTC+3 (TRT)

Şerbetli is a village in the Çan District of Çanakkale Province in Turkey. Its population is 132 (2021).
