= Tokatkırı, Biga =

Village in Turkey

Tokatkırı
- Village
- Location in Turkey Tokatkırı (Marmara)
- Coordinates: 40°20′16″N 27°12′55″E
- Country: Turkey
- Province: Çanakkale
- District: Biga
- Population (2021): 251
- Time zone: UTC+3 (TRT)

Tokatkırı is a village in the Biga District of Çanakkale Province in Turkey. Its population is 251 (2021).
