= Arabakonağı, Biga =

Village in Turkey

Arabakonağı
- Village
- Location in Turkey Arabakonağı (Marmara)
- Coordinates: 40°16′29″N 26°59′58″E
- Country: Turkey
- Province: Çanakkale
- District: Biga
- Population (2021): 83
- Time zone: UTC+3 (TRT)

Arabakonağı is a village in the Biga District of Çanakkale Province in Turkey. Its population is 83 (2021).
