= Harmanlı, Biga =

Village in Turkey

Harmanlı
- Village
- Location in Turkey Harmanlı (Marmara)
- Coordinates: 40.1691°N 27.0609°E
- Country: Turkey
- Province: Çanakkale
- District: Biga
- Population (2021): 255
- Time zone: UTC+3 (TRT)

Harmanlı is a village in the Biga District of Çanakkale Province in Turkey. Its population is 255 (2021).
