= Kanibey, Biga =

Village in Turkey

Kanibey
- Village
- Location in Turkey Kanibey (Marmara)
- Coordinates: 40°17′N 27°20′E
- Country: Turkey
- Province: Çanakkale
- District: Biga
- Population (2021): 293
- Time zone: UTC+3 (TRT)

Kanibey is a village in the Biga District of Çanakkale Province in Turkey. Its population is 293 (2021).
