= Hacıkasım, Çan =

Village in Turkey

Hacıkasım
- Village
- Location in Turkey Hacıkasım (Marmara)
- Coordinates: 39°58′N 26°50′E
- Country: Turkey
- Province: Çanakkale
- District: Çan
- Population (2021): 64
- Time zone: UTC+3 (TRT)

Hacıkasım is a village in the Çan District of Çanakkale Province in Turkey. Its population is 64 (2021).
