= Emirorman, Biga =

Village in Turkey

Emirorman
- Village
- Location in Turkey Emirorman (Marmara)
- Coordinates: 40°16′10″N 27°20′47″E
- Country: Turkey
- Province: Çanakkale
- District: Biga
- Population (2021): 57
- Time zone: UTC+3 (TRT)

Emirorman is a village in the Biga District of Çanakkale Province in Turkey. Its population is 57 (2021).
