= Dereoba, Çan =

Village in Turkey

Dereoba
- Village
- Location in Turkey Dereoba (Marmara)
- Coordinates: 39°56′30″N 26°54′21″E
- Country: Turkey
- Province: Çanakkale
- District: Çan
- Population (2021): 118
- Time zone: UTC+3 (TRT)

Dereoba is a village in the Çan District of Çanakkale Province in Turkey. Its population is 118 (2021).
