= Kaldırımbaşı, Biga =

Village in Turkey

Kaldırımbaşı
- Village
- Location in Turkey Kaldırımbaşı (Marmara)
- Coordinates: 40°15′N 27°12′E
- Country: Turkey
- Province: Çanakkale
- District: Biga
- Population (2021): 657
- Time zone: UTC+3 (TRT)

Kaldırımbaşı is a village in the Biga District of Çanakkale Province in Turkey. Its population is 657 (2021).
