= Kepekli, Biga =

Village in Turkey

Kepekli
- Village
- Location in Turkey Kepekli (Marmara)
- Coordinates: 40°16′26″N 27°30′14″E
- Country: Turkey
- Province: Çanakkale
- District: Biga
- Population (2021): 93
- Time zone: UTC+3 (TRT)

Kepekli is a village in the Biga District of Çanakkale Province in Turkey. Its population is 93 (2021).
