= Hacıköy, Biga =

Hacıköy Аскъэлай
- Village
- Location in Turkey Hacıköy (Marmara)
- Coordinates: 40°17′N 27°17′E
- Country: Turkey
- Province: Çanakkale
- District: Biga
- Elevation: 8 m (26 ft)
- Population (2022): 240
- Time zone: UTC+3 (TRT)
- Postal code: 17200
- Area code: 0286

Hacıköy (Circassian: Аскъэлай Asqelay) is a village in Biga District in Çanakkale Province, Turkey. Its population is 240 (2022).

== History ==
The village was founded by Circassians deported by Russia from the Kuban territory (presently the Republic of Adygea) in the northern Caucasus in 1872. Deportees were moved to the current village after spending about two years in Biga centre. Therefore, the village was named "Maksudiye" (in Ottoman Turkish it means land of ones who gained their purpose). In 1878, 15 households of Turkish descent emigrated from Razgrad, Targovishte, Shumen and Dobruja in Bulgaria. In 1951 another group of same ethnicity emigrated from Omurtag.

The village was named after Hacı Bey who was a figure in Turkish Independence War.

== Circassian families from the village ==
Circassian deportees who settled in the village has Circassian surnames listed below.

- Aseqаlequ (Circassian:Асэкъалэкъу)
- Bğuаṩe (Circassian:Бгъуашэ)
- Biberdıqu (Circassian:Бибэрдыкъу)
- Bleğoĵ (Circassian:Блэгъожъ)
- Bılĥuĵqo (Circassian:Былхъужъкъо)
- Beĥımqo (Circassian:Бэхъымкъо)
- Ğuḉeł (Circassian:ГъукIэлI)
- Cаş̂uqu (Circassian:Джашъукъу)
- Yewıtx (Circassian:Еуытх)
- Jıtımqo (Circassian:Жьытымкъо)
- Qаnsаn (Circassian:Къансан)
- Qeĥu (Circassian:Къэхъу)
- Qoṩk (Circassian:Къошк)
- Quremqo (Circassian:Къурэмкъо)
- Leğuçeşqo (Circassian:Лэгъучэщкъо)
- Leğunş̂awqu (Circassian:Лэгъуншъаукъу)
- Ĺeśerıqu (Circassian:Лъэцэрыкъу)
- Łıĥuḉ (Circassian:ЛIыхъукI)
- Mıselqo (Circassian:Мысэлкъо)
- Mesĺаqo (Circassian:Мэслъакъо)
- Nawqo (Circassian:Наукъо)
- Nаṩĥu (Circassian:Нашхъу)
- Neğey (Circassian:Нэгый / Нэгэй)
- Nexаy (Circassian:Нэхай)
- Neş̂uqu (Circassian:Нэшъукъу)
- Peneş̂u (Circassian:Пэнэшъу)
- Pereçqo (Circassian:Пэрэчкъо)
- Ṕаtımqo (Circassian:ПIатымкъо)
- Sаtrаlqo (Circassian:Сатралкъо)
- Tewç̌oj (Circassian:Теуцожь)
- Tıtıwqu (Circassian:Тытыукъу)
- Tımıjeku (Circassian:Тымыжьэкъу)
- Xesаrıqu (Circassian:Хэсарыкъу)
- Ĥuаĵ (Circassian:Хъуажъ)
- Hаbıy (Circassian:Хьабый)
- Hаcumаr (Circassian:Хьаджумар)
- Hаcequ (Circassian:Хьаджэкъу)
- Hаḉesqo (Circassian:ХьакIэскъо)
- Hаlıqu (Circassian:Хьалыкъу)
- Hаneğequ (Circassian:Хьанэгъэкъу)
- Hаsаnequ (Circassian:Хьасанэкъу)
- Hаç̌uğqo (Circassian:Хьацугъкъо)
- Hаşrıqu (Circassian:Хьащрыкъу)
- S̋eğoş́u (Circassian:ЦIэгъошIу)
- S̋eğoṩ (Circassian:ЦIэгъош)
- Ç̇erаḱo (Circassian:ЧIэракIо)
- Ṩıwmаf (Circassian:Шыумаф)
- Şаpĥo (Circassian:Щапхъо)
- Aş̂ıne (Circassian:Iашъынэ)
- İberqo (Circassian:Iибэркъо)
- Ceguаḱu (Circassian:ДжэгуакIу)

== Culture ==
Adyghe Khabze (Circassian: Адыгэ Хабзэ) is the native Circassian religion, philosophy and worldview, it is the epitome of Circassian culture and tradition having deeply shaped the ethical values of the Adyghe. It is their code of honour and is based on mutual respect and above all requires responsibility, discipline and self-control. Adyghe Xabze functions as the Circassian unwritten law yet was highly regulated and adhered to in the past. The Code requires that all Circassians are taught courage, reliability and generosity. Greed, desire for possessions, wealth and ostentation are considered disgraceful ("Yemiku" Circassian:ЕмыкӀу) by the Xabze code. In accordance with Xabze, hospitality was and is particularly pronounced among the Circassians. A guest is not only a guest of the host family, but equally a guest of the whole village and clan. Even enemies are regarded as guests if they enter the home and being hospitable to them as one would with any other guest is a sacred duty.

Circassians consider the host to be like a slave to the guest in that the host is expected to tend to the guest's every need and want. A guest must never be permitted to labour in any way, this is considered a major disgrace on the host.

Every Circassian arises when someone enters the room, providing a place for the person entering and allowing the newcomer to speak before everyone else during the conversation. In the presence of elders and women respectful conversation and conduct are essential. Disputes are stopped in the presence of women and domestic disputes are never continued in the presence of guests. A woman can request disputing families to reconcile and they must comply with her request. A key figure in Circassian culture is the person known as the "T'hamade or T'hamate" (Circassian: Тхьэмадэ - Тхьэматэ), who is often an elder but also the person who carries the responsibility for functions like weddings or circumcision parties. This person must always comply with all the rules of Xabze in all areas of his life.

== Population ==
Historical population
Year	Pop.	±% p.a.
1997	381	—
2007	342	−1.07%
2012	321	−1.26%
2017	293	−1.81%
2022	240	−3.91%
Source: 1997 census and TÜIK (2007-2022)

== Facilities ==
The economy of the village depends on agriculture and animal husbandry. The village has potable water and sanitary sewers. There is no PTT branch office but there is an agent.
