= Akkayrak, Biga =

Village in Turkey

Akkayrak
- Village
- Location in Turkey Akkayrak (Marmara)
- Coordinates: 40°10′12″N 27°13′01″E
- Country: Turkey
- Province: Çanakkale
- District: Biga
- Population (2021): 66
- Time zone: UTC+3 (TRT)

Akkayrak is a village in the Biga District of Çanakkale Province in Turkey. Its population is 66 (2021).
