= Derenti, Çan =

Village in Turkey

Derenti
- Village
- Location in Turkey Derenti (Marmara)
- Coordinates: 40°00′N 27°05′E
- Country: Turkey
- Province: Çanakkale
- District: Çan
- Population (2021): 636
- Time zone: UTC+3 (TRT)

Derenti is a village in the Çan District of Çanakkale Province in Turkey. Its population is 636 (2021).
