= Eceabat =

Eceabat Maydos
- Municipality
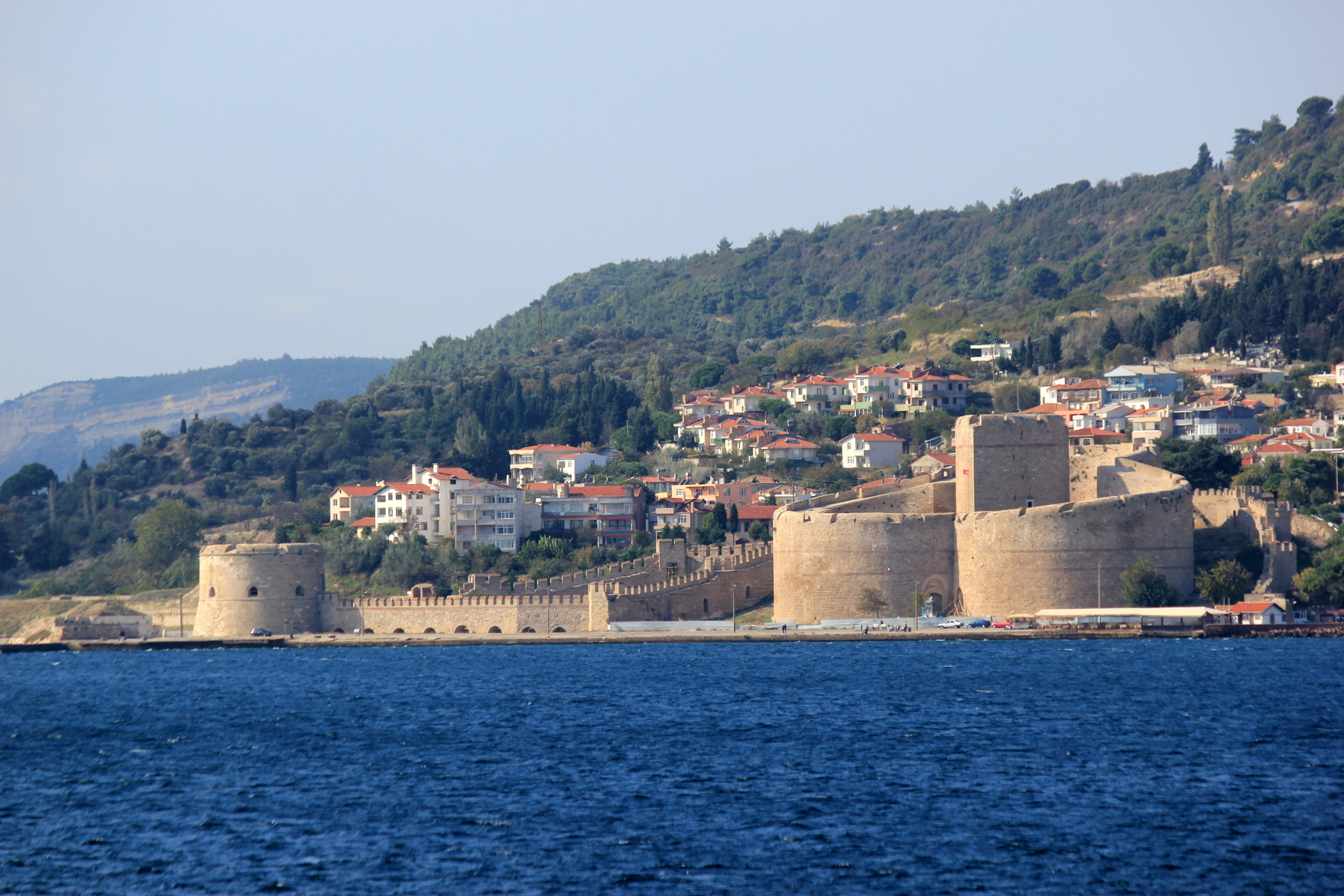
- Kilitbahir Castle built by Mehmed II Fatih in 1452

- Location within Turkey Location within Marmara
- Country: Turkey
- Province: Çanakkale
- District: Eceabat

Government
  - Mayor: Saim Zileli (CHP)
- Elevation: 0 m (0 ft)
- Population (2021): 5,636
- Time zone: UTC+3 (TRT)
- Area code: 0286
- Website: www.eceabat.bel.tr

Eceabat (Turkish: [eˈdʒeːabat]), formerly Maydos (Greek: Μάδυτος, romanized: Mádytos; now usually Ετζέαμπατ, Etzéampat), is a small town in Çanakkale Province in the Marmara region of Turkey, located on the eastern shore of the Gallipoli Peninsula, facing the Dardanelles Strait. It is the seat of Eceabat District. Its population is 5,636 (2021). The town lies at sea level. It is an almost entirely modern town.

Eceabat is the departure point for the annual swim across the Hellespont to Çanakkale on the other side of the Dardanelles Strait.

Eceabat is the nearest town to the World War I Gallipoli Campaign battlefield sites, as well as to the cemeteries and memorials to the more than 120,000 Turkish, British, French, Australian and New Zealand soldiers killed during the campaign. This has led to its becoming a major tourism centre, especially around 18 March and 25 April (ANZAC Day) when the two different sides of the struggle commemorate their roles in what happened.

== Name ==
The origin of Eceabat's name are disputed. According to one theory, it might be a compound of the given name Ece and abat 'flourishing, prosperous [place]', after an Ottoman commander who helped in the conquest of the region in 1354, under Süleyman Pasha, and became the local bey. Alternatively, it might have originated from the Arabic military term ḥijābāt (حجابات), which means the most forward command point from the battlefield; if so, the meaning might explain the change from the original Madytos.

== Attractions ==
- Kilisetepe Mound in Eceabat town covers the site of the original Madytos. The Greek Orthodox church that used to stand on it was demolished in 1923.
- Kilitbahir Castle, located 11km south of Eceabat, is an architectural masterpiece, commissioned by Ottoman Sultan Mehmed II in 1462 after the conquest of Istanbul. Süleyman the Magnificent added the Sarı Kule, a tower of large cut stones, to the original fortifications. The castle's heart-shaped layout is unique. The smooth rubble walls were not given great importance but the clover-shaped three courtyards of the inner courtyard were still sheltered. The inner castle has seven floors. Bunkers were added to the site during the Gallipoli campaign. There is a small military museum inside the castle.
- Ancient Sestos was on the site of the village of Yalova, 4 km from Eceabat. It was established to the south of Akbaş port. Its stones were reused in the building of Kilitbahir Castle.
- Seddülbahir Castle was built in 1659 by Mustafa Ağa, the architect of Frenk Ahmed Pasha, during the reign of Mehmed IV.
- Bigali Castle is located 5 km from Eceabat. Work on it began in 1807 during the reign of Selim III; it was completed during the reign of Mahmud II. Stones taken from the lost city of Sestos were used to build the castle.
