= Hacılar, Çan =

Village in Turkey

Hacılar
- Village
- Location in Turkey Hacılar (Marmara)
- Coordinates: 40.055°N 27.1144°E
- Country: Turkey
- Province: Çanakkale
- District: Çan
- Population (2021): 472
- Time zone: UTC+3 (TRT)

Hacılar is a village in the Çan District of Çanakkale Province in Turkey. Its population is 472 (2021).
