= Türkbakacak, Biga =

Village in Turkey

Türkbakacak
- Village
- Location in Turkey Türkbakacak (Marmara)
- Coordinates: 40°11′N 27°05′E
- Country: Turkey
- Province: Çanakkale
- District: Biga
- Population (2021): 108
- Time zone: UTC+3 (TRT)

Türkbakacak is a village in the Biga District of Çanakkale Province in Turkey. Its population is 108 (2021).
