= Gümüşçay =

- Municipality
- Location in Turkey Gümüşçay (Marmara)
- Coordinates: 40°17′N 27°17′E
- Country: Turkey
- Province: Çanakkale
- District: Biga
- Elevation: 8 m (26 ft)
- Population (2021): 2,123
- Time zone: UTC+3 (TRT)
- Postal code: 17200
- Area code: 0286

Gümüşçay (former Güvercinli) is a town (belde) in the Biga District, Çanakkale Province, Turkey. Its population is 2,123 (2021). It is situated in the Anatolian portion of the province 10 kilometres (6.2 mi) south of Marmara Sea coast. The distance to Biga is 6 kilometres (3.7 mi). The settlement was an Ottoman district center named Güvercinli. The mosque of Gümüşçay, the Nasuh Çelebi mosque was built during the reign of Mahmut I (1730-1754). The settlement was declared a seat of township in 1949. The main economic sector of the town is agriculture.
