= Gemicikırı, Biga =

Village in Turkey

Gemicikırı
- Village
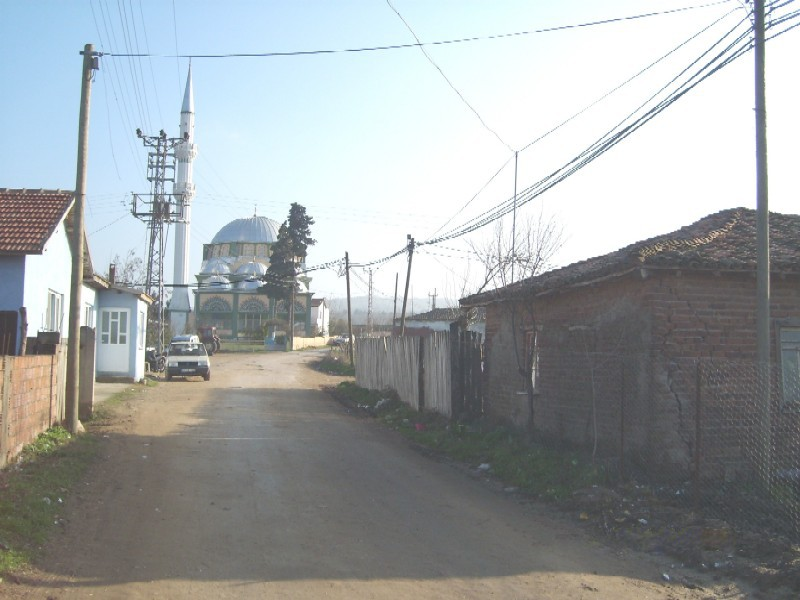

- Location within Turkey Location within Marmara
- Country: Turkey
- Province: Çanakkale
- District: Biga
- Population (2021): 326
- Time zone: UTC+3 (TRT)

Gemicikırı is a village in the Biga District of Çanakkale Province in Turkey. Its population is 326 (2021).
