= Bakacaklıçiftliği, Biga =

Village in Turkey

Bakacaklıçiftliği
- Village
- Location in Turkey Bakacaklıçiftliği (Marmara)
- Coordinates: 40°11′N 27°14′E
- Country: Turkey
- Province: Çanakkale
- District: Biga
- Population (2021): 104
- Time zone: UTC+3 (TRT)

Bakacaklıçiftliği is a village in the Biga District of Çanakkale Province in Turkey. Its population is 104 (2021).
