= Bozguç, Çan =

Village in Turkey

Bozguç
- Village
- Location in Turkey Bozguç (Marmara)
- Coordinates: 40°06′23″N 27°03′54″E
- Country: Turkey
- Province: Çanakkale
- District: Çan
- Population (2021): 583
- Time zone: UTC+3 (TRT)

Bozguç is a village in the Çan District of Çanakkale Province in Turkey. Its population is 583 (2021).
