= Kocayayla, Çan =

Village in Turkey

Kocayayla
- Village
- Location in Turkey Kocayayla (Marmara)
- Coordinates: 40°05′N 26°59′E
- Country: Turkey
- Province: Çanakkale
- District: Çan
- Population (2021): 989
- Time zone: UTC+3 (TRT)

Kocayayla is a village in the Çan District of Çanakkale Province in Turkey. Its population is 989 (2021).
