= Çamköy, Çan =

Village in Turkey

Çamköy
- Village
- Location in Turkey Çamköy (Marmara)
- Coordinates: 39.9961°N 26.8183°E
- Country: Turkey
- Province: Çanakkale
- District: Çan
- Population (2021): 51
- Time zone: UTC+3 (TRT)

Çamköy is a village in the Çan District of Çanakkale Province in Turkey. Its population is 51 (2021).
