= Örtülüce, Biga =

Village in Turkey

Örtülüce
- Village
- Location in Turkey Örtülüce (Marmara)
- Coordinates: 40°22′54″N 27°12′20″E
- Country: Turkey
- Province: Çanakkale
- District: Biga
- Population (2021): 1,229
- Time zone: UTC+3 (TRT)

Örtülüce is a village in the Biga District of Çanakkale Province in Turkey. Its population is 1,229 (2021).
