= Akköprü, Biga =

Village in Turkey

Akköprü
- Village
- Location in Turkey Akköprü (Marmara)
- Coordinates: 40.2688°N 27.2124°E
- Country: Turkey
- Province: Çanakkale
- District: Biga
- Population (2021): 62
- Time zone: UTC+3 (TRT)

Akköprü is a village in the Biga District of Çanakkale Province in Turkey. Its population is 62 (2021).

The village is located near the Biga Çayı River (known in ancient times as the Granikos) in the Biga district of Çanakkale, a few kilometers from the town center of Biga. It lies in northwestern Turkey, on the Asian side of the country.
