= Değirmencik, Biga =

Village in Turkey

Değirmencik
- Village
- Country: Turkey
- Province: Çanakkale
- District: Biga
- Population (2021): 285
- Time zone: UTC+3 (TRT)

Değirmencik is a village in the Biga District of Çanakkale Province in Turkey. Its population is 285 (2021).
