= Küçükpaşa, Çan =

Village in Turkey

Küçükpaşa
- Village
- Location in Turkey Küçükpaşa (Marmara)
- Coordinates: 39°59′N 26°58′E
- Country: Turkey
- Province: Çanakkale
- District: Çan
- Population (2021): 99
- Time zone: UTC+3 (TRT)

Küçükpaşa is a village in the Çan District of Çanakkale Province in Turkey. Its population is 99 (2021).
