= Camialan, Biga =

Village in Turkey

Camialan
- Village
- Location in Turkey Camialan (Marmara)
- Coordinates: 40°10′14″N 27°21′37″E
- Country: Turkey
- Province: Çanakkale
- District: Biga
- Population (2021): 56
- Time zone: UTC+3 (TRT)

Camialan is a village in the Biga District of Çanakkale Province in Turkey. Its population is 56 (2021).
