= Cihadiye, Biga =

Village in Turkey

Cihadiye
- Village
- Country: Turkey
- Province: Çanakkale
- District: Biga
- Population (2021): 111
- Time zone: UTC+3 (TRT)

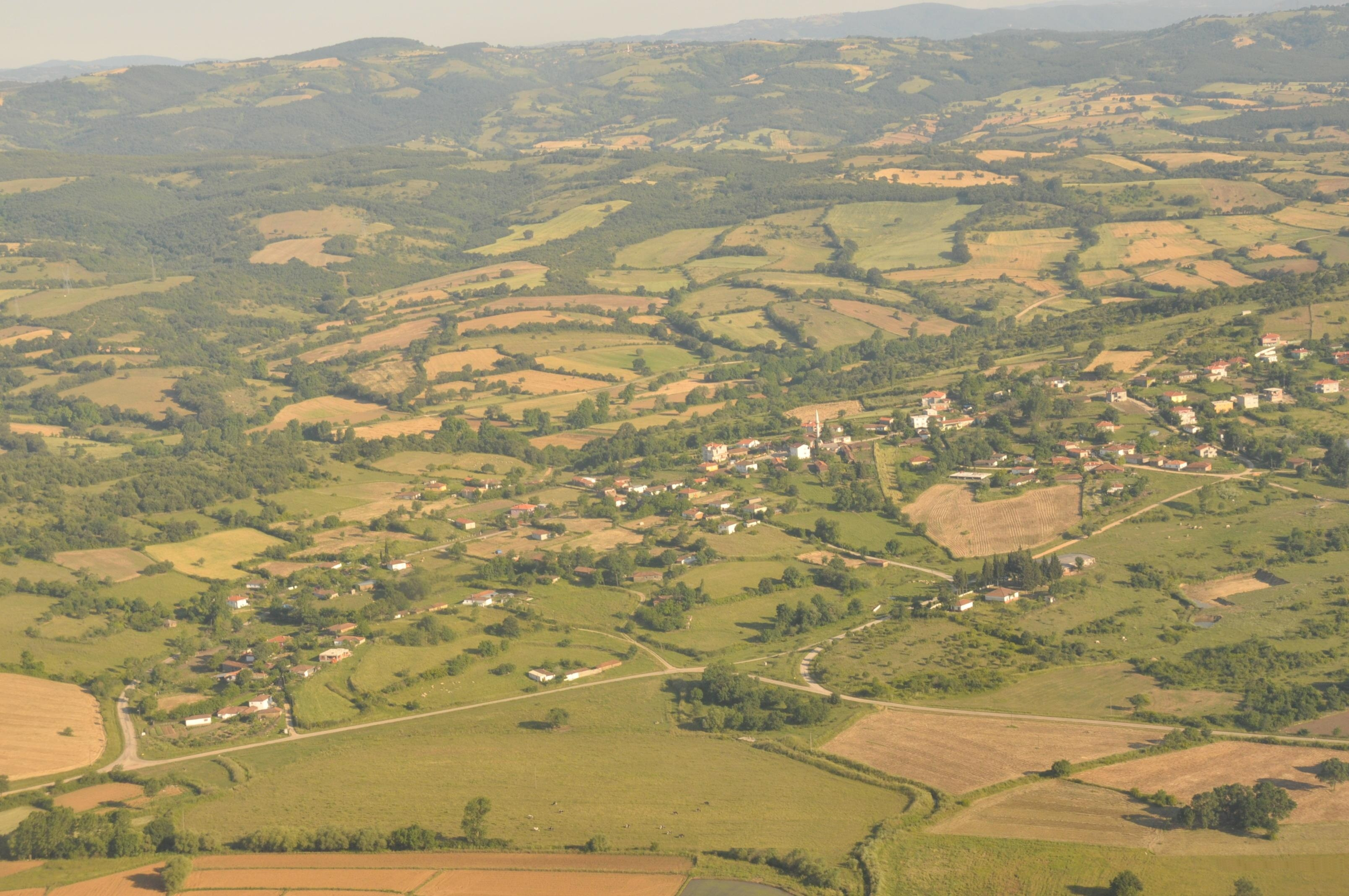

Cihadiye (Adyghe: Тыгъужъаблэ, romanized: Tuġujhablə, lit. 'Town of wolves') is a village in the Biga District of Çanakkale Province in Turkey. Its population is 111 (2021). The village is mostly made up of ethnic Circassians from the Bzhedug tribe.

== History ==
The village was founded in 1881 by about 20 Circassian families (that had possibly migrated from the Balkans during the Russo-Turkish War (1877–1878)) who fled the Kuban basin following the Circassian genocide. The name of the village was first recorded as Tığujkuey (Adyghe: Тыгъужькъуей, lit. 'Village of wolves') in 1920 and later as Buzağılık in 1960.

=== Turkish War of Independence ===
After Anzavur Ahmed Pasha was killed in an ambush in a nearby village, the residents of Cihadiye buried his body and built a grave for him.
