= Beşyol, Eceabat =

Village in Turkey

Beşyol
- Village
- Location in Turkey Beşyol (Marmara)
- Coordinates: 40.3276°N 26.3465°E
- Country: Turkey
- Province: Çanakkale
- District: Eceabat
- Population (2021): 177
- Time zone: UTC+3 (TRT)

Beşyol is a village in the Eceabat District of Çanakkale Province in Turkey. Its population is 177 (2021).
