= Yolindi, Biga =

Village in Turkey

Yolindi
- Village
- Country: Turkey
- Province: Çanakkale
- District: Biga
- Population (2021): 829
- Time zone: UTC+3 (TRT)

Yolindi is a village in the Biga District of Çanakkale Province in Turkey. Its population is 829 (2021).
