= Cicikler, Çan =

Village in Turkey

Cicikler
- Village
- Location in Turkey Cicikler (Marmara)
- Coordinates: 39°55′N 26°55′E
- Country: Turkey
- Province: Çanakkale
- District: Çan
- Population (2021): 119
- Time zone: UTC+3 (TRT)

Cicikler is a village in the Çan District of Çanakkale Province in Turkey. Its population is 119 (2021).
