= Kapanbeleni, Biga =

Village in Turkey

Kapanbeleni
- Village
- Location in Turkey Kapanbeleni (Marmara)
- Coordinates: 40°09′N 27°12′E
- Country: Turkey
- Province: Çanakkale
- District: Biga
- Population (2021): 118
- Time zone: UTC+3 (TRT)

Kapanbeleni is a village in the Biga District of Çanakkale Province in Turkey. Its population is 118 (2021).
