= Zeybekçayırı, Çan =

Village in Turkey

Zeybekçayırı
- Village
- Location in Turkey Zeybekçayırı (Marmara)
- Coordinates: 39°53′N 27°01′E
- Country: Turkey
- Province: Çanakkale
- District: Çan
- Population (2021): 107
- Time zone: UTC+3 (TRT)

Zeybekçayırı is a village in the Çan District of Çanakkale Province in Turkey. Its population is 107 (2021).
