= Geredelli, Biga =

Village in Turkey

Geredelli
- Village
- Country: Turkey
- Province: Çanakkale
- District: Biga
- Population (2021): 87
- Time zone: UTC+3 (TRT)

Geredelli is a village in the Biga District of Çanakkale Province in Turkey. Its population is 87 (2021).
