= Doğaca, Çan =

Village in Turkey

Doğaca
- Village
- Location in Turkey Doğaca (Marmara)
- Coordinates: 40°06′N 27°01′E
- Country: Turkey
- Province: Çanakkale
- District: Çan
- Population (2021): 269
- Time zone: UTC+3 (TRT)

Doğaca is a village in the Çan District of Çanakkale Province in Turkey. Its population is 269 (2021).
