= Paşaçayı, Biga =

Village in Turkey

Paşaçayı
- Village
- Location in Turkey Paşaçayı (Marmara)
- Coordinates: 40°12′N 26°58′E
- Country: Turkey
- Province: Çanakkale
- District: Biga
- Population (2021): 156
- Time zone: UTC+3 (TRT)

Paşaçayı is a village in the Biga District of Çanakkale Province in Turkey. Its population is 156 (2021).
