= Karaağaç, Biga =

Village in Turkey

Karaağaç
- Village
- Location in Turkey Karaağaç (Marmara)
- Coordinates: 40.2323°N 26.9744°E
- Country: Turkey
- Province: Çanakkale
- District: Biga
- Population (2021): 149
- Time zone: UTC+3 (TRT)

Karaağaç is a village in the Biga District of Çanakkale Province in Turkey. Its population is 149 (2021).
