= Aziziye, Biga =

Village in Turkey

Aziziye
- Village
- Location in Turkey Aziziye (Marmara)
- Coordinates: 40.2597°N 27.1906°E
- Country: Turkey
- Province: Çanakkale
- District: Biga
- Population (2021): 67
- Time zone: UTC+3 (TRT)

Aziziye is a village in the Biga District of Çanakkale Province in Turkey. Its population is 67 (2021).
