= Hacıpehlivan, Biga =

Village in Turkey

Hacıpehlivan
- Village
- Location in Turkey Hacıpehlivan (Marmara)
- Coordinates: 40°15′N 27°25′E
- Country: Turkey
- Province: Çanakkale
- District: Biga
- Population (2021): 392
- Time zone: UTC+3 (TRT)

Hacıpehlivan is a village in the Biga District of Çanakkale Province in Turkey. Its population is 392 (2021).
