= Alibeyçiftliği, Çan =

Village in Turkey

Alibeyçiftliği
- Village
- Location in Turkey Alibeyçiftliği (Marmara)
- Coordinates: 40°00′N 26°53′E
- Country: Turkey
- Province: Çanakkale
- District: Çan
- Population (2021): 78
- Time zone: UTC+3 (TRT)

Alibeyçiftliği is a village in the Çan District of Çanakkale Province in Turkey. Its population is 78 (2021).
