= Gürgendere, Biga =

Village in Turkey

Gürgendere
- Village
- Location in Turkey Gürgendere (Marmara)
- Coordinates: 40°17′N 27°01′E
- Country: Turkey
- Province: Çanakkale
- District: Biga
- Population (2021): 94
- Time zone: UTC+3 (TRT)

Gürgendere is a village in the Biga District of Çanakkale Province in Turkey. Its population is 94 (2021).
