= Behramlı, Eceabat =

Village in Turkey

Behramlı
- Village
- Location in Turkey Behramlı (Marmara)
- Coordinates: 40.1282°N 26.2919°E
- Country: Turkey
- Province: Çanakkale
- District: Eceabat
- Population (2021): 425
- Time zone: UTC+3 (TRT)

Behramlı is a village in the Eceabat District of Çanakkale Province in Turkey. Its population is 425 (2021).
