= Akpınar, Biga =

Village in Turkey

Akpınar
- Village
- Location in Turkey Akpınar (Marmara)
- Coordinates: 40.2318°N 27.2036°E
- Country: Turkey
- Province: Çanakkale
- District: Biga
- Population (2021): 76
- Time zone: UTC+3 (TRT)

Akpınar is a village in the Biga District of Çanakkale Province in Turkey. Its population is 76 (2021).
