= Kazmalı, Biga =

Village in Turkey

Kazmalı
- Village
- Location in Turkey Kazmalı (Marmara)
- Coordinates: 40°14′47″N 26°58′37″E
- Country: Turkey
- Province: Çanakkale
- District: Biga
- Population (2021): 96
- Time zone: UTC+3 (TRT)

Kazmalı is a village in the Biga District of Çanakkale Province in Turkey. Its population is 96 (2021).
