= Keçiağılı, Çan =

Village in Turkey

Keçiağılı
- Village
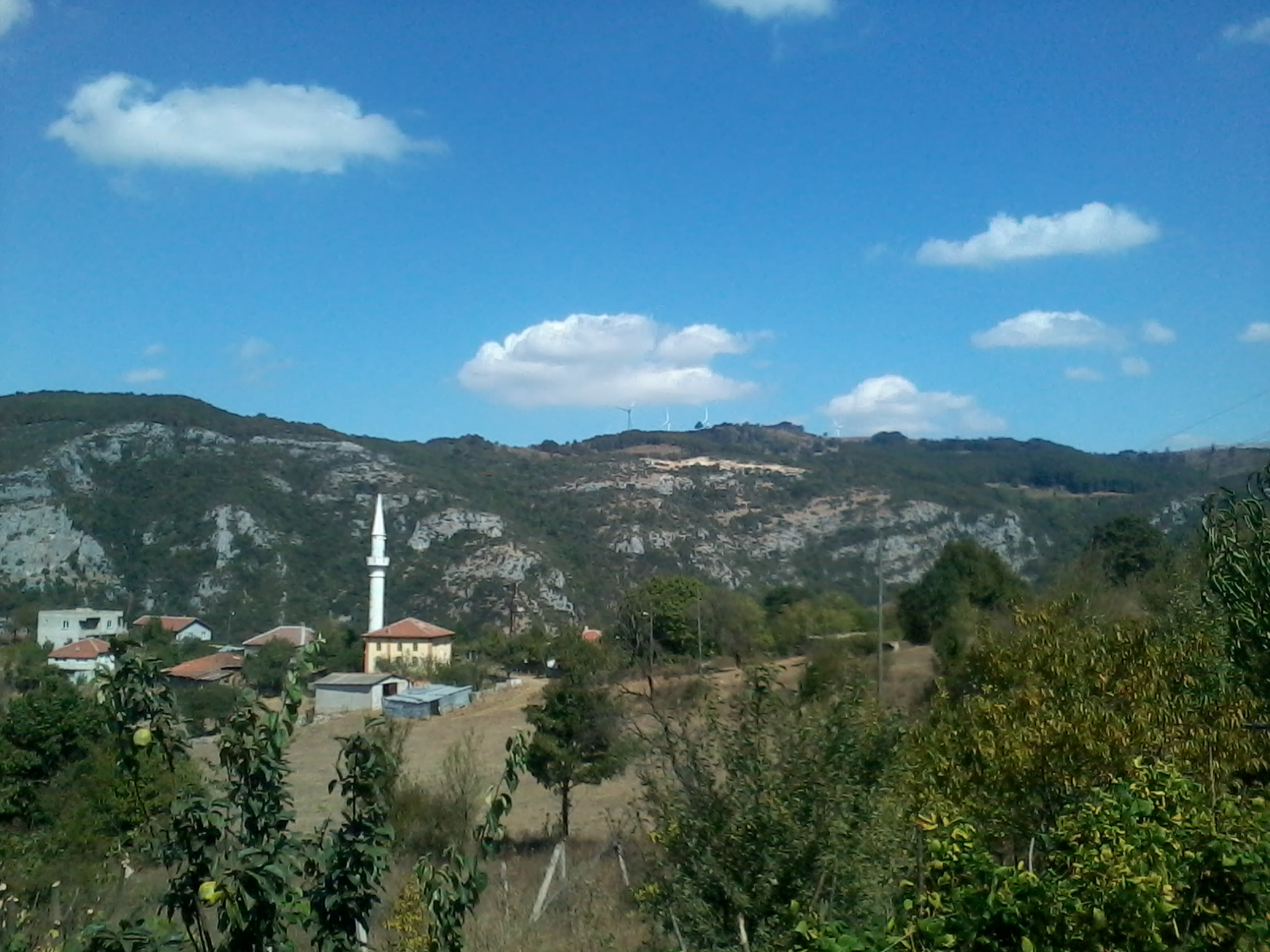

- Location within Turkey Location within Marmara
- Country: Turkey
- Province: Çanakkale
- District: Çan
- Population (2021): 108
- Time zone: UTC+3 (TRT)

Keçiağılı is a village in the Çan District of Çanakkale Province in Turkey. Its population is 108 (2021).
