= Bahadırlı, Çan =

Village in Turkey

Bahadırlı
- Village
- Location in Turkey Bahadırlı (Marmara)
- Coordinates: 40.0325°N 26.9150°E
- Country: Turkey
- Province: Çanakkale
- District: Çan
- Population (2021): 273
- Time zone: UTC+3 (TRT)

Bahadırlı is a village in the Çan District of Çanakkale Province in Turkey. Its population is 273 (2021).
