= Çınardere, Biga =

Village in Turkey

Çınardere
- Village
- Country: Turkey
- Province: Çanakkale
- District: Biga
- Population (2021): 110
- Time zone: UTC+3 (TRT)

Çınardere is a village in the Biga District of Çanakkale Province in Turkey. Its population is 110 (2021).

== See also ==
- Hermaion
