= Ahmetler, Biga =

Village in Turkey

Ahmetler
- Village
- Location in Turkey Ahmetler (Marmara)
- Coordinates: 40.1623°N 26.9224°E
- Country: Turkey
- Province: Çanakkale
- District: Biga
- Population (2021): 218
- Time zone: UTC+3 (TRT)

Ahmetler is a village in the Biga District of Çanakkale Province in Turkey. Its population is 218 (2021).
