= Ilıcabaşı, Biga =

Village in Turkey

Ilıcabaşı
- Village
- Location in Turkey Ilıcabaşı (Marmara)
- Coordinates: 40.0872°N 27.2334°E
- Country: Turkey
- Province: Çanakkale
- District: Biga
- Population (2021): 55
- Time zone: UTC+3 (TRT)

Ilıcabaşı is a village in the Biga District of Çanakkale Province in Turkey. Its population is 55 (2021).
