= Hacıhüseyinyaylası, Biga =

Village in Turkey

Hacıhüseyinyaylası
- Village
- Location in Turkey Hacıhüseyinyaylası (Marmara)
- Coordinates: 40°20′16″N 27°10′38″E
- Country: Turkey
- Province: Çanakkale
- District: Biga
- Population (2021): 331
- Time zone: UTC+3 (TRT)

Hacıhüseyinyaylası is a village in the Biga District of Çanakkale Province in Turkey. Its population is 331 (2021).
