= Kozçeşme, Biga =

Village in Turkey

Kozçeşme
- Village
- Location in Turkey Kozçeşme (Marmara)
- Coordinates: 40°16′N 27°02′E
- Country: Turkey
- Province: Çanakkale
- District: Biga
- Population (2021): 799
- Time zone: UTC+3 (TRT)

Kozçeşme is a village in the Biga District of Çanakkale Province in Turkey. Its population is 799 (2021). Before the 2013 reorganisation, it was a town (belde).
