= Danapınar, Çan =

Village in Turkey

Danapınar
- Village
- Location in Turkey Danapınar (Marmara)
- Coordinates: 40°08′N 27°01′E
- Country: Turkey
- Province: Çanakkale
- District: Çan
- Population (2021): 369
- Time zone: UTC+3 (TRT)

Danapınar is a village in the Çan District of Çanakkale Province in Turkey. Its population is 369 (2021).
