= İdriskoru, Biga =

Village in Turkey

İdriskoru
- Village
- Location within Turkey Location within Marmara
- Coordinates: 40°15′N 27°17′E
- Country: Turkey
- Province: Çanakkale
- District: Biga
- Population (2021): 568
- Time zone: UTC+3 (TRT)

İdriskoru is a village in the Biga District of Çanakkale Province in Turkey. Its population is 568 (2021).

== Population ==
Population by year
2020	547
2019	539
2018	538
2017	551
2016	569
2015	571
2014	591
2013	621
2012	607
2011	634
2010	662
2009	673
2008	653
2007	1,646
2000	1,147
1990	656
1985	1,263
