= Küçük Tavşan Adası =

Pair of adjacent Turkish islands in the Aegean Sea

Coordinates: 37.166°N 27.371°E

Küçük Tavşan island (literally "little rabbit island") is a Turkish island located in the Aegean Sea north of Gölköy, in Bodrum.
