= Kaşıkçıoba, Biga =

Village in Turkey

Kaşıkçıoba
- Village
- Location in Turkey Kaşıkçıoba (Marmara)
- Coordinates: 40°12′48″N 27°16′47″E
- Country: Turkey
- Province: Çanakkale
- District: Biga
- Population (2021): 143
- Time zone: UTC+3 (TRT)

Kaşıkçıoba is a village in the Biga District of Çanakkale Province in Turkey. Its population is 143 (2021).
