= Kocadere, Eceabat =

Village in Turkey

Kocadere
- Village
- Country: Turkey
- Province: Çanakkale
- District: Eceabat
- Population (2021): 62
- Time zone: UTC+3 (TRT)

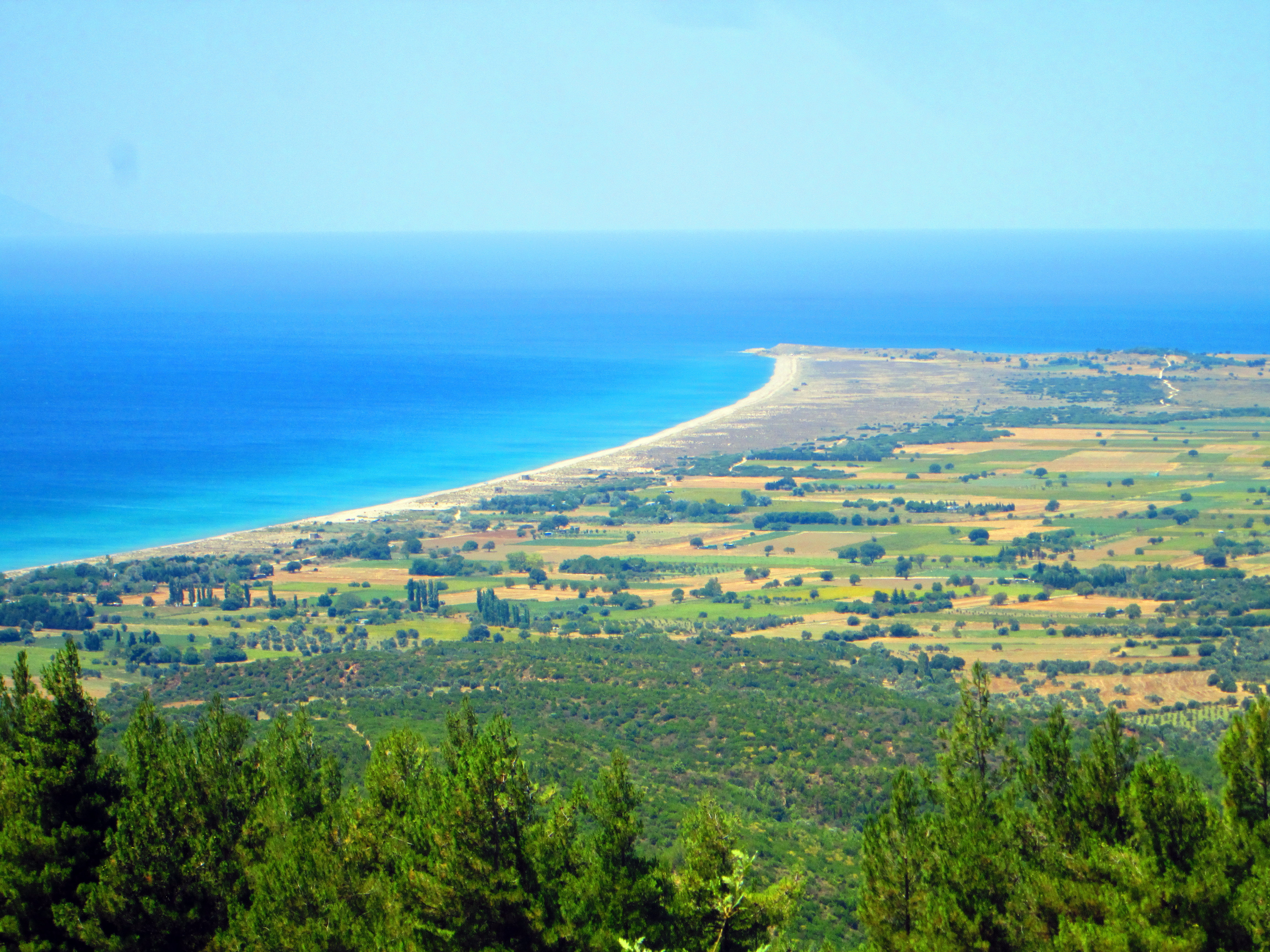

Kocadere is a village in the Eceabat District of Çanakkale Province in Turkey. Its population is 62 (2021).
