= Sinekçi, Biga =

Village in Turkey

Sinekçi
- Village
- Location in Turkey Sinekçi (Marmara)
- Coordinates: 40°16′N 27°24′E
- Country: Turkey
- Province: Çanakkale
- District: Biga
- Population (2021): 336
- Time zone: UTC+3 (TRT)

Sinekçi is a village in the Biga District of Çanakkale Province in Turkey. Its population is 336 (2021).
