= Terzialan =

- Municipality
- Interactive map of Terzialan
- Coordinates: 39°58′N 27°01′E
- Province: Çanakkale
- District: Çan
- Elevation: 140 m (460 ft)

Population (2021)
  - Total: 1,801
- Postal code: 17410
- Area code: 0286

Terzialan is a town (belde) in the Çan District, Çanakkale Province, Turkey. Its population is 1,801 (2021). It is 9 kilometres (5.6 mi) south of Çan and 75 kilometres (47 mi) east of Çanakkale. The settlement was founded by the Muslim refugees from Eskicuma village near Razgrad, Bulgaria during the Russo-Turkish War (1877-1878). The former name of the settlement was Çakmabayır. But in the 20th century it was named Terzialan, which means "tailor's area" referring to itinerant tailors who performed in the settlement during the market days. In 1994, a nearby village named Süleköy was merged into Terzialan and Terzialan was declared a seat of township.
