= Eskibalıklı, Biga =

Village in Turkey

Eskibalıklı
- Village
- Location in Turkey Eskibalıklı (Marmara)
- Coordinates: 40°21′N 27°06′E
- Country: Turkey
- Province: Çanakkale
- District: Biga
- Population (2021): 208
- Time zone: UTC+3 (TRT)

Eskibalıklı is a village in the Biga District of Çanakkale Province in Turkey. Its population is 208 (2021).
