= Yeniçiftlik, Biga =

Village in Turkey

Yeniçiftlik
- Village
- Location in Turkey Yeniçiftlik (Marmara)
- Coordinates: 40°18′6″N 27°10′55″E
- Country: Turkey
- Province: Çanakkale
- District: Biga
- Population (2021): 1,090
- Time zone: UTC+3 (TRT)

Yeniçiftlik is a village in the Biga District of Çanakkale Province in Turkey. Its population is 1,090 (2021). Before the 2013 reorganisation, it was a town (belde).
