= Bezirganlar, Biga =

Village in Turkey

Bezirganlar
- Village
- Location in Turkey Bezirganlar (Marmara)
- Coordinates: 40.1749°N 26.9896°E
- Country: Turkey
- Province: Çanakkale
- District: Biga
- Population (2021): 116
- Time zone: UTC+3 (TRT)

Bezirganlar is a village in the Biga District of Çanakkale Province in Turkey. Its population is 116 (2021).
