= Ahlatlıburun, Çan =

Village in Turkey

Ahlatlıburun
- Village
- Location in Turkey Ahlatlıburun (Marmara)
- Coordinates: 40°0′45″N 26°52′30″E
- Country: Turkey
- Province: Çanakkale
- District: Çan
- Population (2021): 244
- Time zone: UTC+3 (TRT)

Ahlatlıburun is a village in the Çan District of Çanakkale Province in Turkey. Its population is 244 (2021).
