= Yuvalar, Çan =

Village in Turkey

Yuvalar
- Village
- Location in Turkey Yuvalar (Marmara)
- Coordinates: 40°3′18″N 27°4′48″E
- Country: Turkey
- Province: Çanakkale
- District: Çan
- Population (2021): 263
- Time zone: UTC+3 (TRT)

Yuvalar is a village in the Çan District of Çanakkale Province in Turkey. Its population is 263 (2021).
