= Büyükpaşa, Çan =

Village in Turkey

Büyükpaşa
- Village
- Location in Turkey Büyükpaşa (Marmara)
- Coordinates: 39°59′24″N 26°57′31″E
- Country: Turkey
- Province: Çanakkale
- District: Çan
- Population (2021): 182
- Time zone: UTC+3 (TRT)

Büyükpaşa is a village in the Çan District of Çanakkale Province in Turkey. Its population is 182 (2021).
