= Koruoba, Biga =

Village in Turkey

Koruoba
- Village
- Location in Turkey Koruoba (Marmara)
- Coordinates: 40°15′08″N 27°26′22″E
- Country: Turkey
- Province: Çanakkale
- District: Biga
- Population (2021): 330
- Time zone: UTC+3 (TRT)

Koruoba is a village in the Biga District of Çanakkale Province in Turkey. Its population is 330 (2021).
