= Çakırlı, Tarsus =

Çakırlı
- Neighbourhood
- Location in Turkey
- Coordinates: 37°01′N 34°44′E
- Country: Turkey
- Province: Mersin
- District: Tarsus
- Elevation: 305 m (1,001 ft)
- Population (2022): 787
- Time zone: UTC+3 (TRT)
- Area code: 0324

Çakırlı is a neighbourhood in the municipality and district of Tarsus, Mersin Province, Turkey. Its population is 787 (2022). It is situated in the southern slopes of the Taurus Mountains. The distance to Tarsus is 24 kilometres (15 mi) and the distance to Mersin is 45 kilometres (28 mi). Grapes are the most important agricultural product of the village.
