= Ayıtdere, Biga =

Village in Turkey

Ayıtdere
- Village
- Location in Turkey Ayıtdere (Marmara)
- Coordinates: 40°22′N 27°03′E
- Country: Turkey
- Province: Çanakkale
- District: Biga
- Population (2021): 171
- Time zone: UTC+3 (TRT)

Ayıtdere is a village in the Biga District of Çanakkale Province in Turkey. Its population is 171 (2021).
