= Çaltıkara, Çan =

Village in Turkey

Çaltıkara
- Village
- Location in Turkey Çaltıkara (Marmara)
- Coordinates: 39°59′N 26°49′E
- Country: Turkey
- Province: Çanakkale
- District: Çan
- Population (2021): 76
- Time zone: UTC+3 (TRT)

Çaltıkara is a village in the Çan District of Çanakkale Province in Turkey. Its population is 76 (2021).
