= Kumköy, Eceabat =

Village in Turkey

Kumköy
- Village
- Country: Turkey
- Province: Çanakkale
- District: Eceabat
- Population (2021): 305
- Time zone: UTC+3 (TRT)

Kumköy is a village in the Eceabat District of Çanakkale Province in Turkey. Its population is 305 (2021).
