= Yanıç, Biga =

Village in Turkey

Yanıç
- Village
- Location in Turkey Yanıç (Marmara)
- Coordinates: 40°10′43″N 27°05′22″E
- Country: Turkey
- Province: Çanakkale
- District: Biga
- Population (2021): 54
- Time zone: UTC+3 (TRT)

Yanıç is a village in the Biga District of Çanakkale Province in Turkey. Its population is 54 (2021).
