= Büyük ada =

Büyük ada ("big island" in Turkish) may refer to:

- Büyükada
- Büyük Ada - an island in the Karaburun town in Izmir
