= Bardakçılar, Çan =

Village in Turkey

Bardakçılar
- Village
- Location in Turkey Bardakçılar (Marmara)
- Coordinates: 39.9313°N 26.9786°E
- Country: Turkey
- Province: Çanakkale
- District: Çan
- Population (2021): 101
- Time zone: UTC+3 (TRT)

Bardakçılar is a village in the Çan District of Çanakkale Province in Turkey. Its population is 101 (2021).
