= Bilaller, Çan =

Village in Turkey

Bilaller
- Village
- Location in Turkey Bilaller (Marmara)
- Coordinates: 39°55′27″N 26°55′42″E
- Country: Turkey
- Province: Çanakkale
- District: Çan
- Population (2021): 200
- Time zone: UTC+3 (TRT)

Bilaller is a village in the Çan District of Çanakkale Province in Turkey. Its population is 200 (2021).
