= Kalafat, Biga =

Village in Turkey

Kalafat
- Village
- Location in Turkey Kalafat (Marmara)
- Coordinates: 40°13′33″N 27°16′50″E
- Country: Turkey
- Province: Çanakkale
- District: Biga
- Population (2021): 1,061
- Time zone: UTC+3 (TRT)

Kalafat is a village in the Biga District of Çanakkale Province in Turkey. Its population is 1,061 (2021).
