= Ramazanlar, Biga =

Village in Turkey

Ramazanlar
- Village
- Location in Turkey Ramazanlar (Marmara)
- Coordinates: 40.1791°N 26.9086°E
- Country: Turkey
- Province: Çanakkale
- District: Biga
- Population (2021): 172
- Time zone: UTC+3 (TRT)

Ramazanlar is a village in the Biga District of Çanakkale Province in Turkey. Its population is 172 (2021).
