= Aksaz, Biga =

Village in Turkey

Aksaz
- Village
- Location in Turkey Aksaz (Marmara)
- Coordinates: 40.4406°N 27.1709°E
- Country: Turkey
- Province: Çanakkale
- District: Biga
- Population (2021): 507
- Time zone: UTC+3 (TRT)

Aksaz is a village in the Biga District of Çanakkale Province in Turkey. Its population is 507 (2021).
