= Etili, Çan =

Village in Turkey

Etili
- Village
- Location in Turkey Etili (Marmara)
- Coordinates: 39°59′N 26°54′E
- Country: Turkey
- Province: Çanakkale
- District: Çan
- Population (2021): 1,296
- Time zone: UTC+3 (TRT)

Etili is a village in the Çan District of Çanakkale Province in Turkey. Its population is 1,296 (2021).
