= Aşağıdemirci, Biga =

Village in Turkey

Aşağıdemirci
- Village
- Location in Turkey Aşağıdemirci (Marmara)
- Coordinates: 40.2442°N 27.3712°E
- Country: Turkey
- Province: Çanakkale
- District: Biga
- Population (2021): 125
- Time zone: UTC+3 (TRT)

Aşağıdemirci is a village in the Biga District of Çanakkale Province in Turkey. Its population is 125 (2021).
