= Pekmezli, Biga =

Village in Turkey

Pekmezli
- Village
- Location in Turkey Pekmezli (Marmara)
- Coordinates: 40°15′10″N 27°7′40″E
- Country: Turkey
- Province: Çanakkale
- District: Biga
- Population (2021): 339
- Time zone: UTC+3 (TRT)

Pekmezli is a village in the Biga District of Çanakkale Province in Turkey. Its population is 339 (2021).
