= Çeltik, Biga =

Village in Turkey

Çeltik
- Village
- Location within Turkey Location within Marmara
- Country: Turkey
- Province: Çanakkale
- District: Biga
- Population (2021): 266
- Time zone: UTC+3 (TRT)

Çeltik is a village in the Biga District of Çanakkale Province in Turkey. Its population is 266 (2021).
