= Ağaköy, Biga =

Village in Turkey

Ağaköy
- Village
- Location in Turkey Ağaköy (Marmara)
- Coordinates: 40°16′5″N 27°8′56″E
- Country: Turkey
- Province: Çanakkale
- District: Biga
- Population (2021): 2,106
- Time zone: UTC+3 (TRT)

Ağaköy is a village in the Biga District of Çanakkale Province in Turkey. Its population is 2,106 (2021).
