= Karakadılar, Çan =

Village in Turkey

Karakadılar
- Village
- Location in Turkey Karakadılar (Marmara)
- Coordinates: 40°00′N 26°56′E
- Country: Turkey
- Province: Çanakkale
- District: Çan
- Population (2021): 90
- Time zone: UTC+3 (TRT)

Karakadılar is a village in the Çan District of Çanakkale Province in Turkey. Its population is 90 (2021).
