= Bakacak, Biga =

Village in Turkey

Bakacak
- Village
- Location in Turkey Bakacak (Marmara)
- Coordinates: 40.2053°N 27.0818°E
- Country: Turkey
- Province: Çanakkale
- District: Biga
- Population (2021): 220
- Time zone: UTC+3 (TRT)

Bakacak is a village in the Biga District of Çanakkale Province in Turkey. Its population is 220 (2021).
