= Çakırlı, Biga =

Village in Turkey

Çakırlı
- Village
- Location in Turkey Çakırlı (Marmara)
- Coordinates: 40.3750°N 27.1725°E
- Country: Turkey
- Province: Çanakkale
- District: Biga
- Population (2021): 174
- Time zone: UTC+3 (TRT)

Çakırlı is a village in the Biga District of Çanakkale Province in Turkey. Its population is 174 (2021).
