= Kadılar, Çan =

Village in Turkey

Kadılar
- Village
- Location in Turkey Kadılar (Marmara)
- Coordinates: 40.065°N 26.875°E
- Country: Turkey
- Province: Çanakkale
- District: Çan
- Population (2021): 34
- Time zone: UTC+3 (TRT)

Kadılar is a village in the Çan District of Çanakkale Province in Turkey. Its population is 34 (2021).
