= Kulfal, Çan =

Village in Turkey

Kulfal
- Village
- Location in Turkey Kulfal (Marmara)
- Coordinates: 40.0291°N 26.9888°E
- Country: Turkey
- Province: Çanakkale
- District: Çan
- Population (2021): 165
- Time zone: UTC+3 (TRT)

Kulfal is a Turkish village in the Çan District of Çanakkale Province. Its population is 165 (2021).
