= Bostandere, Çan =

Village in Turkey

Bostandere
- Village
- Location in Turkey Bostandere (Marmara)
- Coordinates: 40.0928°N 27.0491°E
- Country: Turkey
- Province: Çanakkale
- District: Çan
- Population (2021): 153
- Time zone: UTC+3 (TRT)

Bostandere is a village in the Çan District of Çanakkale Province in Turkey. Its population is 153 (2021).
