= Otlukdere, Biga =

Village in Turkey

Otlukdere
- Village
- Location in Turkey Otlukdere (Marmara)
- Coordinates: 40°20′N 27°04′E
- Country: Turkey
- Province: Çanakkale
- District: Biga
- Population (2021): 135
- Time zone: UTC+3 (TRT)

Otlukdere is a village in the Biga District of Çanakkale Province in Turkey. Its population is 135 (2021).
