= Yeniçeri, Çan =

Village in Turkey

Yeniçeri
- Village
- Location in Turkey Yeniçeri (Marmara)
- Coordinates: 40°02′N 27°06′E
- Country: Turkey
- Province: Çanakkale
- District: Çan
- Population (2021): 253
- Time zone: UTC+3 (TRT)

Yeniçeri is a village in the Çan District of Çanakkale Province in Turkey. Its population is 253 (2021).
