= Bozlar, Biga =

Village in Turkey

Bozlar
- Village
- Location within Turkey Location within Marmara
- Coordinates: 40.3107°N 27.3850°E
- Country: Turkey
- Province: Çanakkale
- District: Biga
- Population (2021): 464
- Time zone: UTC+3 (TRT)

Bozlar is a village in the Biga District of Çanakkale Province in Turkey. Its population is 464 (2021).
