= Hurma, Çan =

Village in Turkey

Hurma
- Village
- Country: Turkey
- Province: Çanakkale
- District: Çan
- Population (2021): 209
- Time zone: UTC+3 (TRT)

Hurma is a village in the Çan District of Çanakkale Province in Turkey. Its population is 209 (2021).
