= Kızılelma, Çan =

Village in Turkey

Kızılelma
- Village
- Country: Turkey
- Province: Çanakkale
- District: Çan
- Population (2021): 221
- Time zone: UTC+3 (TRT)

Kızılelma is a village in the Çan District of Çanakkale Province in Turkey. Its population is 221 (2021).
