= Çakılköy, Çan =

Village in Turkey

Çakılköy
- Village
- Location in Turkey Çakılköy (Marmara)
- Coordinates: 39.9763°N 27.0161°E
- Country: Turkey
- Province: Çanakkale
- District: Çan
- Population (2021): 167
- Time zone: UTC+3 (TRT)

Çakılköy is a village in the Çan District of Çanakkale Province in Turkey. Its population is 167 (2021).
