= Asmalı, Çan =

Village in Turkey

Asmalı
- Village
- Location in Turkey Asmalı (Marmara)
- Coordinates: 40.0495°N 27.2069°E
- Country: Turkey
- Province: Çanakkale
- District: Çan
- Population (2021): 83
- Time zone: UTC+3 (TRT)

Asmalı is a village in the Çan District of Çanakkale Province in Turkey. Its population is 83 (2021).
