= Küçüklü, Çan =

Village in Turkey

Küçüklü
- Village
- Location in Turkey Küçüklü (Marmara)
- Coordinates: 40.00°N 26.86°E
- Country: Turkey
- Province: Çanakkale
- District: Çan
- Population (2021): 192
- Time zone: UTC+3 (TRT)

Küçüklü is a village in the Çan District of Çanakkale Province, located in the Marmara region of Turkey. As of the 2021 census, the village has a population of 192 residents. Küçüklü is known for its peaceful rural atmosphere and its proximity to both natural and historical sites in the region.

== Geography ==
Küçüklü is located at 40.00°N 26.86°E in the Çan district, an area characterized by its fertile agricultural land, rolling hills, and a mild Mediterranean climate. The region is known for its natural beauty, with forested areas and arable lands supporting various agricultural activities.

== History ==
The historical details specific to Küçüklü are not well-documented, but the area is part of the broader historical context of the Çanakkale Province, which has been inhabited since antiquity. The province has seen the rise and fall of various civilizations, including the Greeks, Romans, and Ottomans. Küçüklü itself, like many Turkish villages, has likely developed around agriculture and rural life. Its residents are known for maintaining local traditions and customs, with a lifestyle shaped by the agricultural economy.

== Population ==
As of the 2021 census, the population of Küçüklü stands at 192 people, reflecting the village's small size and rural character. Population numbers can fluctuate, and these statistics provide insight into the village's demographic trends.

== Economy ==
The village's economy is primarily based on agriculture, with residents engaged in farming, livestock raising, and small-scale production of local goods. Küçüklü benefits from its fertile soil and favorable climate for growing crops like vegetables, fruits, and grains. Livestock farming is also significant, with cattle and sheep commonly raised in the area. In addition to agriculture, the proximity to larger urban areas, including Çan, has allowed some residents to find employment in commerce, services, and tourism.

== Culture and local life ==
Küçüklü is a rural village with a strong sense of community. The lifestyle is shaped by traditional Turkish customs, with village gatherings, festivals, and religious events playing an important role in social life. Local cuisine, which includes dishes such as *keşkek* (a traditional Turkish meat and wheat dish) and *zeytinyağlı* dishes (vegetables cooked in olive oil), reflects the agricultural nature of the area.

The village's mosque serves as the center of religious and social activity, with prayers, festivals, and community events often taking place there. Küçüklü's inhabitants maintain strong ties to their rural traditions, even as modern infrastructure and transportation improve their access to urban services.

== Infrastructure ==
Küçüklü is connected to the surrounding area by local roads. The nearest larger town is Çan, which provides access to additional services, including healthcare, education, and commerce. Infrastructure in Küçüklü is basic, with electricity, water, and internet access available. As a small village, it does not have as many amenities as larger urban areas but continues to see improvements through regional development projects.

== See also ==
- Çanakkale Province
