= Okçular, Çan =

Village in Turkey

Okçular
- Village
- Country: Turkey
- Province: Çanakkale
- District: Çan
- Population (2021): 68
- Time zone: UTC+3 (TRT)

Okçular is a village in the Çan District of Çanakkale Province in Turkey. Its population is 68 (2021).
