= Çemberlitaş Hamam =

Coordinates: 41°0′31.2″N 28°58′18.1″E

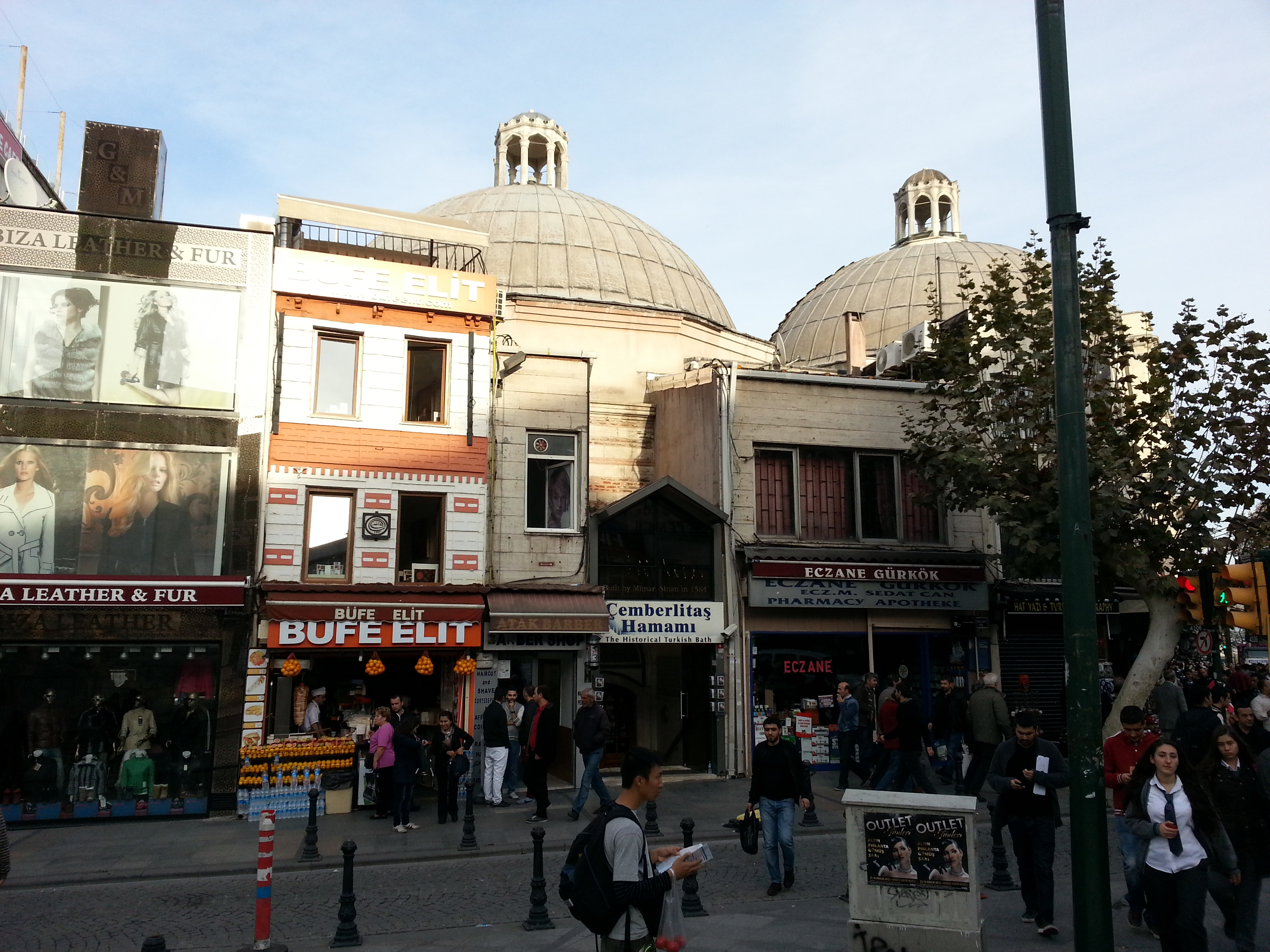
Entrance to Çemberlitaş Hamam

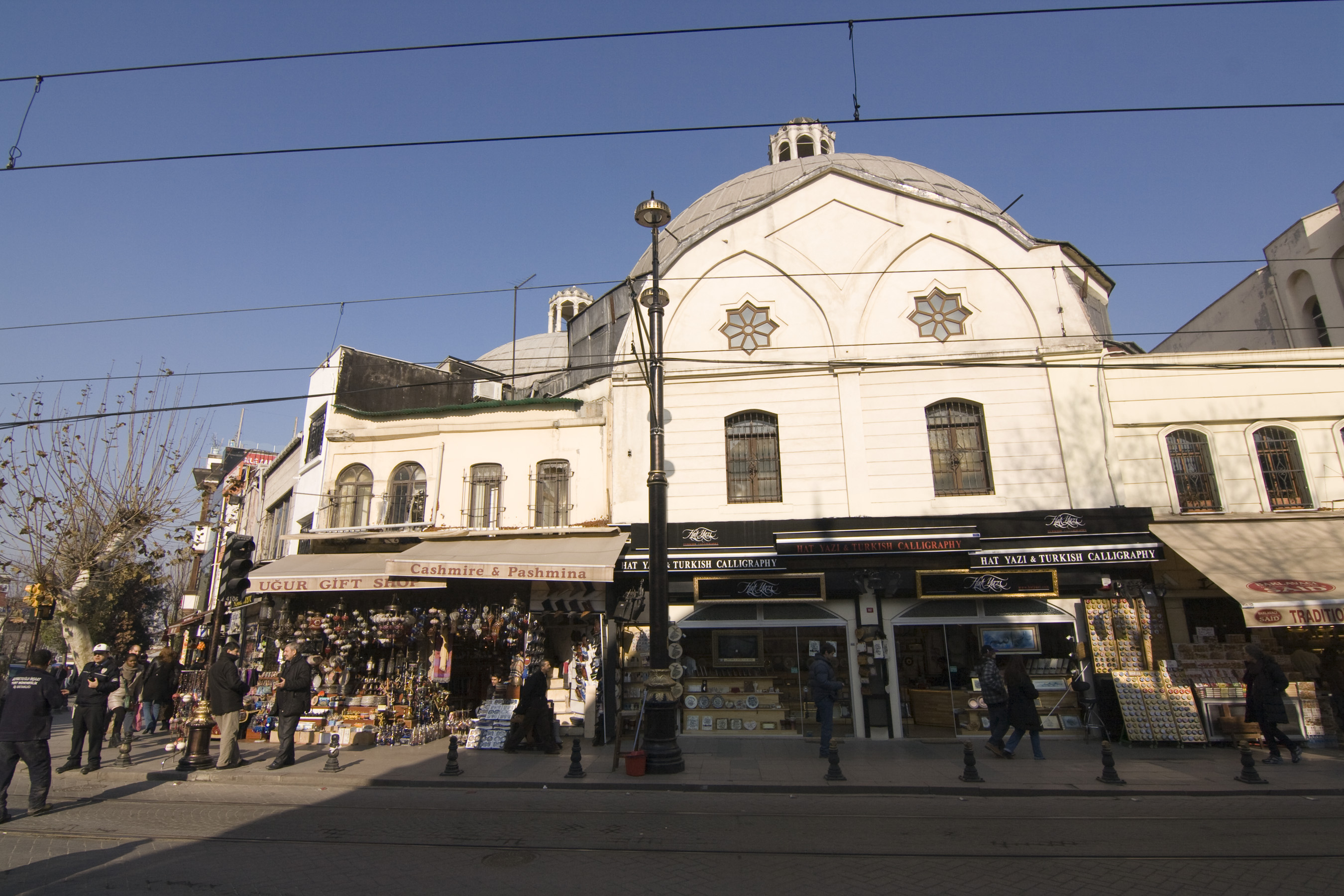
Çemberlitaş Hamam as seen from Divan Yolu

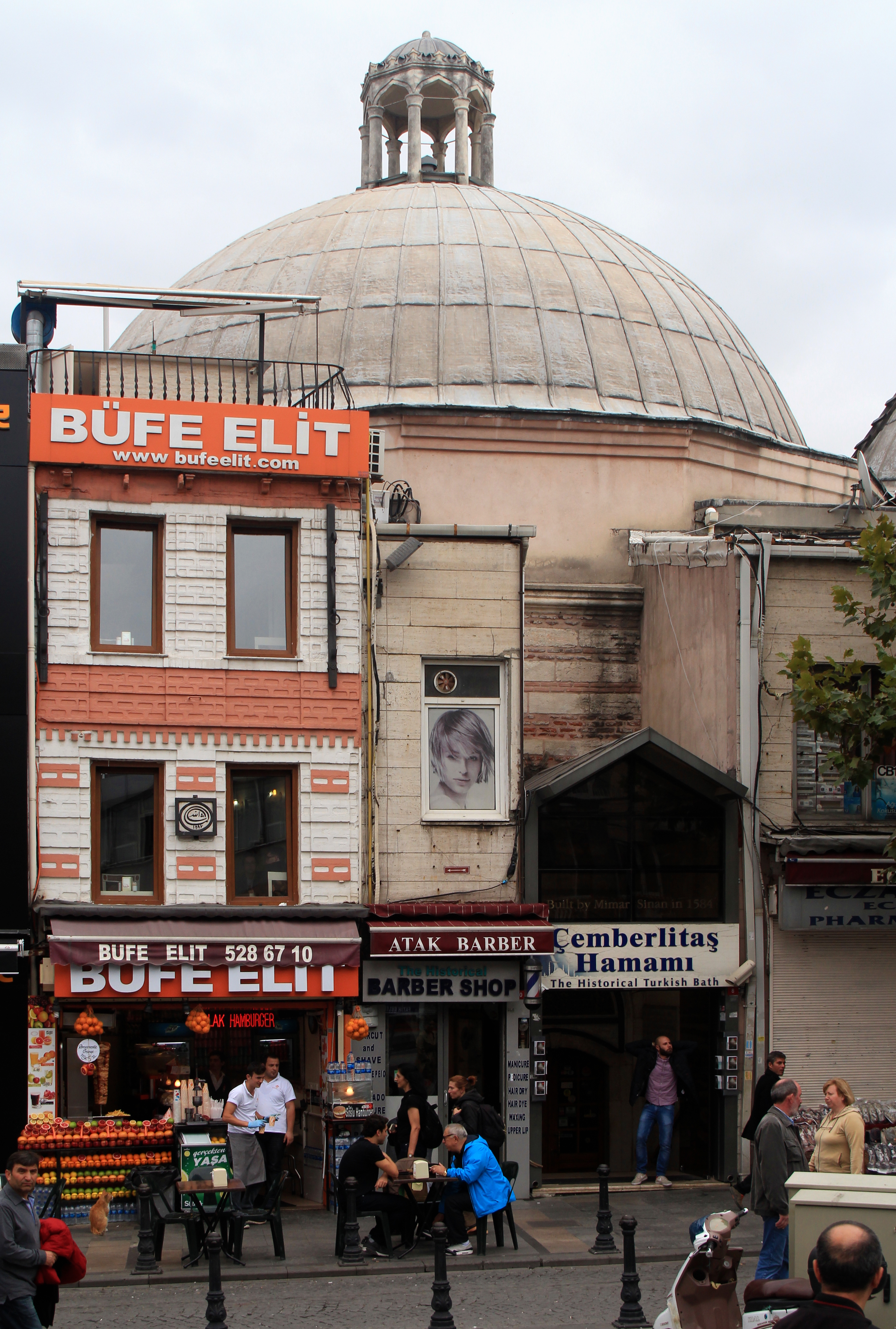
The entrance to Çemberlitaş Hamamı is squeezed in between shops.

The Çemberlitaş Hamam is a historical hammam (bathhouse) (Turkish: hamam) that was built beside Divan Yolu, a processional road dating back to the Byzantine Era that once led to Rome, in the Çemberlitaş neighbourhood of Istanbul, Turkey. Often attributed to Mimar Sinan, it was constructed in 1584. The hamam is close to the Çemberlitaş stop on the T1 tramline.

== History ==
=== Construction and history ===
The Çemberlitaş Hamam was commissioned by Nurbanu Sultan, the head of the Ottoman imperial harem after the death of her second husband Selim II. After his death, her first son ascended to the throne and she held the title 'Mother of the Sultan'. She was responsible for guarding the royal family and was able to exercise administrative control over the imperial harem. In order to manage it she was given a stipend that increased according to the number of women in the harem. She used the money to develop several charitable endowments including the Çemberlitaş Hamam.

As a charitable endowment, the main purpose of the hamam was to serve Istanbulites. However, it also helped to communicate the power of the imperial family, and, through its financial success, it paid for the development of new mosque complexes such as the Atik Valide Mosque complex in Istanbul. The Çemberlitaş Hamam was a great financial success. When referred to in economic reports listing the profit rankings of the city, the Çemberlitaş was often listed above other places of business such as shops, fields, gardens, and houses which were taxed for revenue.

Mimar Sinan is often credited as the architect of the Çemberlitaş Hamam. However, in the five-volume autobiography which lists all his completed works, the Çemberlitaş is only cited once in the fifth volume written after his death. In contrast to the Atik Valide Mosque which he lists in all five volumes, the Çemberlitaş Hamam was likely built by the team of architects that worked under him and completed his smaller projects with little to no supervision.

=== Later history ===
During the Ottoman Empire, buildings like the Çemberlitaş Hamam were constructed using stone and brick. Nonetheless, the Çemberlitaş Hamam was affected by many fires during its lifetime, and the lack of an effective fire-fighting unit contributed to the damage done. In July 1660, a fire raged so intensely over two days that it left the hamam and the area around it so devastated that rent at the hamam had to be cut in half. Massive earthquakes in 1719, 1754, and 1766, along with a fire in 1782. resulted in extensive structural damage to the hamam. In February 1667–8, around 6% of the hamam's income was spent on water conduits and unspecified repairs.

In 1768 an imperial decree prohibited further construction of hamams as they were causing a strain on fuel and water supplies. The focus then became on the renovation and preservation of existing hamams. In 1770, work was carried out on the inscription on the marble room dividers in the men's hot room, evidenced by inconsistencies in the calligraphy. Prior to March 1786, renovations were made to the water conduits outside Istanbul that supplied the hamam. Further renovations to the roof and interior and waterways of the hamam were carried out in 1790. In 1805 the lead covering of the domes and the water conduits were restored.

The practice of double renting, or icareteyn, became popular in the 18th century and allowed people to invest capital in the hamam as a result of the fall in its revenue. By allowing renters to become co-owners, they were encouraged to invest money in renovations and restorations even after a fire or earthquake. This continued until 1829 when the hamam no longer needed outside financial help.

During the Tanzimat Period (1839–1876), relatively little attention was paid to the bathhouses as priorities changed. Mustafa Resit Pasa, an urban planner who had travelled to Europe on diplomatic missions, admired European city planning and strove to recreate it in Istanbul. In 1868, he renovated the section of Divan Yolu near the Çemberlitaş Hamam after a fire in 1865.

Later sewers were installed, streets were widened and reoriented, which required the demolition of part of the Çemberlitaş Hamam and its dome, forcing the closure of the women's section. The street level surrounding the hamam rose so much that steps had to be built to allow entry to the men's söğüklük and broken off diagonally so that women could access the entrance to the women's iliklik.

In May 1902, around 30,000 books that did not pass the censorship approval of the Hamidian regime were burned in the bathhouse, including both foreign authors such as Montesquieu or Rousseau as well as Turkish writers such as Namik Kemal or Ziya Pasha.

=== Tourism and modern-day uses ===
After people started living in apartments with private bathrooms the use of hamams became more and more obsolete, so the Çemberlitaş Hamam was visited less from necessity and more by those in search of a historical experience. Tourism became the primary source of revenue for the Çemberlitaş Hamam and foreign visitors now make up almost all its visitors. Until December 2003, the women's söğüklük was used as a restaurant serving traditional Anatolian food.

== Architecture ==
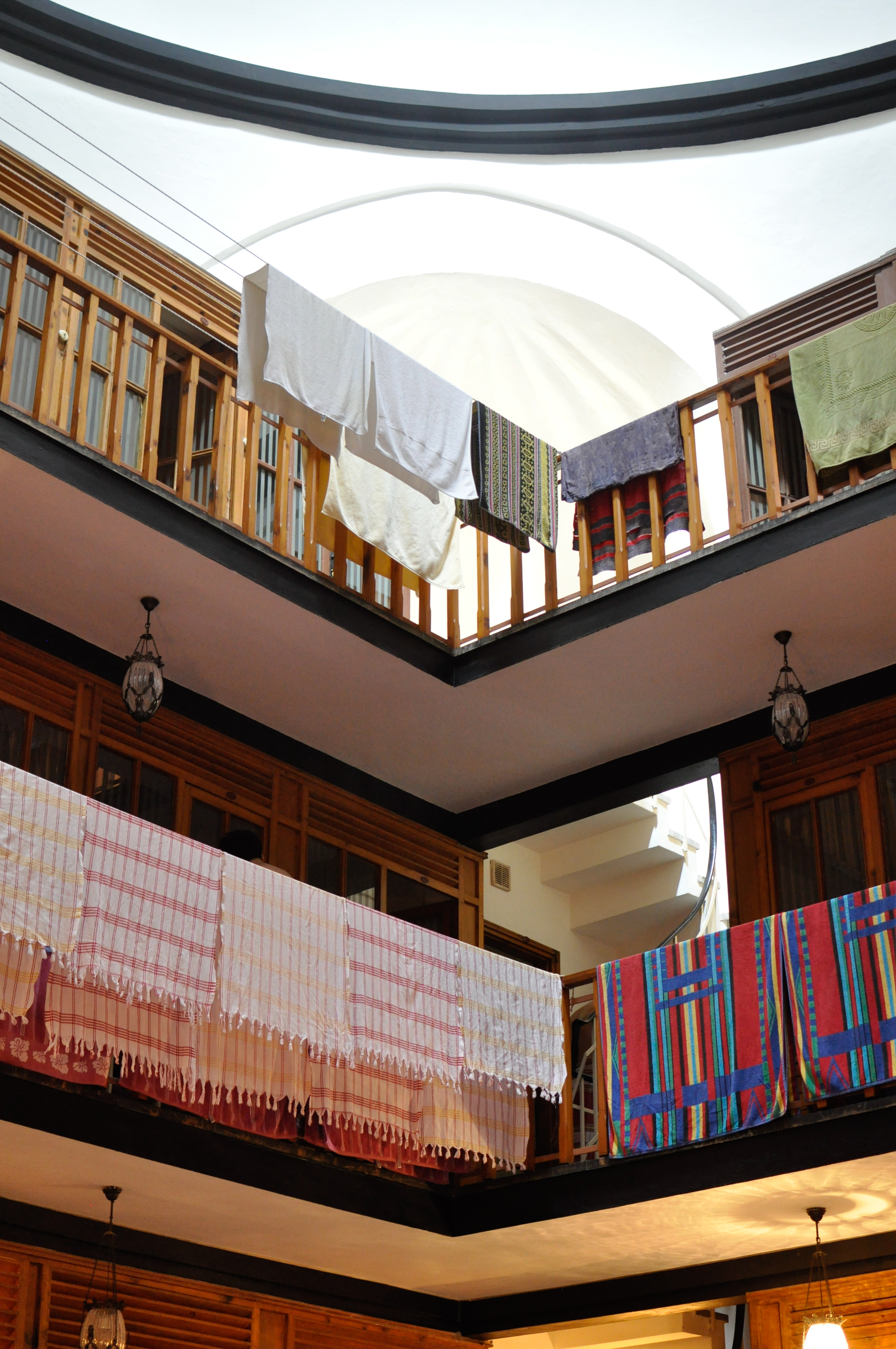
Çemberlitaş Hamam: the men's söğüklük

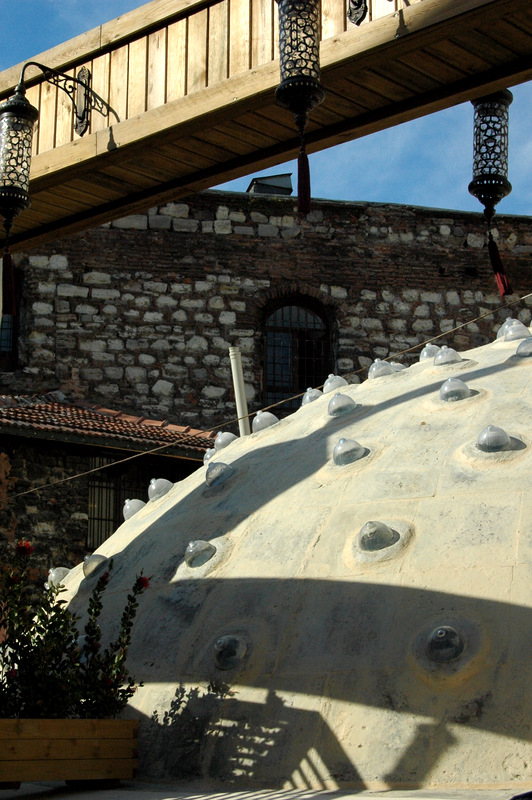
Exterior view of one of the domes

The hamam has two separate sections for men and women. The entrance to the men's section was decorated with a gold thuluth inscription on a green background written by the poet Sa'i-I Da'i that praises Nurbanu Sultan and the hamam. In contrast, the women's entrance was in more discreet area with no decoration so as to preserve the women's modesty.

The first room beyond the entrance is a dressing room, or sogukluk, where people undressed for the bath. The chambers were built of wood and space and offered a lounge for socialising and a place for refreshments after the bath was finished. The dressing room led into the iliklik, or warm room, a narrow hallway which prepared customers for the hot room, or sıcaklık, where they actually bathed. The sıcaklık is a square room although the placement of its twelve columns and the bathing chambers and niches in recesses around the perimeter, it appears to be dodecagonal. In the centre is a heated marble slab, or göbektaşı, where bathers would lie to work up a sweat.

At the back of the bathhouse is the furnace, which provides central heating for the entire building. As in ancient Roman heating systems, there is a hollow between the bottom of the building and the foundation underneath where smoke and hot gases circulate and rise up through flues between the walls to heat the rooms, with someone fuelling the fire.

== Employees ==
The hamam is located in a central area of Istanbul surrounded by mosques and near the Grand Bazaar so it served a large number of Istanbulites, particularly men. Its popularity meant that it offered many different jobs. In the women's section, there was a hamam anasi or 'mother of the hamam' Other people oversaw the running of the hamam with a team of supervisors and fee collectors working under them. There were cooks to make coffee and refreshments, a furnace stoker, laundrymen, bathhouse attendants, servants, and tellaks (people who bathed the customers).

Tellaks were often migrants or people who didn't have homes in Istanbul, and instead lived permanently in the hamam and sent a portion of their salary, which was made up of tips, to their family. Until the late 18th century, the majority of them were Albanian and the job was generational, with men following in the footsteps of their fathers to work there. Tellaks were chosen according to their physical strength, appearance and personality before being trained in the art of caring for their future customers by learning to wash their hair, clean their bodies, and massage them with the scrubbing glove.

== Influence ==
The 18th-century Hammam-e-Qadimi in the Indian city of Bhopal is said to have been inspired by the Çemberlitaş Hamam.
