= Battle of Simnitza =

1877 battle of the Russo-Turkish War (1877–1878)

- Part of the Russo-Turkish War (1877–1878)
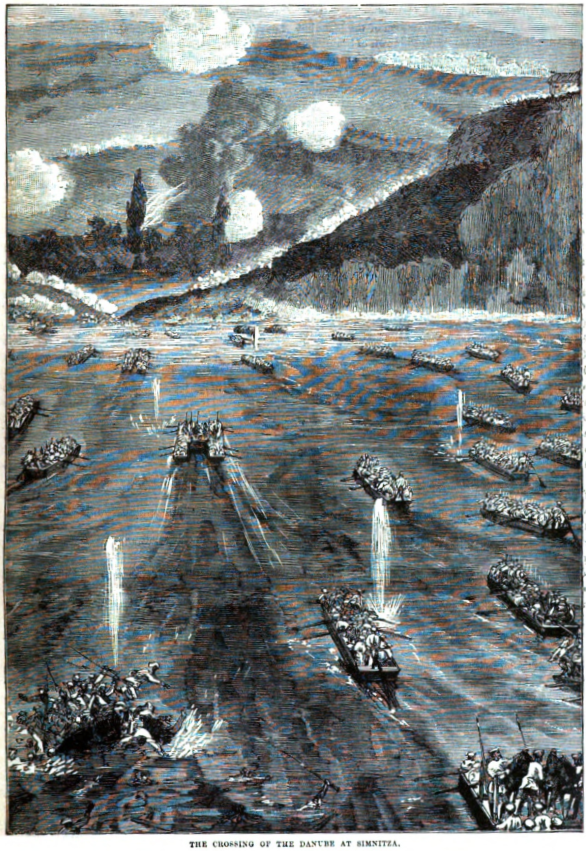
- The crossing of the Danube at Simnitza (Cassell's Illustrated History of the Russo-Turkish War, 1885)
Date	26–27 June 1877
Location	Svishtov
Result	Russian victory

Belligerents
Russian Empire	Ottoman Empire

Commanders and leaders
(Russian Empire) GD. Michael Nikolaevich	(Ottoman Empire) Kurt İsmail Pasha

Strength
75,000–91,000	13,000–15,000

Casualties and losses
Unknown, but heavy	Unknown, but light

The Battle of Simnitza took place between the Russians and the Turks fought on 26 June 1877 at Svishtov (Sistova), on the right bank of the Danube in present-day Veliko Tarnovo Province, Bulgaria. The Russians won the battle and occupied Sistova on 27 June. The Russians were led by Field Marshal Grand Duke Nicholas.

Simnitza, which is located on the northern bank of the Danube, across the river from Svishtov, is today more usually spelled according to Romanian usage as Zimnicea.

== See also ==
- Battles of the Russo-Turkish War (1877–1878)
