= Mustafa Zihni Pasha =

Ottoman politician (1838–1911)

Mustafa Zihni Pasha Pasha
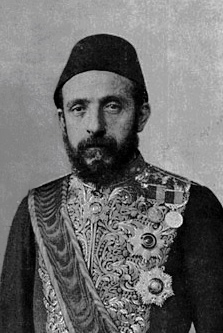
- Mustafa Zihni Pasha

Personal details
- Born: 1838 Sulaimaniyah, Ottoman Empire
- Died: 1911 (aged 72–73) Constantinople, Ottoman Empire
- Party: Society for the Rise of Kurdistan

Mustafa Zihni Pasha (1838–1911) was an Ottoman Kurd who held a number of influential Ottoman administrative posts. He was also a notable member of the Society for the Rise of Kurdistan.

He was described by Barré de Lancy and Charles Woods as an honest, fair and impartial man, Mustafa Zihni was also described as belonging to the highest Ottoman class.

He had an estate in Constantinople where he lived with his three sons, Ahmet Naim Bey, Ismail Hakki Bey and Huseyin Shukru Bey.

== Posts ==
- Minister of Commerce and Public Works
- Vali (governor) of the provinces of Hejaz, Ioannina, Adana and Aleppo
- Member of the Senate of the Ottoman Empire
- Chief of naval operations
- Head inspector of the army
- Sultan's special representative to Crete
- Chief secretary (Mektupcu) of the Baghdad Province
- Sub-governor (Mutasarrıf) of Burdur, a sanjak within the province of Konya

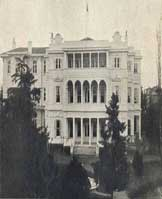
Mustafa Zihni Pasha's house in Constantinople
