= İsmail Hakkı =

İsmail Hakkı may refer to:

== People ==
- İsmail Hakkı (army officer) (1883–1923), Ottoman and Turkish army officer
- İsmail Hakkı (musician) (1865–1927), Ottoman composer and musician
- İsmail Hakkı Alaç (1911–1989), Turkish footballer
- İsmail Hakkı Baltacıoğlu (1886–1978), Turkish academic and politician
- İsmail Hakkı Duru (1946–2025), Turkish theoretical physicist and mathematician
- İsmail Hakkı Karadayı (1932–2020), Turkish general
- İsmail Hakkı Okday (1881–1977), Ottoman military commander
- İsmail Hakkı Sunat (1966–2004), Turkish actor
- İsmail Hakkı Tonguç (1893–1960), Turkish teacher and educational minister
- İsmail Hakkı Uzunçarşılı (1888–1977), Turkish historian and politician
- Kurt İsmail Hakkı Pasha (1818–1897), Ottoman field marshal and governor
