= Governor of Çanakkale =

Governor of a Turkish Province

Governor of Çanakkale Çanakkale Valiliği
- Incumbent; Ömer Toraman since September 25, 2024
- Appointer: President of Turkey; On the recommendation of the Turkish government
- Term length: No set term length or limit
- Inaugural holder: İsmail Hakkı Bey; 1923
- Website: Office of the Governor

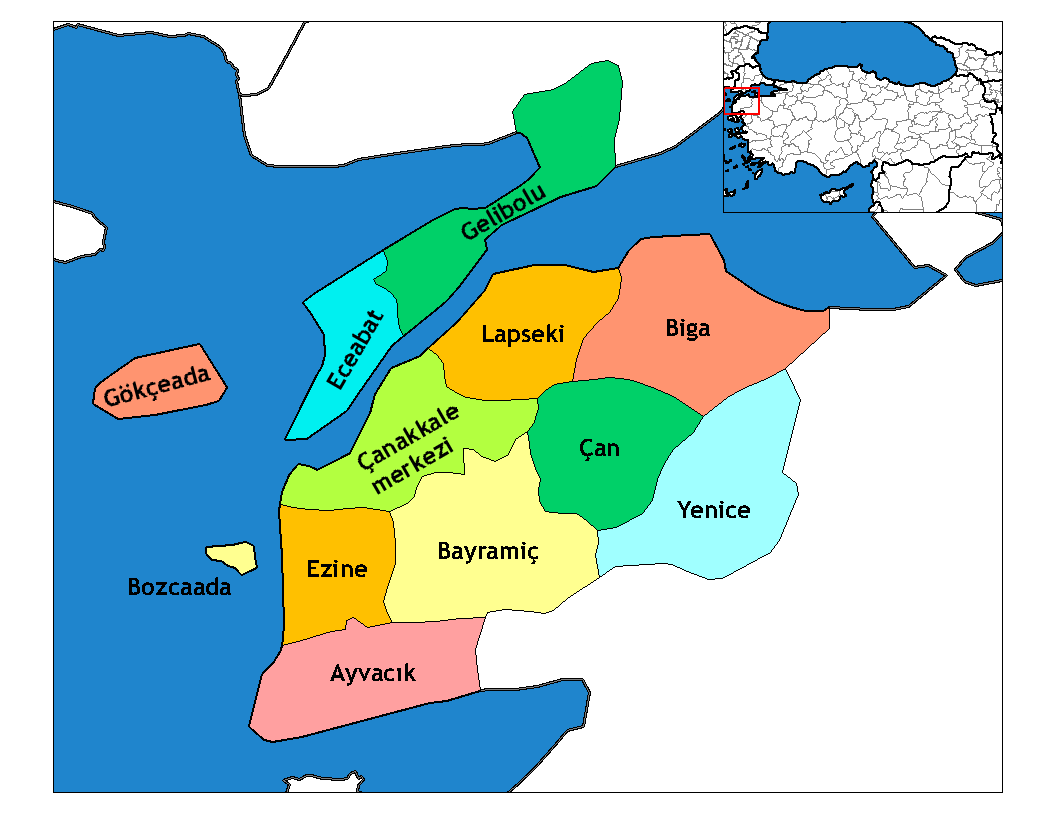
Map of the Province of Çanakkale, showing the provincial districts.

The Governor of Çanakkale (Turkish: Çanakkale Valiliği) is the civil service state official responsible for both national government and state affairs in the Province of Çanakkale. Similarly to the governors of the 80 other provinces of Turkey, the Governor of Çanakkale is appointed by the Government of Turkey and is responsible for the implementation of government legislation within Çanakkale. The Governor is also the most senior commander of both the Çanakkale provincial police force and the Çanakkale Gendarmerie.

== Appointment ==
The Governor of Çanakkale is appointed by the President of Turkey, who confirms the appointment after recommendation from the Turkish Government. The Ministry of the Interior first considers and puts forward possible candidates for approval by the cabinet. The Governor of Çanakkale is therefore not a directly elected position and instead functions as the most senior civil servant in the Province of Çanakkale.

=== Term limits ===
The Governor is not limited by any term limits and does not serve for a set length of time. Instead, the Governor serves at the pleasure of the Government, which can appoint or reposition the Governor whenever it sees fit. Such decisions are again made by the cabinet of Turkey. The Governor of Çanakkale, as a civil servant, may not have any close connections or prior experience in Çanakkale Province. It is not unusual for Governors to alternate between several different Provinces during their bureaucratic career.

== Functions ==
The Governor of Çanakkale has both bureaucratic functions and influence over local government. The main role of the Governor is to oversee the implementation of decisions by government ministries, constitutional requirements and legislation passed by Grand National Assembly within the provincial borders. The Governor also has the power to reassign, remove or appoint officials a certain number of public offices and has the right to alter the role of certain public institutions if they see fit. Governors are also the most senior public official within the Province, meaning that they preside over any public ceremonies or provincial celebrations being held due to a national holiday. As the commander of the provincial police and Gendarmerie forces, the Governor can also take decisions designed to limit civil disobedience and preserve public order. Although mayors of municipalities and councillors are elected during local elections, the Governor has the right to re-organise or to inspect the proceedings of local government despite being an unelected position.

== List of governors of Çanakkale ==
- Mehmet Rahmi Gökçe (1923–1924)
- İsmail Hakkı Bey (1924–1929)
- Süreyya Yurdakul (1929–1935)
- Nizamettin Ataker (1935–1937)
- Atıf Ulusoğlu (1937–1941)
- Fehmi Vural (1941–1945)
- Burhanettin Tekel (1945–1949)
- İhsan Sabri Çağlayangil (1949–1950)
- Cemal Tarlan (1950–1951)
- Fahrettin Akkutlu (1951–1953)
- Hadi Ömür (1953–1954)
- Ekrem Özsoy (1954–1955)
- Gafur Soylu (1955–1958)
- Cemalettin Tüfekçi (1958–1960)
- Ali Rıza Yaradanakul (1960–1961)
- Babür Ünsal (1961–1964)
- Ferit Nomer (1964–1966)
- Fikret Koçak (1966–1970)
- Celal Turgut Güvenç (1970–1975)
- Kamil Demircioğlu (1975–1978)
- Şahabettin Harput (1978–1981)
- İlhan Engin (1981–1984)
- Arif Atilla Osmançelebioğlu (1984–1986)
- Erol Çakır (1986–1989)
- Mustafa Eryılmaz (1989–1992)
- Ali Akan (1992–1996)
- Ahmet Cemil Serhadlı (1996–1999)
- Süleyman Kamçı (2000–2006)
- Orhan Kırlı (2006–2009)
- Abdülkadir Atalık (2009–2011)
- Güngör Azim Tuna (2011–2013)
- Ahmet Çınar (2013–2015)
- Hamza Erkal (2015–2016)
- Orhan Tavlı (2016–2020)
- İlhami Aktaş (2020–2024)
- Ömer Toraman (2024–)

== See also ==
- Governor (Turkey)
- Çanakkale Province
- Ministry of the Interior (Turkey)
