= Battles of the Russo-Turkish War (1877–78) =

Chronological listing of the Battles of the Russo-Turkish War (1877–1878).

== List of battles ==
Key: (R) – Russian victory; (O) – Ottoman victory; (I) – Inconclusive

=== 1877 ===
- May 5/17 - Assault on Ardahan; Russians capture Ottoman fortress Ardahan (R)
- June 16- Battle of Dramdag; Russians forced the Turks to retreat and entered the Passian Valley (R)
- June 26 – Battle of Simnitza; Russians begin crossing the Danube River (R)
- June 26 – Battle of Svistov; Russians reduce fortress and move on to Nikopol (R)
- July 12 - Battle of Elena I (O)
- July 16 – Battle of Nikopol; Russians move into Bulgaria (R)
- July 17 – Battle of Shipka Pass I; Russians capture Shipka Pass (R)
- July 20 – Siege of Plevna begins (R)
- July 20 - First battle of Plevna Ottomans repulse the Russian attack (O)
- July 31 - Second battle of Plevna Ottomans repulse the Russian attack (O)
- August 21 – Battle of Shipka Pass II; Russians repulse Ottoman attack on Shipka Pass (R)
- August 25 – Battle of Kızıl Tepe; Russian attempt at besieging Kars is driven off (O)
- September 3 – Battle of Lovcha; Russians reduce the fortress during the siege of Plevna (R)
- September 5 – Battle of Katselovo; Ottomans dislodge Russians from Katselovo (O)
- September 5/6 – Battle of Ablanovo; Ottomans dislodge Russians from Ablanovo (O)
- September 11 - Third battle of Plevna Ottomans repulse the Russian attack (O)
- September 13 – Battle of Shipka Pass III; Russians repulse second Ottoman attack on Shipka Pass (R)
- October 2/4 – Battle of Yahni; The Russians make some gains but are unable to hold them (O)
- October 12/15 – Battle of Aladzha; Ottoman army under Hadji Resit Pasha surrenders (R)
- October 24 – Battle of Gorni Dubnik; Russians capture Turkish redoubt guarding Plevna supply lines (R)
- November 4 – Battle of Deve Boyun; Russian general Heimann won a further battle (R)
- November 8/9 – Battle of Erzurum; Russians fail to capture Erzurum in an attack (O)
- November 17 – Battle of Kars; Russians seize Ottoman fortress in the Caucasus region (R)
- December 4 - Battle of Elena II (O)
- December 10 – Plevna capitulates to Russia (R)
- December 14 - Battle of Elena III (O)
- December 31 – Battle of Tashkessen; The Turks' hasty retreat from the battlefield opens up the possibility for the Russians to cross the Balkan Mountains (R)

=== 1878 ===
- January 4 – Battle of Sofia: General Gourko liberates Sofia from Turkish rule (R)
- January 5 – Battle of Shipka Pass IV; Gourko crushes Turks at Shipka Pass (R)
- January 17 – Battle of Philippopolis; Gourko routes Turkish forces and moves to within striking distance of Istanbul (R)

== See also ==
- History of Russo-Turkish wars
