= Hammam-e-Qadimi =

Hammām-ye Qadīmi

General information
- Location: Bhopal, Madhya Pradesh India
- Opening: 1700s

Other information
- Facilities: Public Bathing Area, Steam Room

Hammam-e-Qadimi is a functional 18th century hammam (bathhouse) in Bhopal, India.

Erected in the early 1700s during the rule of the Gonds, Hammam-e-Qadimi was gifted to Hajjam Hammu Khalida when Dost Mohammad Khan became Nawab of the city. The Indo-Turkish bathhouse is owned by a descendant of Hajjam Hammu Khalida, Mohammad Sajid, and has been kept in his family for five generations. The oil used for the massages offered in Hammam-e-Qadimi is a special recipe of Sajid's family.

Hammam-e-Qadimi was built in the style of the Çemberlitaş Hamamı of Istanbul and was constructed near a mosque so that individuals visiting the mosque may perform their ablutions before going there to pray. Sanchari Pal describes the interior of Hammam-e-Qadimi:

The public bathing area of Hammam-e-Qadami consists of many windowless chambers. The main steam room is a chamber in which thick, hand-hewn slabs of limestone are laid over a hollowed-out floor, with a small, circular glass aperture in the vaulted roof letting light into the chamber. The steam is generated by burning logs in the arched basement, which heats water in a large copper vessel. The steam is transferred through copper pipes embedded in the walls and is trapped inside the steam room using a series of doors and chambers. These chambers form stages of a gradual transition from the hot and humid 60 Celsius steam chamber to the relatively cool and dry rooms outside. From the rooftop, five openings called the naak and kaan (nose and ears) of the hammam can be seen. These openings maintain the ventilation within the building.

== See also ==
- Tourism in Madhya Pradesh
- Hammam (Red Fort)
