= Hammam (Red Fort) =

Coordinates: 28.656784°N 77.243541°E

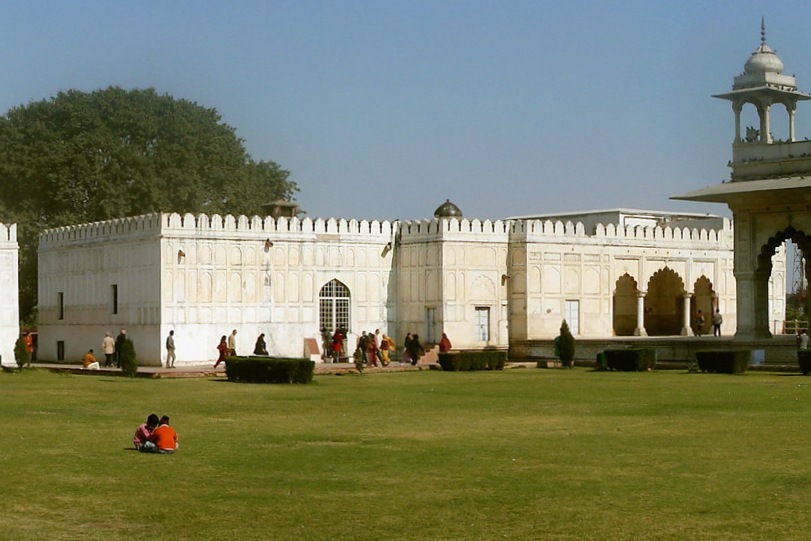
The hammam of the Red Fort

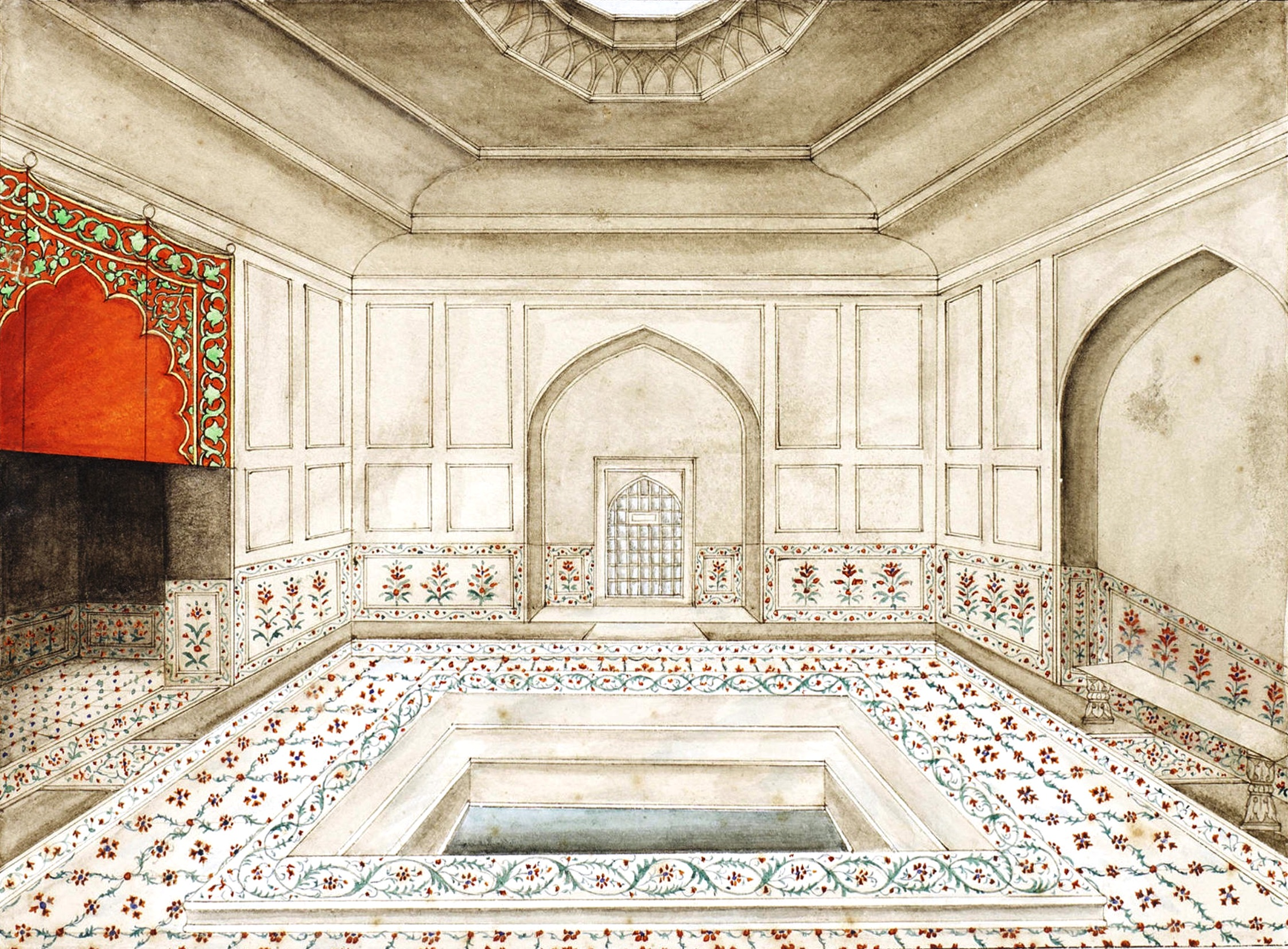
Drawing of one of the chambers of the hammam in the 19th century, by Ghulam Ali Khan

The Hammam-e-Lal Qila (Urdu: حمامِ لال قلعہ, Hindi: हम्माम-ए-लाल क़िला) is the Turkish bathhouse located in the Red Fort in Old Delhi which served as the bathing area of the Mughal Indian emperor. It is located in the north of the Diwan-i-Khas.

The marble hammam is a bath that forms a part of the palace building. It consists of three apartments separated by corridors and crowned with domes. The apartments are illuminated by a colored glass skylight.

The two rooms to either side of the present entrance are believed to have been used by the royal children for bathing. The eastern apartment, containing three fountain basins, was used primarily as a dressing room. In the center of each room stood a fountain, and one of the rooms contained a marble reservoir built into the wall. As legend goes, perfumed rose-water once ran from the taps. The western apartment was used for hot or vapor baths, and the heating arrangement was being fixed in its western wall.

The whole interior was richly decorated with colorful inlaid pietra dura floral designs made of white marble. The floors and dados of these apartments are finished with white marble as well.

== Architecture ==
The Hammam‑e‑Lal Qila, or imperial bath, in the Red Fort comprises three domed marble chambers linked by corridors and roofed with coloured glass skylights that provide both illumination and ventilation. The eastern chamber is fitted with three fountain basins, served as a dressing room, the two adjoining rooms housed central fountains and a marble reservoir. Legend says that they once dispensed perfumed rose‑water. The western chamber was reserved for hot and steam baths, its heating apparatus built into the wall. Hidden under dense vegetation until 2019, the rectangular hammam measures roughly 21.5 × 6.3 m, lies about 4.46 m below ground, and is reached by two Lakhori brick and sandstone staircases, one of which features fifteen arches once lit by oil lamps.

== See also ==
- Shahi Hammam, Lahore
- List of tourist attractions in Delhi
- Hammam-e-Qadimi
