= Çanakkale Province =

Province in northwestern Turkey

Çanakkale Province Çanakkale ili
- Province
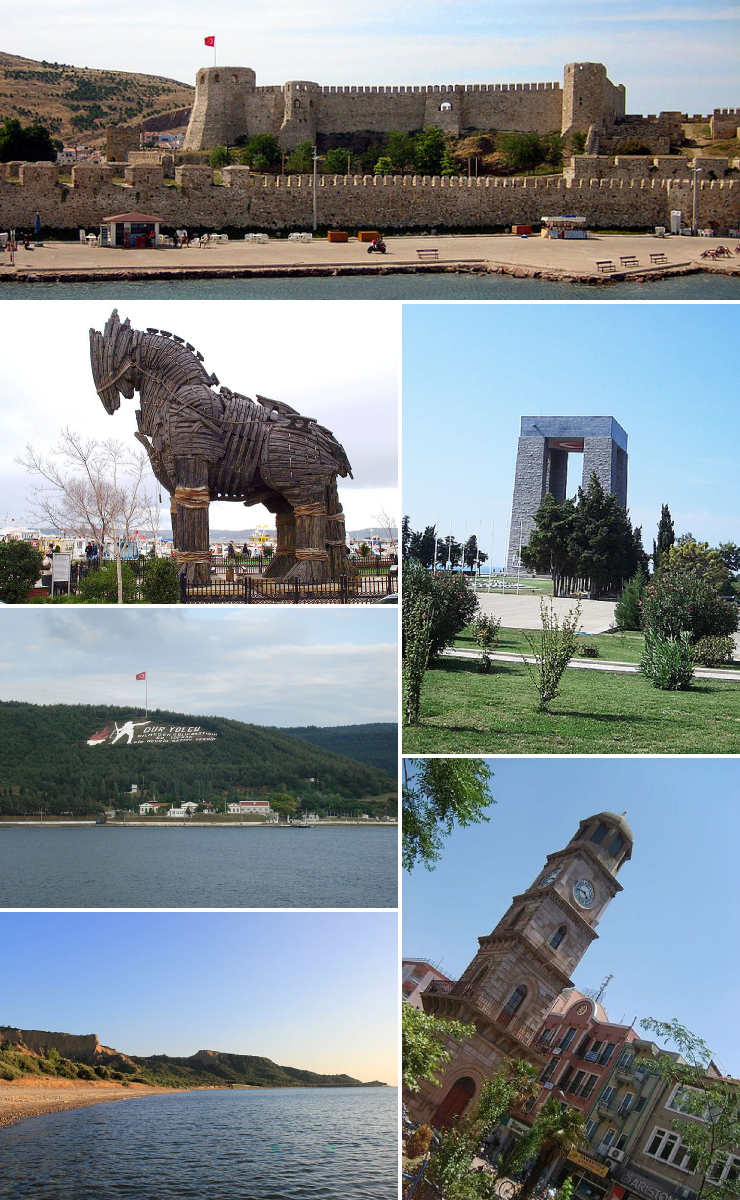

- Location of the province within Turkey
- Coordinates: 40°02′27″N 26°33′37″E
- Country: Turkey
- Seat: Çanakkale

Government
  - Governor: Ömer Toraman
- Area: 9,817 km^{2} (3,790 sq mi)
- Population (2022): 559,383
  - Density: 56.98/km^{2} (147.6/sq mi)
- Time zone: UTC+3 (TRT)
- Area code: 0286
- ISO code: TR-17
- Website: www.canakkale.gov.tr

Çanakkale Province (Turkish: Çanakkale ili) is a province of Turkey, located in the northwestern part of the country. It takes its name from the city of Çanakkale. Its area is 9,817 km^{2}, and its population is 559,383 (2022). Similar to Istanbul, Çanakkale province spans Europe (Thrace) and Asia (Anatolia). The European part is formed by the Gallipoli peninsula, while the Asian part is largely coterminous with the historic region of Troad in Anatolia. They are separated by the Dardanelles strait, connecting the Sea of Marmara and the Aegean Sea.

The archaeological site of Troy is found in the Çanakkale province, near the village of Tevfikiye.

Çanakkale District is the most populous district of the province. A bridge connecting the province across the straits was unveiled in March 2022.

== History ==
In the early Turkish Republic, Çanakkale Province came into existence with the abolition of the Ottoman-era sanjaks of Biga and Gelibolu. According to a population census in 1927, Çanakkale had 8,500 inhabitants, excluding neighbouring villages. It is recorded that Çanakkale, which was also called as "Hellespontos" and "Dardanelles" in ancient times, has accommodated many civilizations for about 3,000 years. Even the Archaic Troy (Troia) city, formerly governed by Lydians and destroyed by the devastating earthquake in 2500 BC, has ruins surviving to today. In 336 BC, the Persian Empire, which became the crucial power in Anatolia, was conquered by Alexander the Great. Also with the ruin of the Anatolian beylik of Karesi, most of the territory of Çanakkale was conquered in the Ottoman era, with the assistance of the castles in remuneration for helping to Byzantine Empire, locating Gelibolu. Afterwards, the Çanakkale strait was given to the Ottoman Empire.

The province was included in the Second Inspectorate General on the 19 February 1934 which span over the provinces of Edirne, Çanakkale, Kırklareli, Tekirdağ. It was ruled by an Inspector General who had wide-ranging authorities over civilian, military and educational matters. The office of the Inspectorate-General was abandoned in 1948 but the legal framework of the Inspectorate-Generals was only abolished in 1952, under the Government of the Democrat Party.

== Agriculture ==
The province of Çanakkale is a notable region for viticulture and winemaking in Turkey. The region between Saros Gulf and Gelibolu on the Gallipoli peninsula is cultivated with vineyards. Wine producer "Suvla" is located in Suvla.

== Environment ==
As of 2020 several of the country's coal fired power stations are here, some with smokestack filters which do not meet regulations.

== Districts ==
Districts of Çanakkale province

Çanakkale province is divided into 12 districts, including the capital district Çanakkale (or Merkez):

District	Continent	Population	Area km^{2}	Density /km^{2}
Ayvacık	Asia	34,549	872	39.6
Bayramiç	Asia	28,952	1,085	26.7
Biga	Asia	92,180	1,266	72.8
Bozcaada	Asia	3,120	37	83.3
Çan	Asia	47,954	876	54.7
Çanakkale	Asia	197,841	1,029	192.3
Eceabat	Europe	8,684	416	20.9
Ezine	Asia	31,848	768	41.5
Gelibolu	Europe	43,984	830	53.0
Gökçeada	Europe	10,348	283	36.6
Lapseki	Asia	29,336	867	33.8
Yenice	Asia	30,587	1,476	20.7
Europe (3 districts)		63,016	1,528	41.2
Asia (9 districts)		496,367	8,276	60.0
Total		559,383	9,804	57.1

== Gallery ==
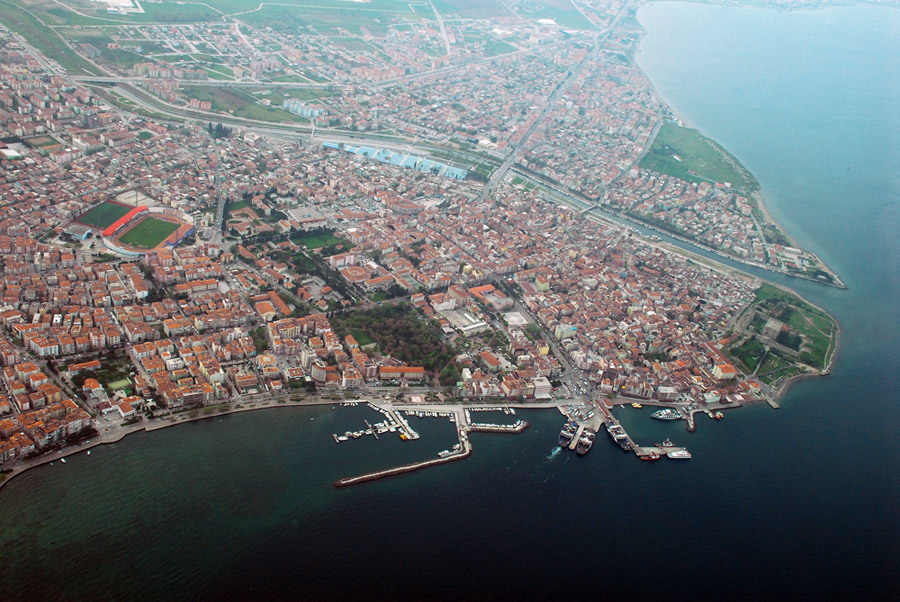
Çanakkale

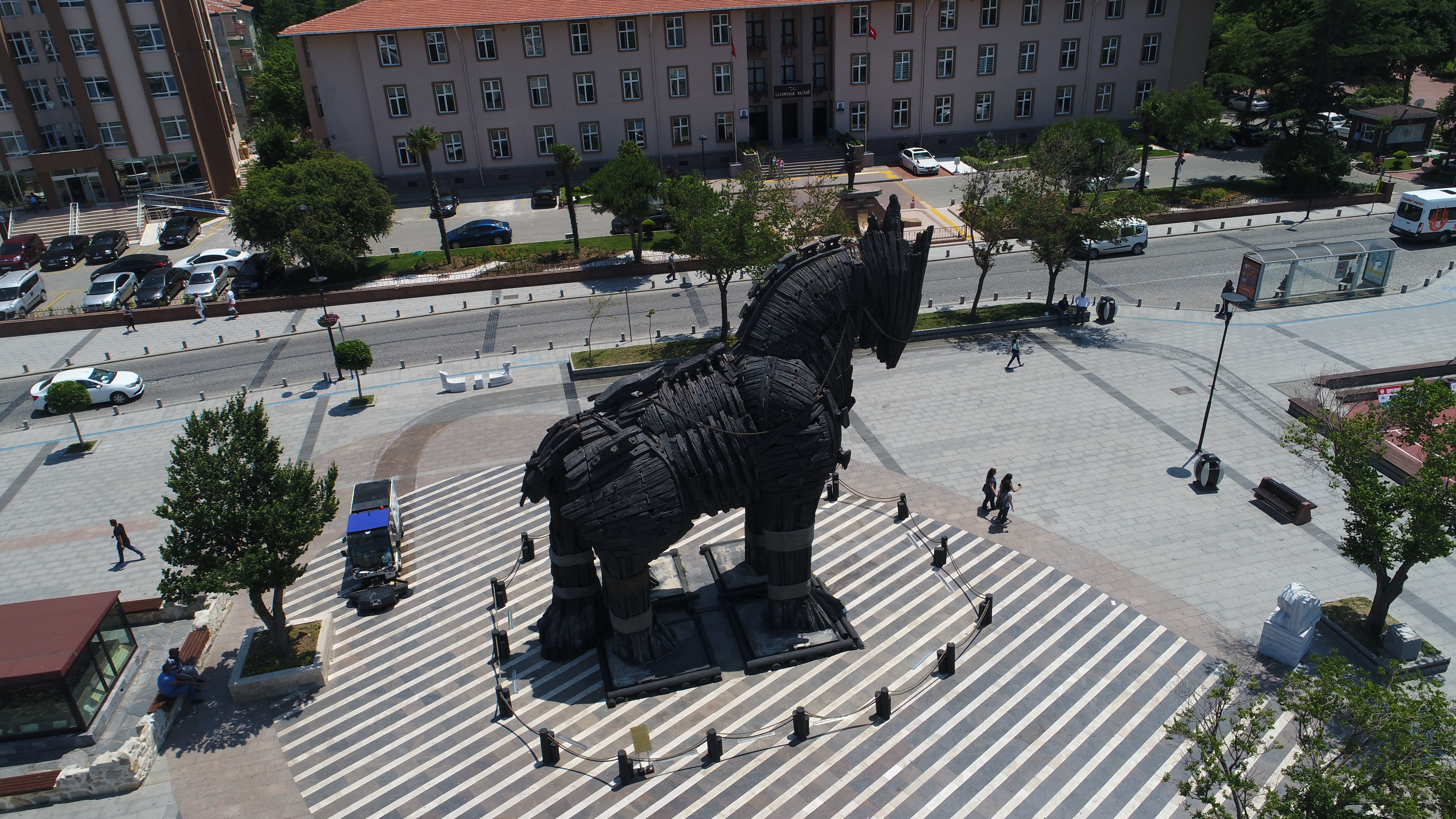
Çanakkale Trojan Horse

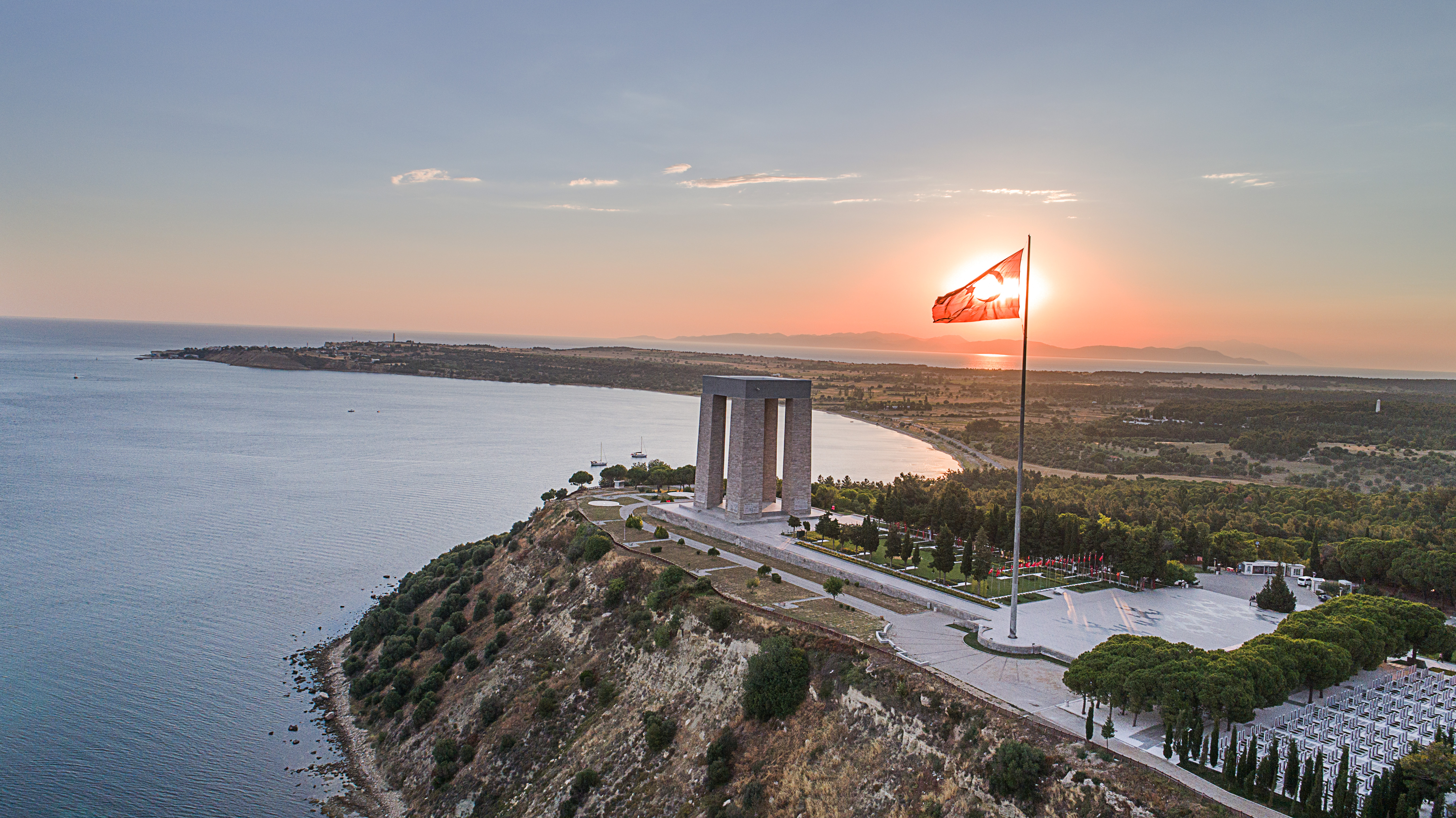
Çanakkale Martyrs' Monument

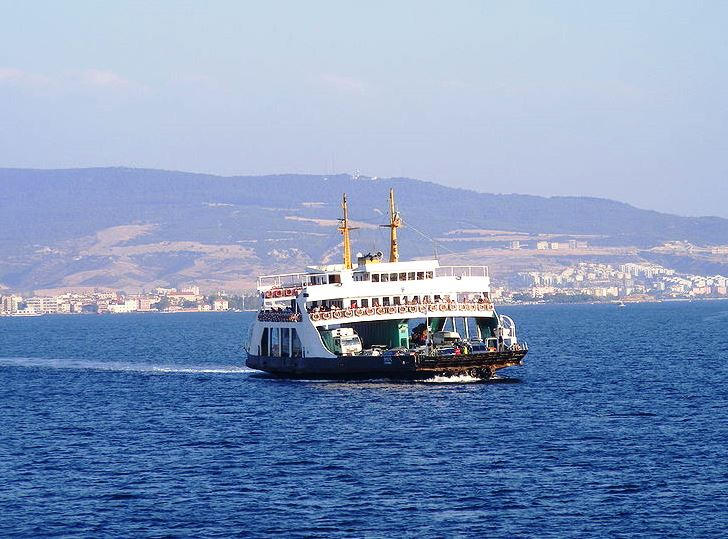
A ferry going from the town of Çanakkale to Gallipoli peninsula

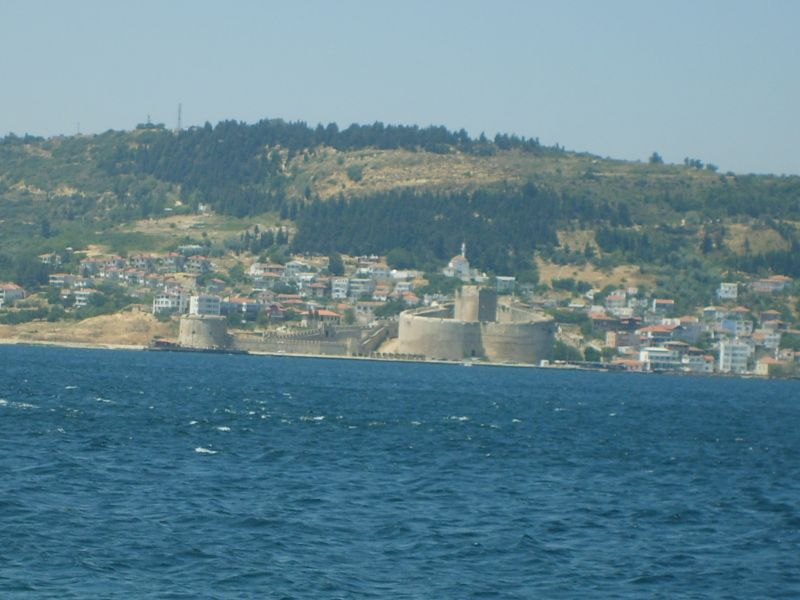
A view of Kilitbahir from Çanakkale, over the Dardanelles

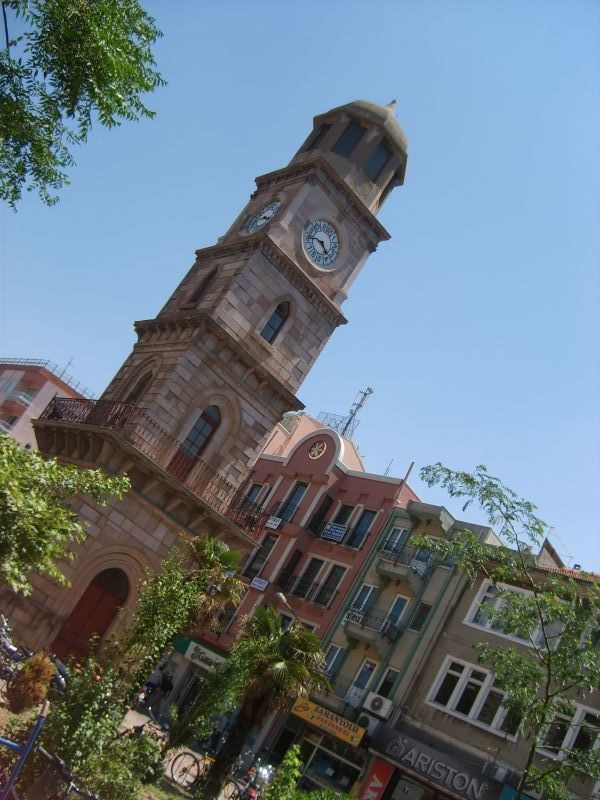
Historical clock tower in Çanakkale town center

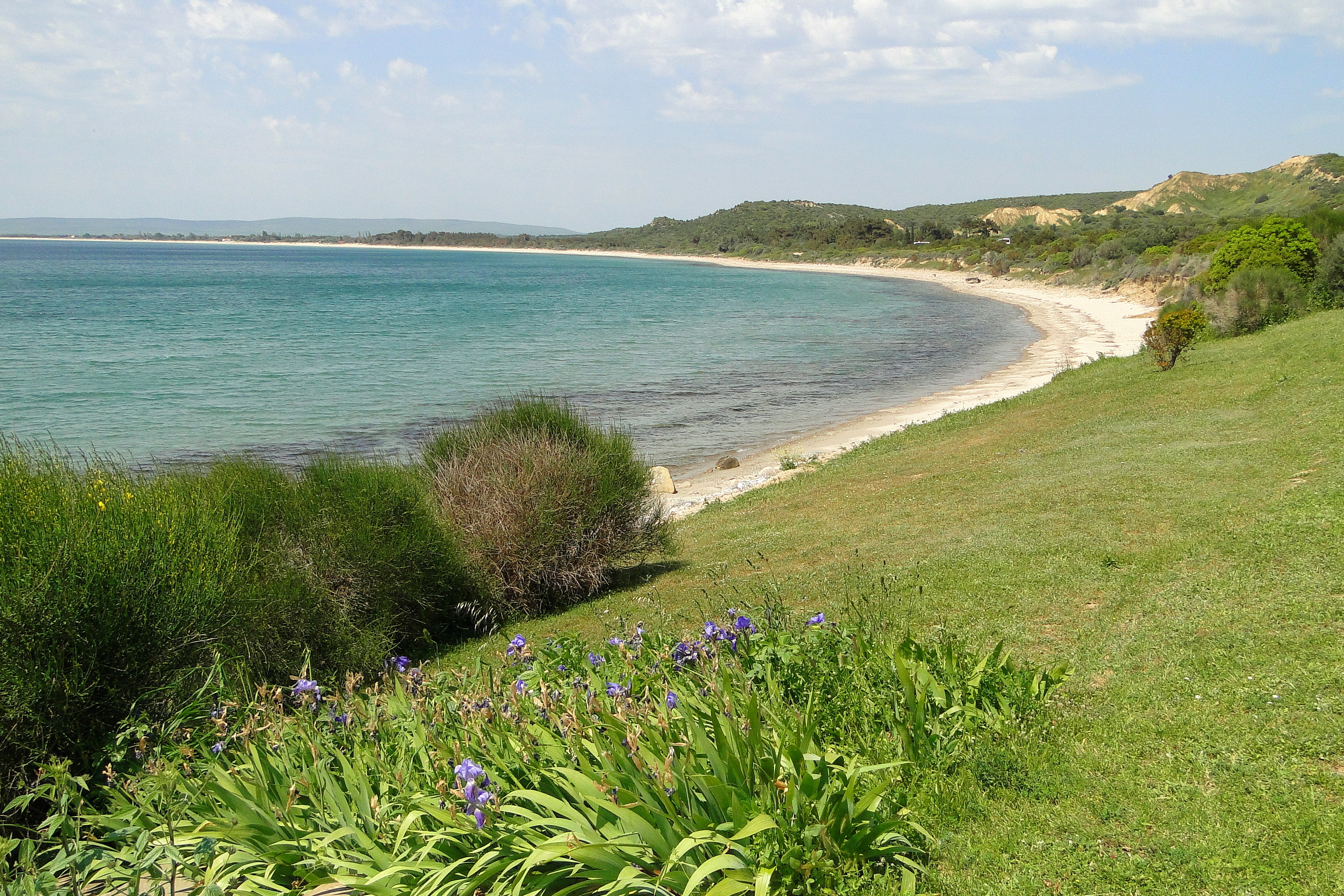
Anzac Cove of Gallipoli Peninsula

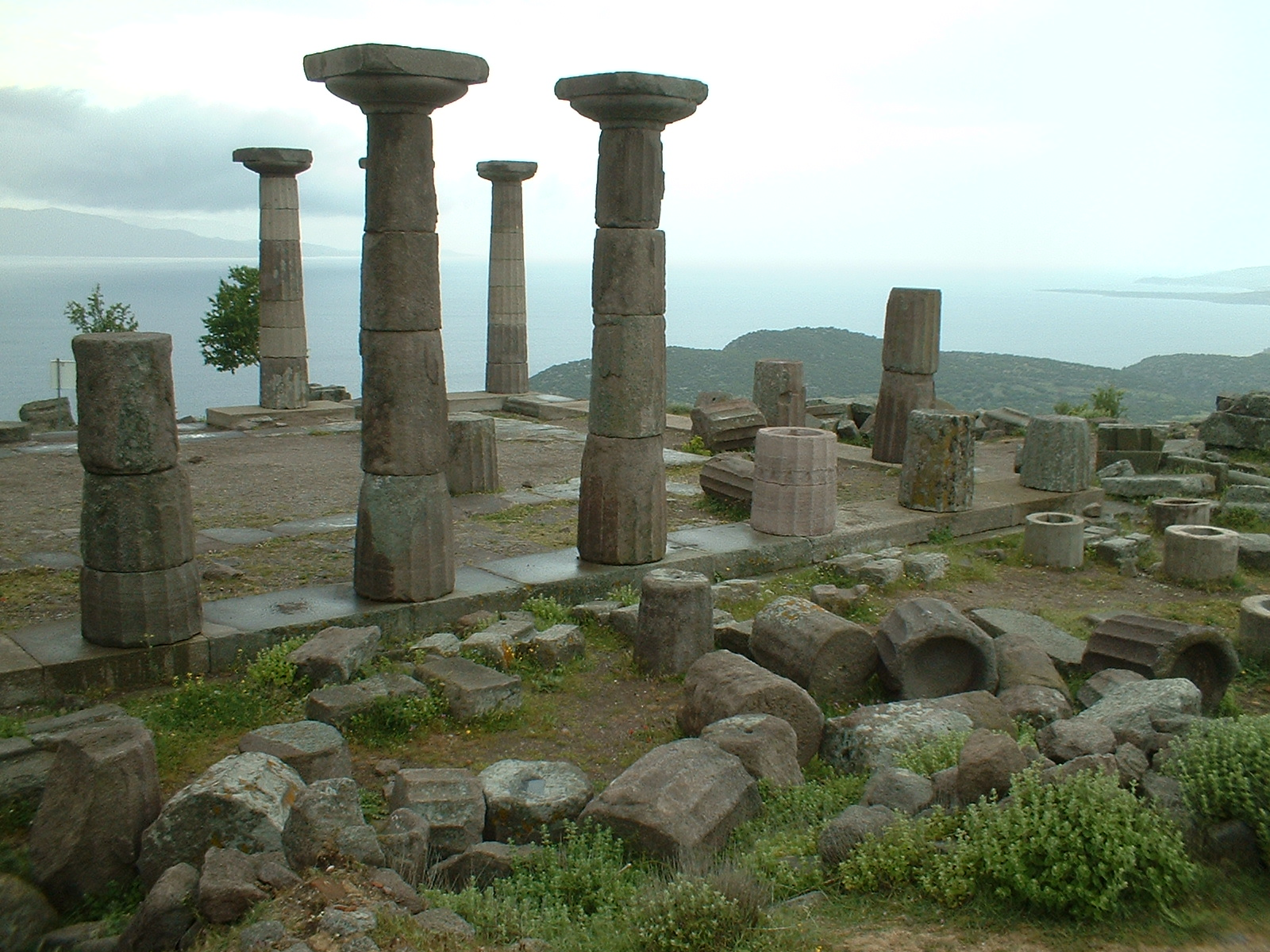
Ruins of the Temple of Athena, in Assos

== See also ==
- List of populated places in Çanakkale Province
