= İsmail Hakkı (musician) =

Turkish composer and musician during the Ottoman Empire

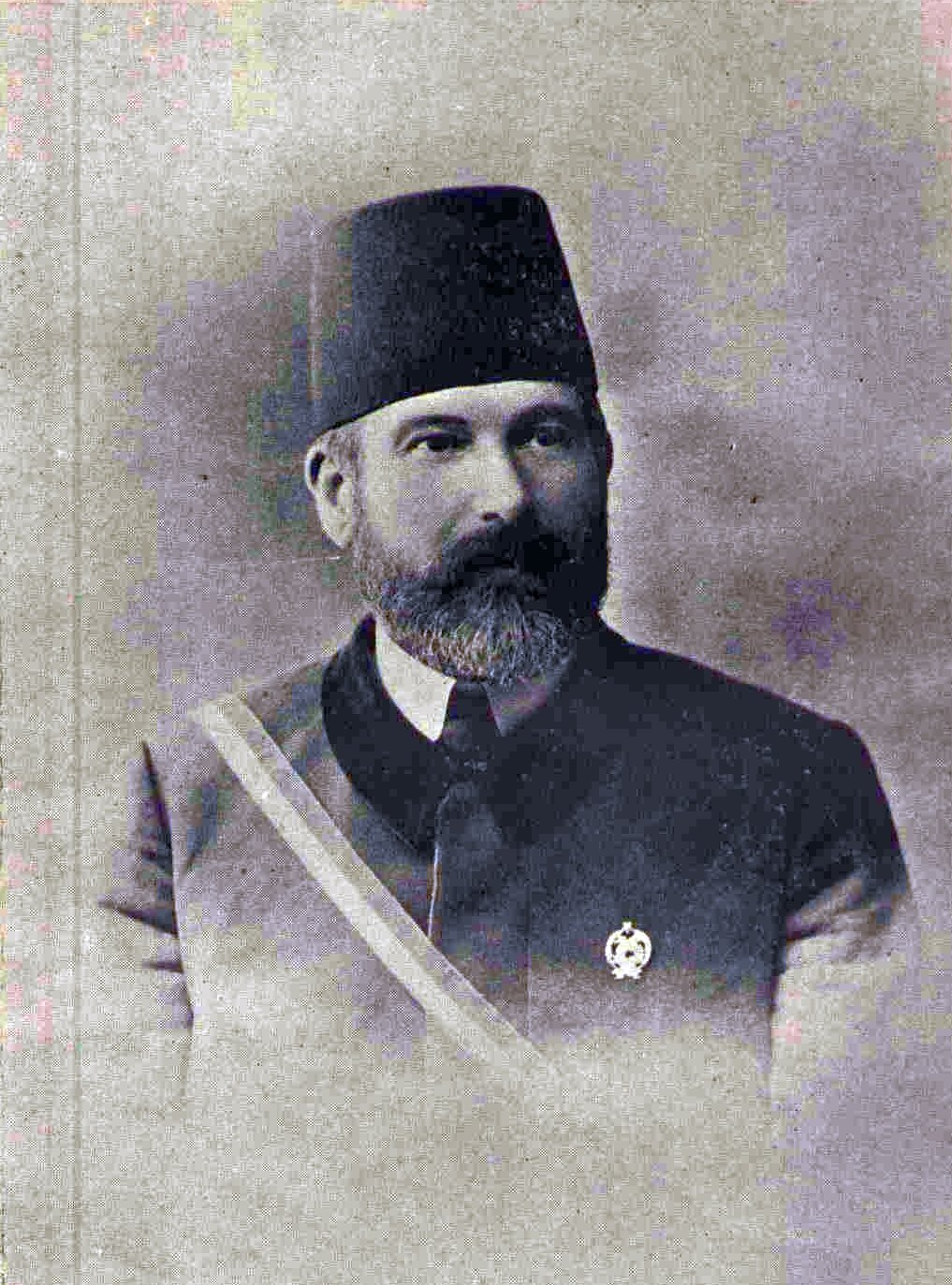
İsmail Hakkı Bey

İsmail Hakkı Bey (1865–1927) was a composer and musician from the Ottoman Empire during the Hamidian Era (1876–1908) under the rule of Abdulhamid II He is also known for composing many of today's popular mehter marches, such as Ceddin deden and Mehterhâne-i Hâkânî Marşı (often referred to as "Gâfil Ne Bilir") .
