= Battle of Helena (disambiguation) =

The Battle of Helena was an American Civil War battle in 1863.

Battle of Helena may also refer to several conflicts:

- Battle of Helena (431)
- Battle of Lena (1208)
- Battle of Helena (1863)
- Battle of Elena (1877)
