= İsmail Hakkı Alaç =

Turkish footballer

Personal information
- Date of birth: 25 May 1911
- Date of death: 1989 (aged 77–78)

International career
Years	Team	Apps	(Gls)
- Turkey

İsmail Hakkı Alaç (25 May 1911 – 1989) was a Turkish footballer. He competed in the men's tournament at the 1936 Summer Olympics.
