= Atik Valide Mosque =

Mosque in Istanbul, Turkey

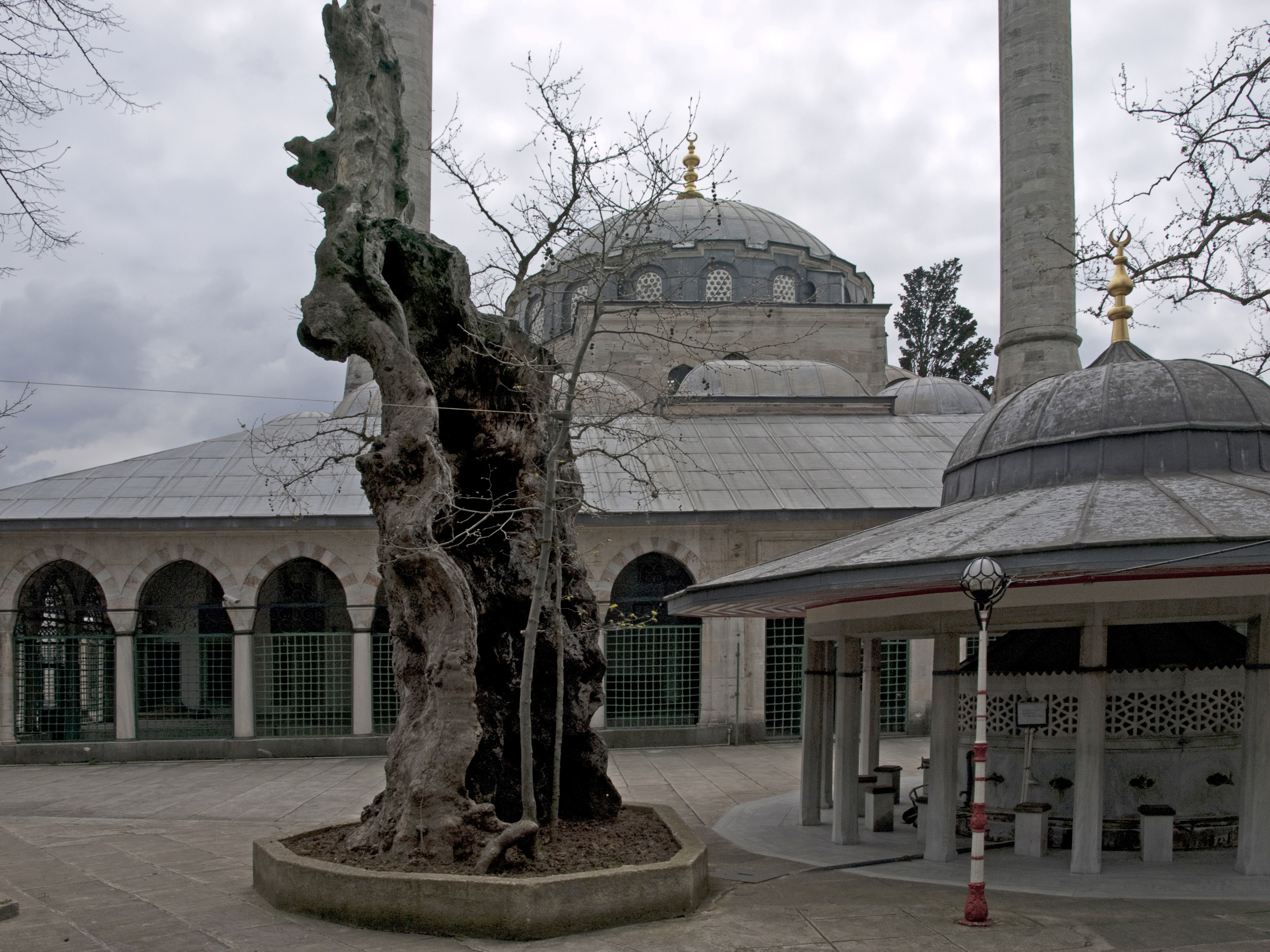

- Location within Istanbul

Religion
- Affiliation: Islam

Location
- Location: Istanbul, Turkey
- Coordinates: 41.018797°N 29.023862°E

Architecture
- Architect: Mimar Sinan
- Style: Ottoman
- Groundbreaking: 1571
- Completed: 1586

Specifications
- Dome dia. (outer): 12.7 m (42 ft)
- Minaret: 2
- Materials: granite, marble, tile

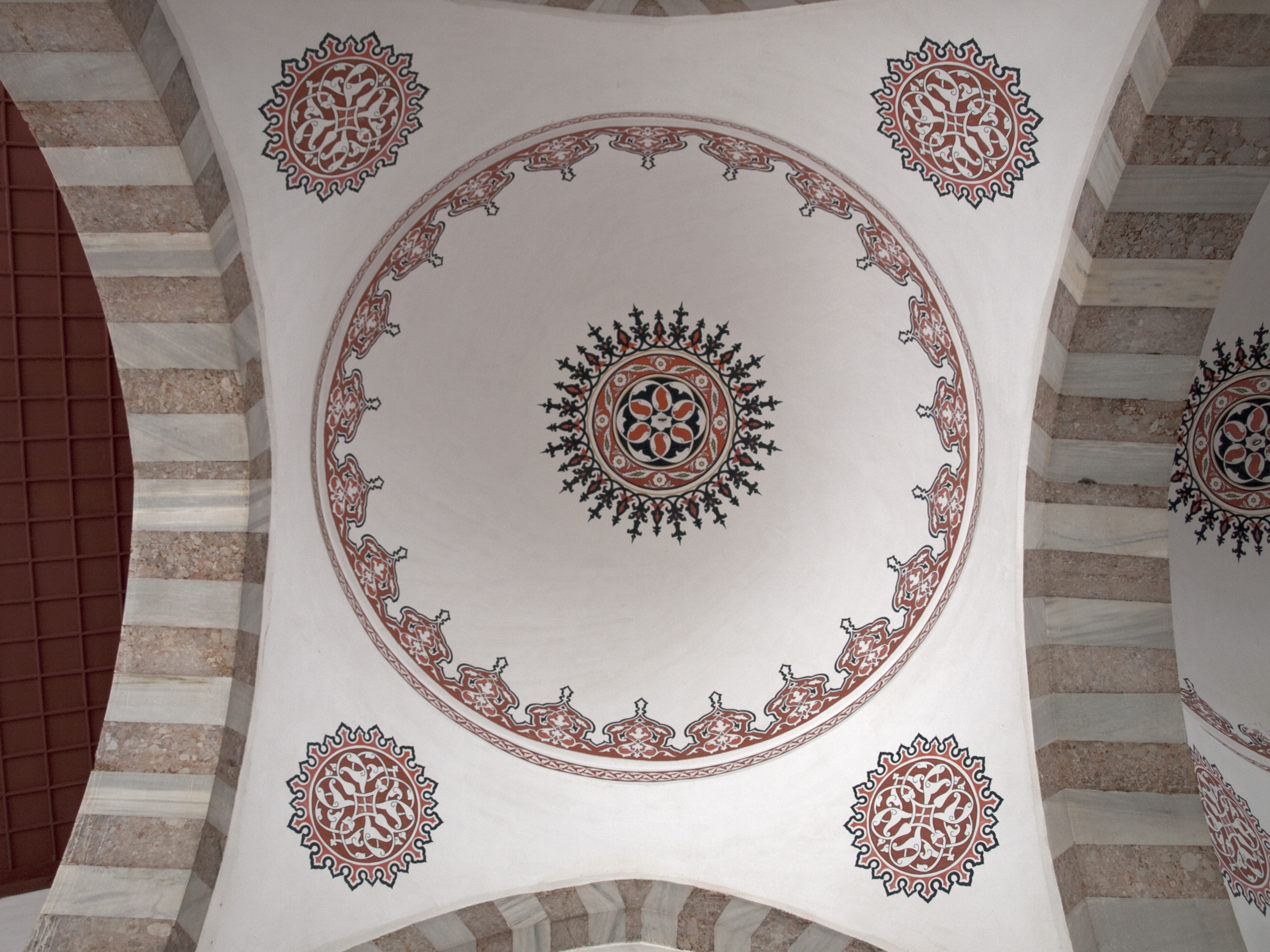
One of the five small domes in the portico.

The Atik Valide Mosque (Turkish: Atik Valide Camii, Eski Valide Camii), meaning Old Mother Mosque, is a 16th century Ottoman imperial mosque located on a hill above the large and densely populated district of Üsküdar, in Istanbul, Turkey. It was built for Nurbanu Sultan, the wife of Sultan Selim II and formed part of a large complex that included a madrasa, guest-rooms and a double caravanseray. The mosque was designed by the imperial architect Mimar Sinan. Planning began in 1571 for a small mosque with a single minaret. The mosque was subsequently expanded and was not completed until 1586, three years after Nurbanu's death.

== History ==
The Atik Valide Mosque (name translation: Old Queen Mother Mosque) was one of the most extensive mosque complexes in Istanbul area. The mosque was built for Nurbanu Sultan, the Venetian-born wife of Selim II and the mother of Murad III. She was the first valide sultan (queen mother) that exercised effective rule over the Ottoman Empire from the harem during the period known as the Sultanate of Women. For the Atik Valide mosques construction and maintenance, a foundation was established in 1583. The taxes of the Kurds from Kilis and the Reşwan tribe were included in the foundation.

The mosque was designed by the imperial architect Mimar Sinan and built in three stages. From the ground breaking in 1571 until the completion of the initial version of the mosque in 1574 another imperial architect supervised the work as Sinan was based in Edirne during the construction of the Selimiye Mosque. The second stage lasted from 1577 until 1578 and involved the addition of a second single-galleried minaret and a double portico. These changes were probably made as a result of Nurbanu's enhanced status as following accession of her son Murad III in 1574 she became the queen mother. Nurbanu died in 1583 and the third and final stage of construction took place between 1584 and 1586 after her death. The mosque was expanded laterally with the addition of a pair of small domes on each side of the central dome.

The mosque formed part of a large complex that also included a madrasa, a hadith college, a school for Quran recitation, an elementary school, a dervish convent, a hospital and a hospice complex that contained a guest-house and a double caravansaray. A bath-house was also built at this time.

== Architecture ==
The main space is covered by a central dome of 12.7 metres (42 ft) diameter supported on six arches arranged in a hexagon with two free-standing columns. The space is expanded by five exedral semi-domes, one of which contains the mihrab. The arch on the north side is filled with a flat wall which contains the entrance portal. The interior is surrounded on three sides by galleries.

The qibla wall and the mihrab recess are decorated with Iznik tiles. A pair of matched arched tiled panels on the side walls on either side of the mihrab depict spring blossoms and flowers. Above the windows under the portico on the north facade are ten rectangular calligraphic lunette panels. Four panels, two panels at each end, were added when the mosque was extended. They quote text from the Quran surah (48:3–4). The six central panel quote text from surah (39:53).

Upper floors were added to the hospice buildings in the 19th century when they were converted into a military hospital and prison.

== Gallery ==
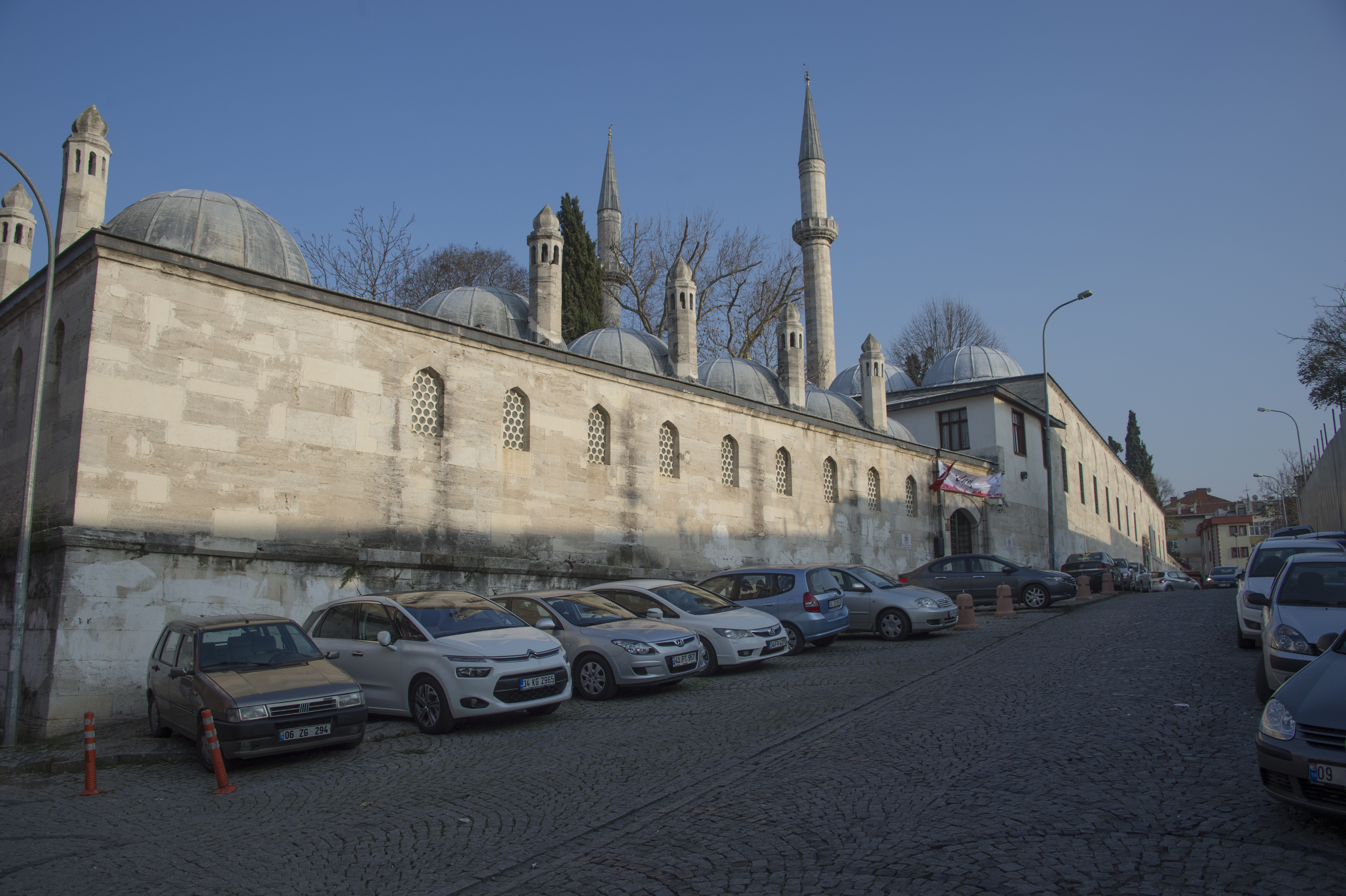
Atik Valide Mosque complex from the south, with the exterior of the medrese visible

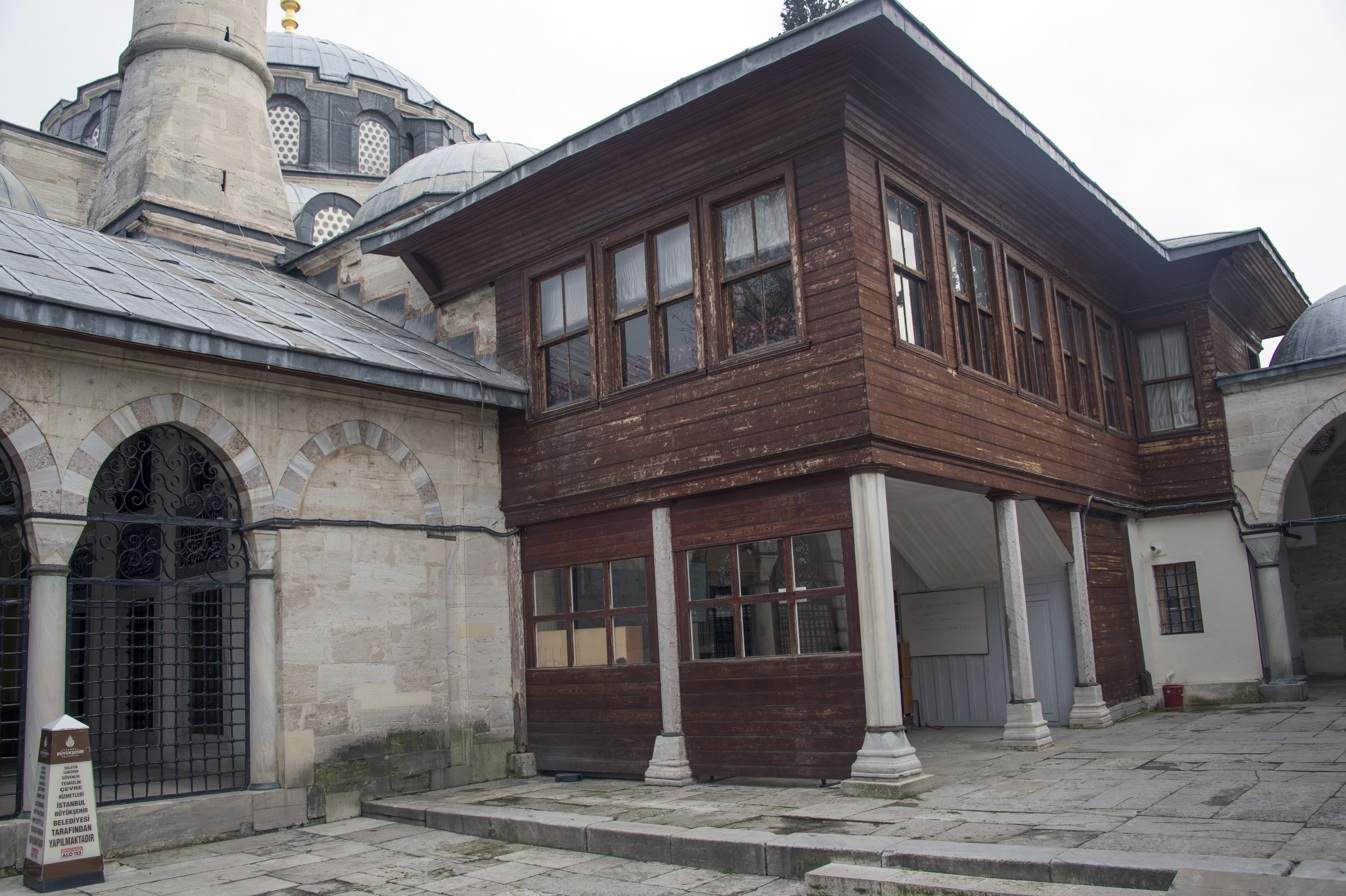
Atik Valide Mosque entrance side

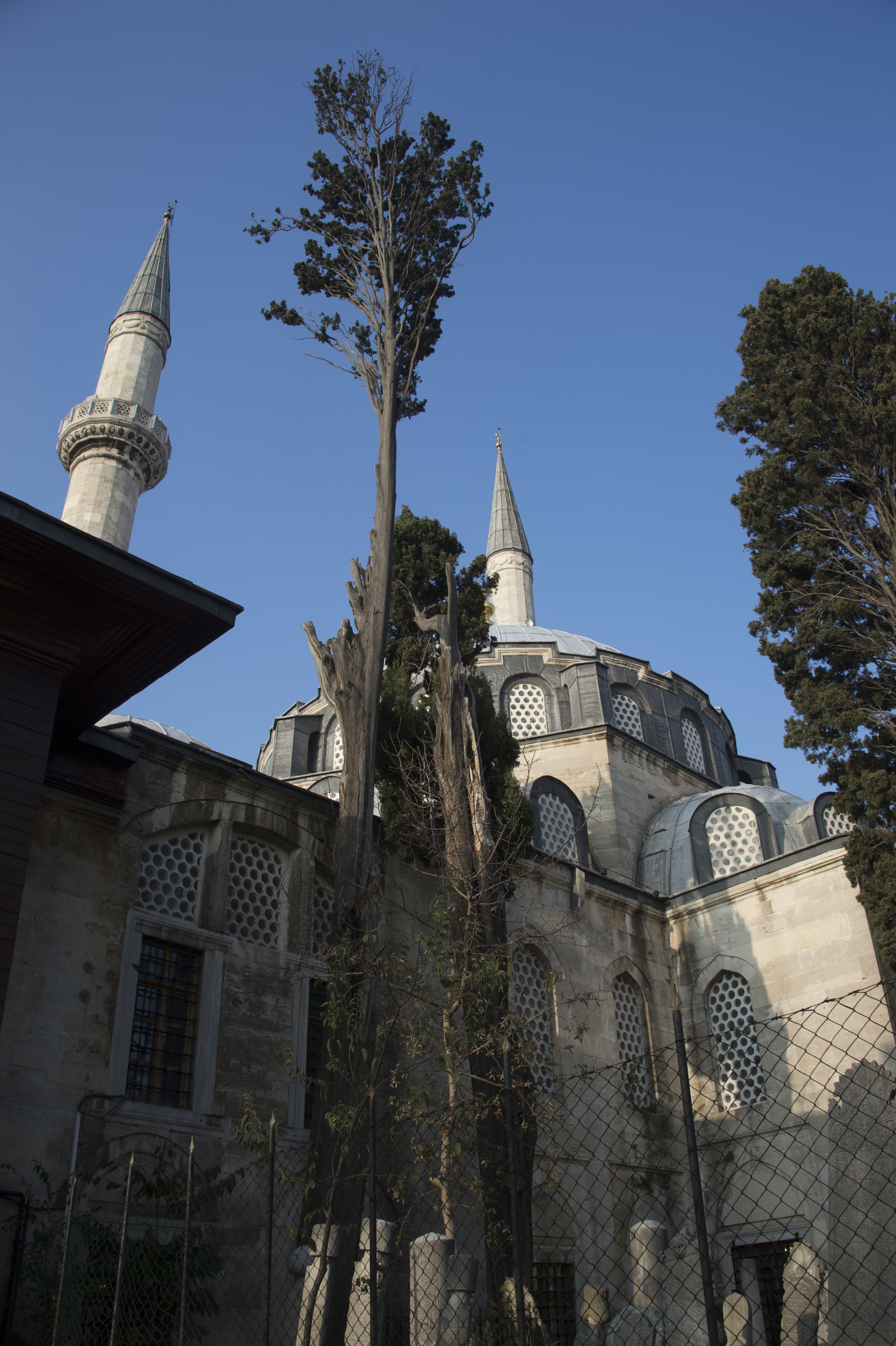
Atik Valide Mosque view from a side

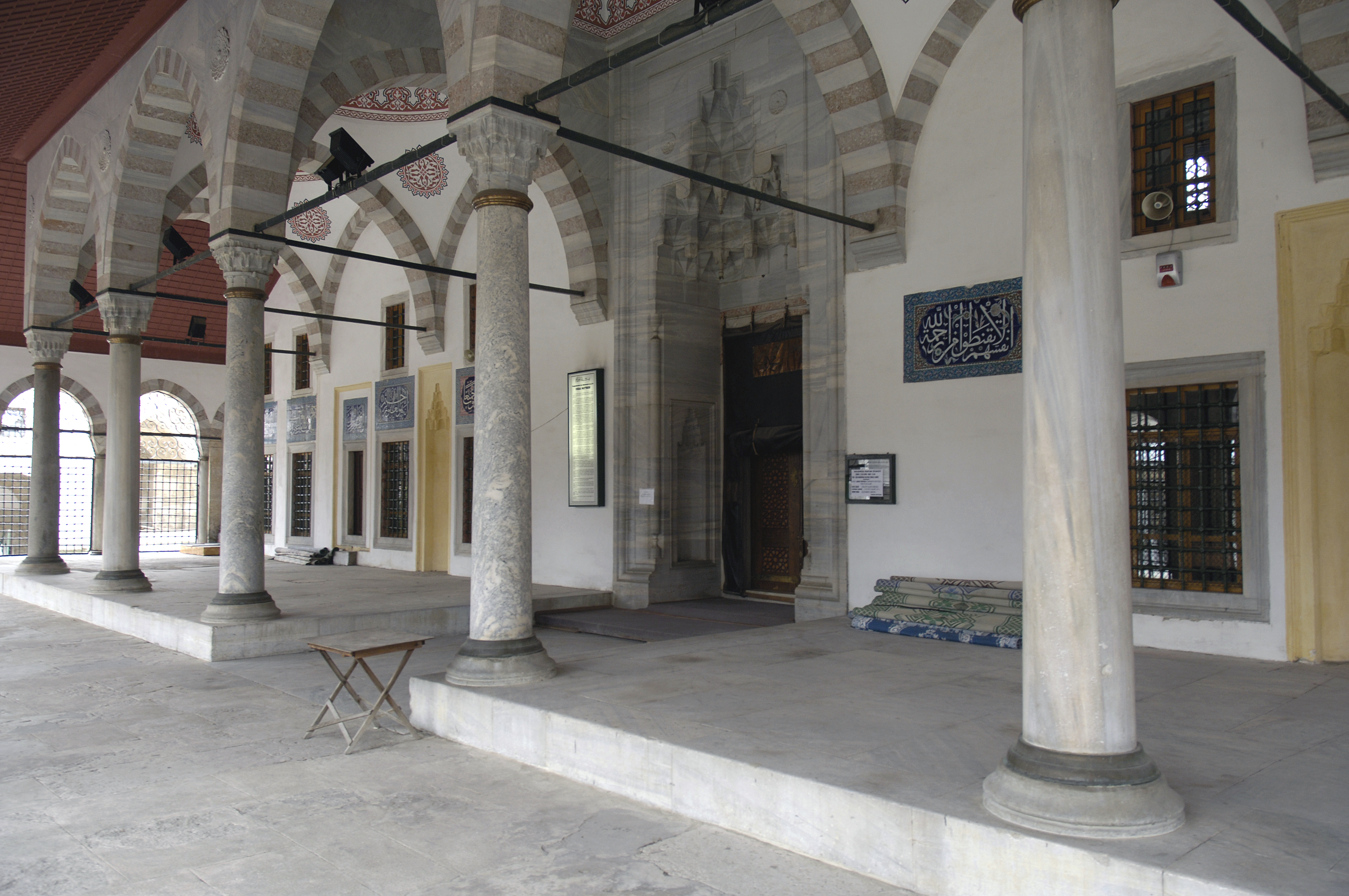
Atik Valide Mosque entrance

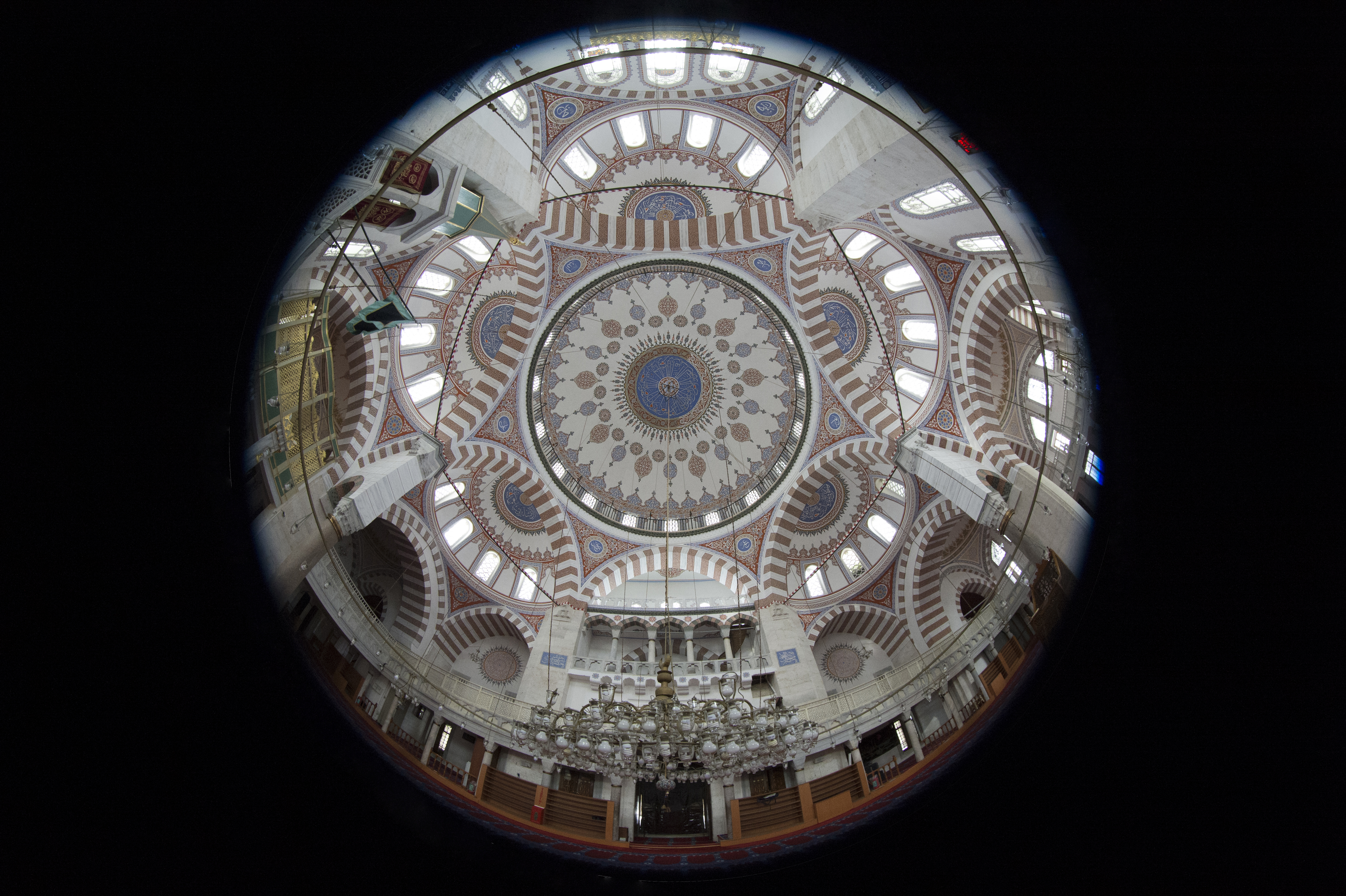
Atik Valide Mosque frish eye view

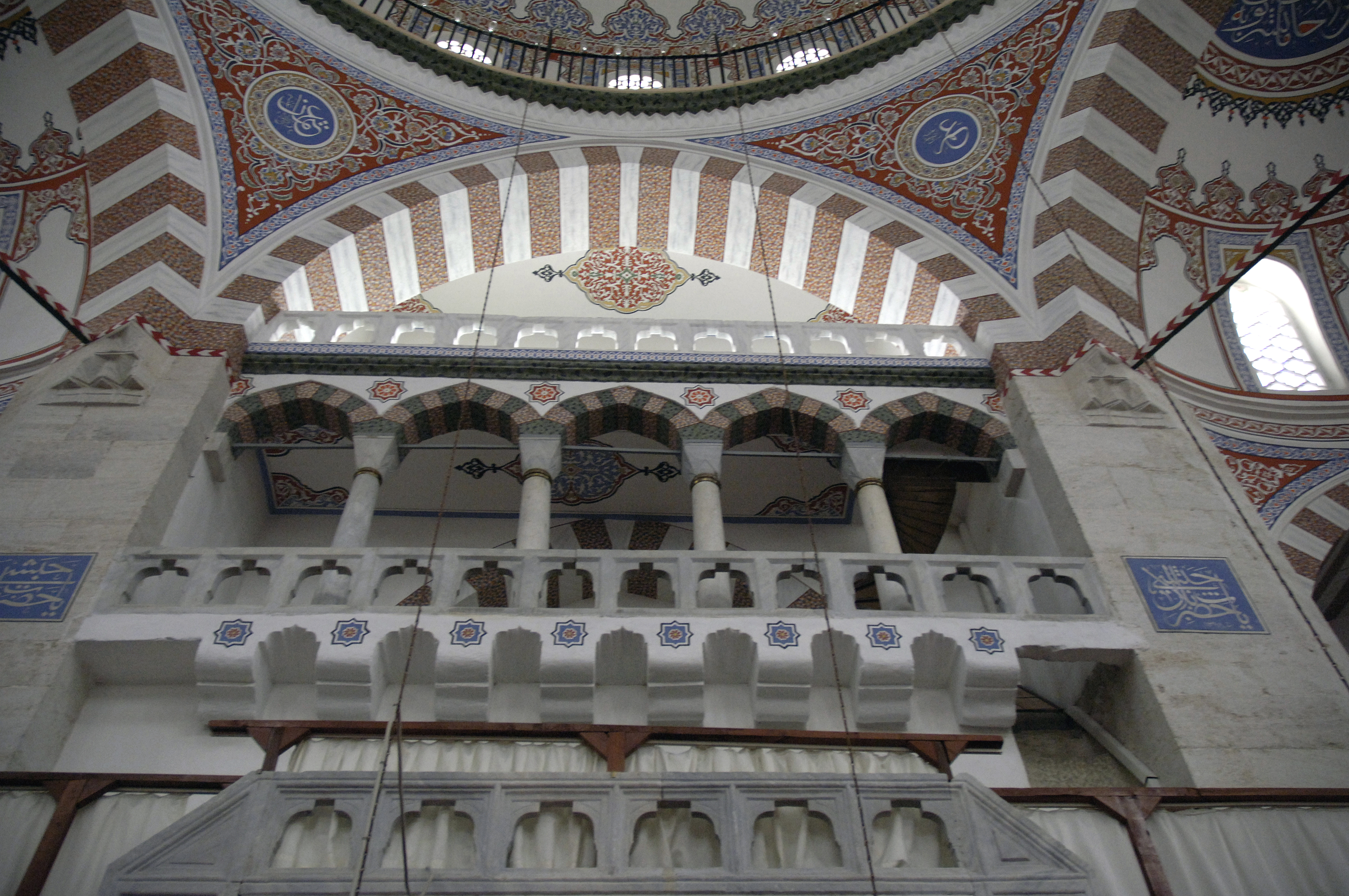
Atik Valide Mosque balcony

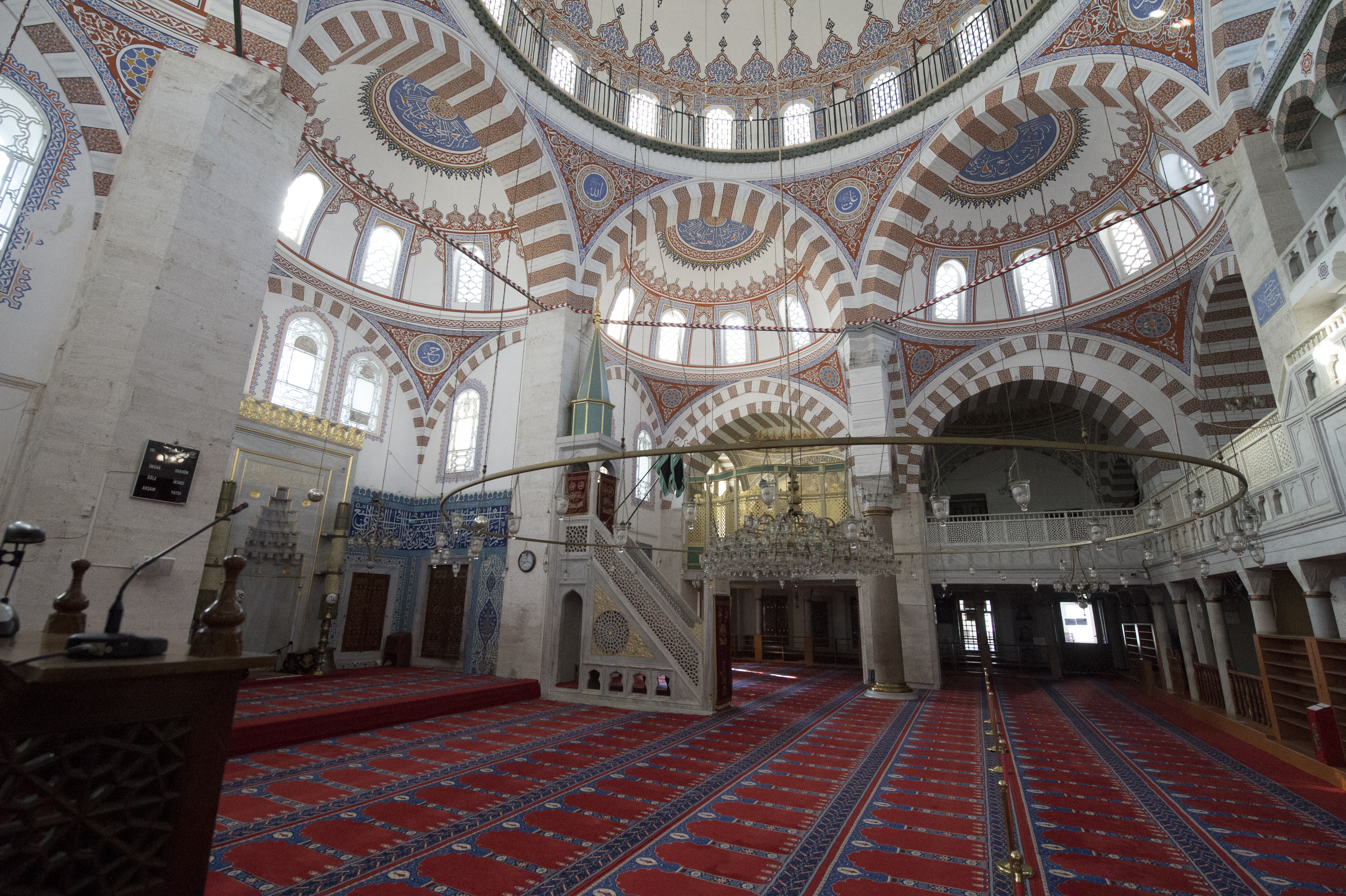
Atik Valide Mosque general view

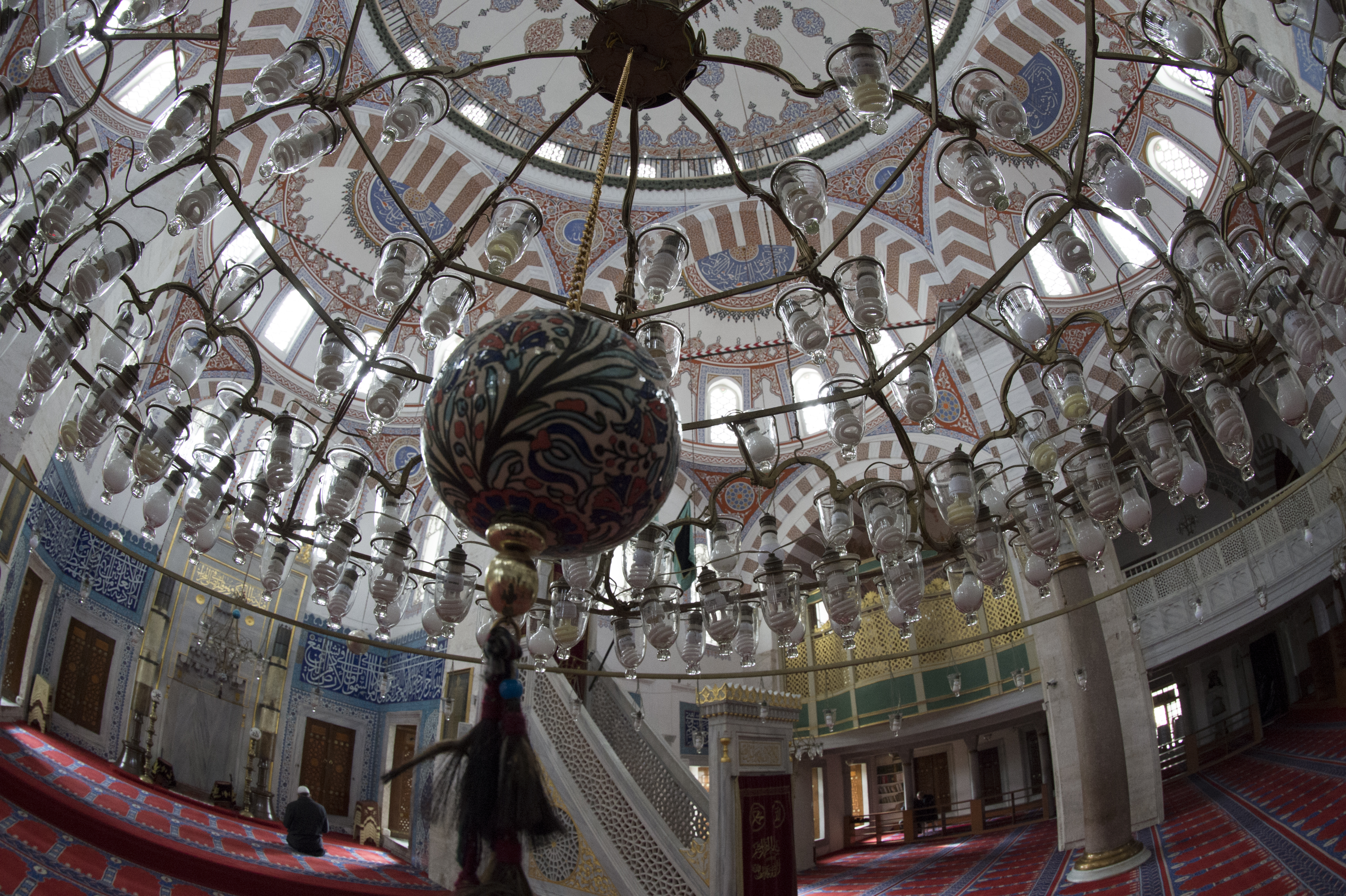
Atik Valide Mosque wide angle

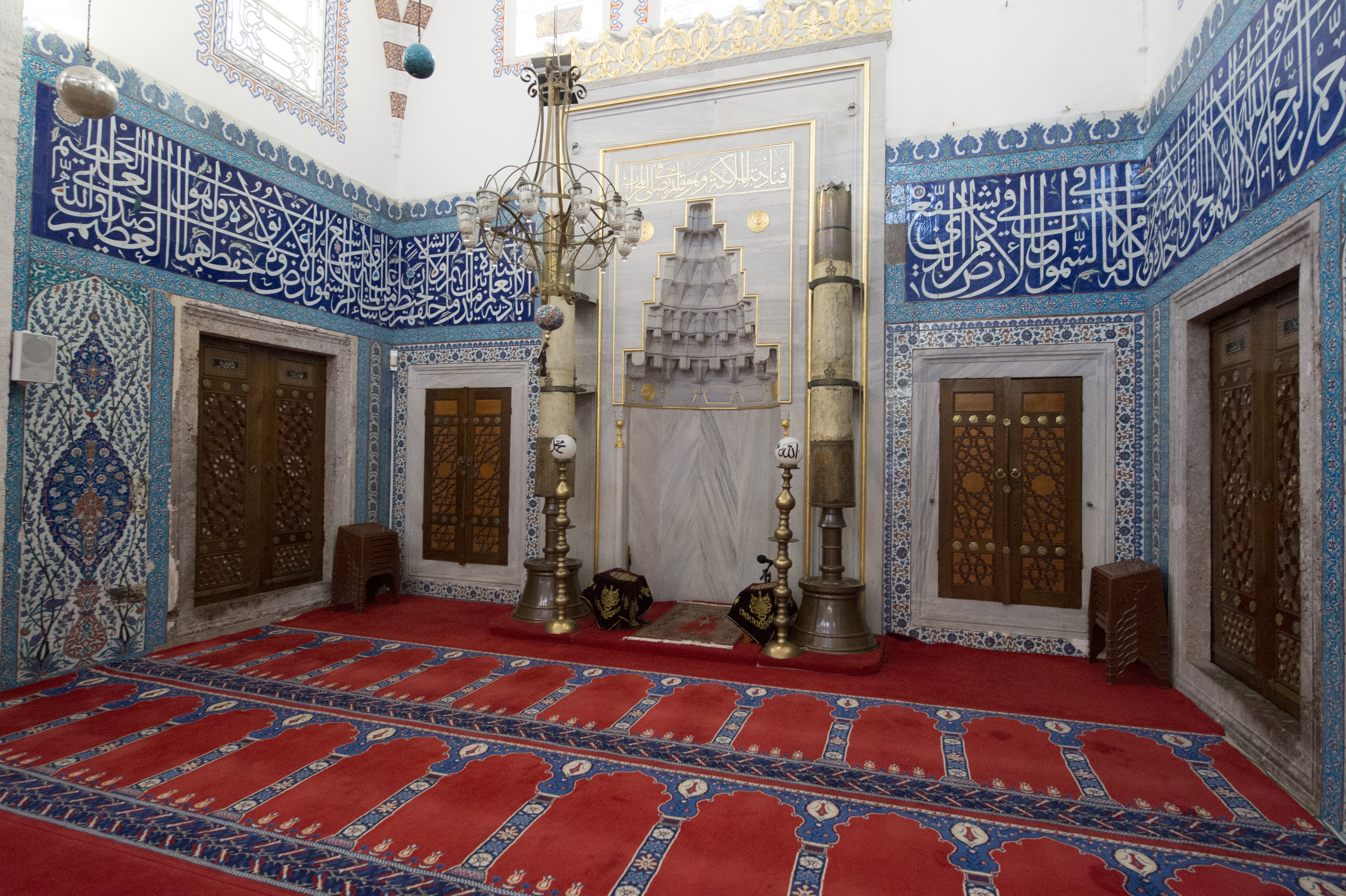
Atik Valide Mosque mihrab zone

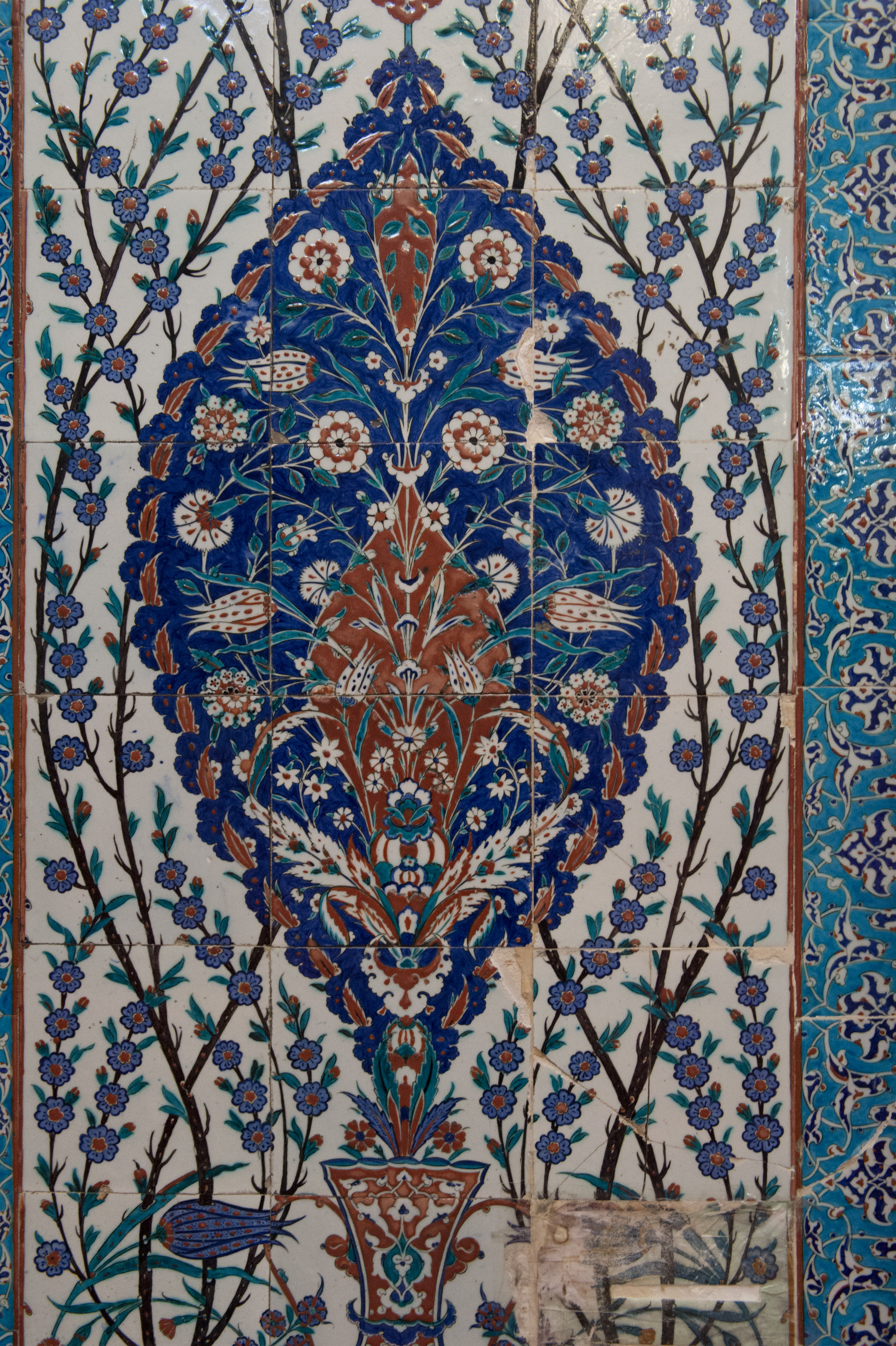
Atik Valide Mosque tiles

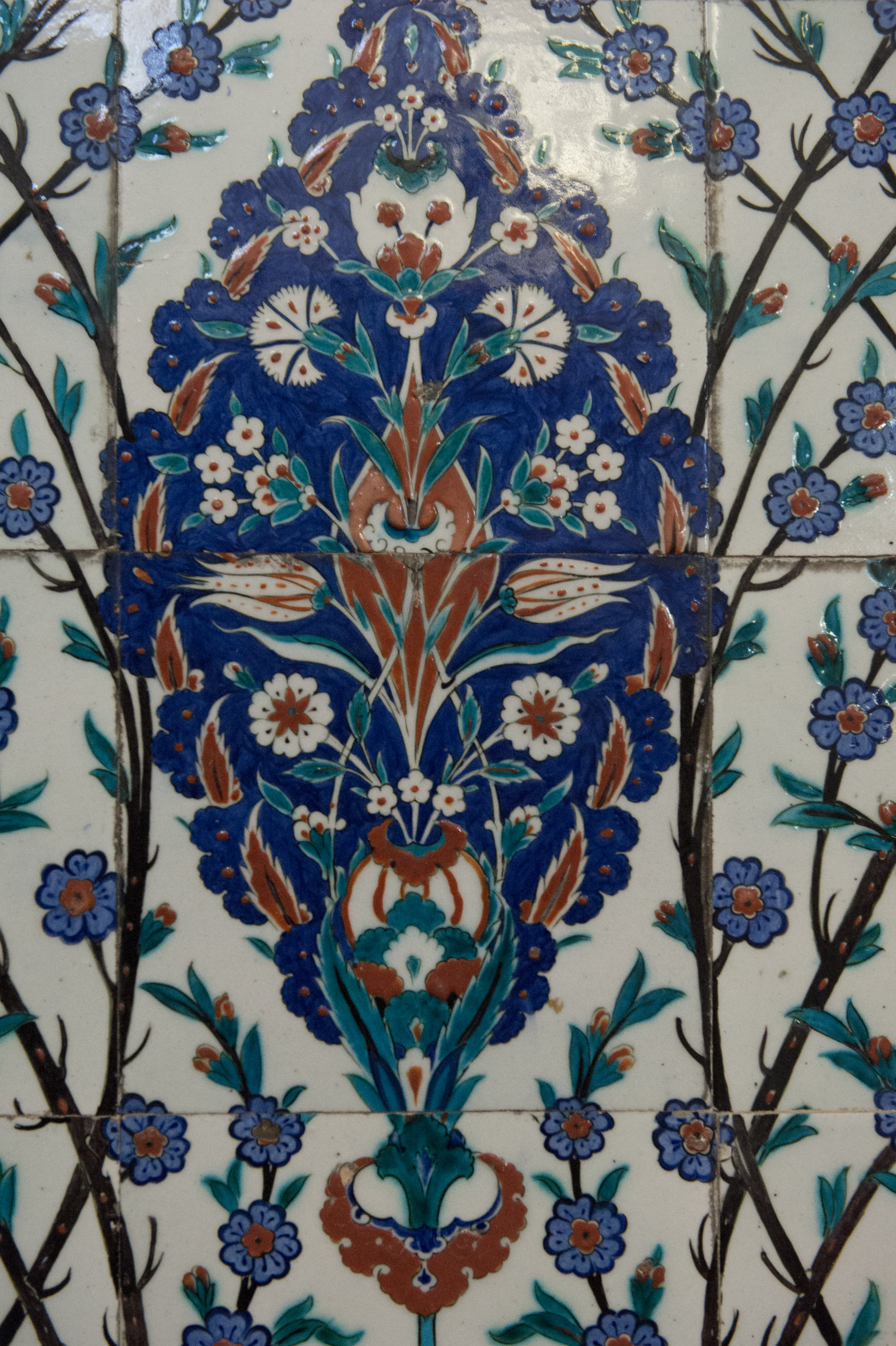
Atik Valide Mosque tiles

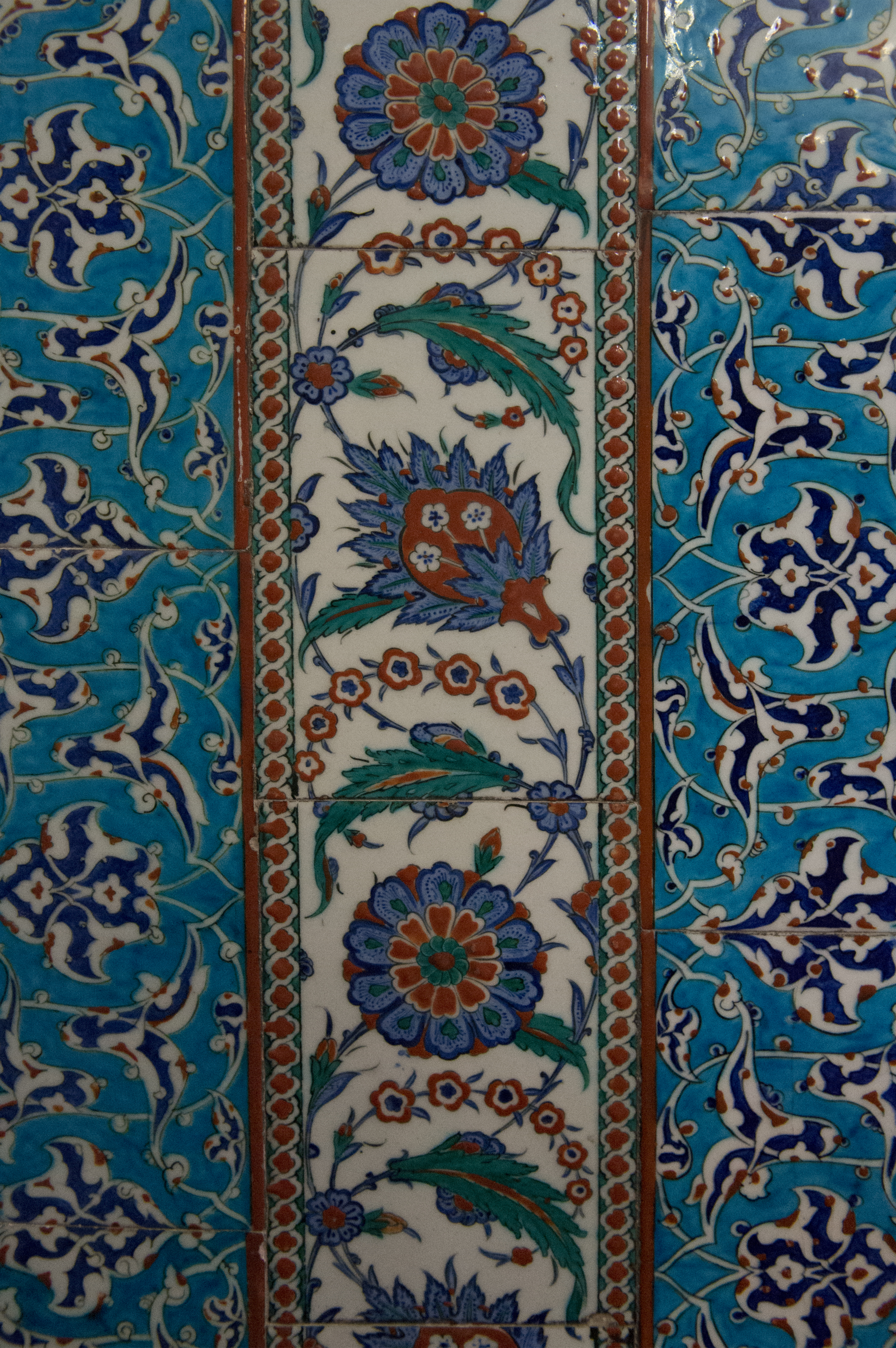
Atik Valide Mosque tiles

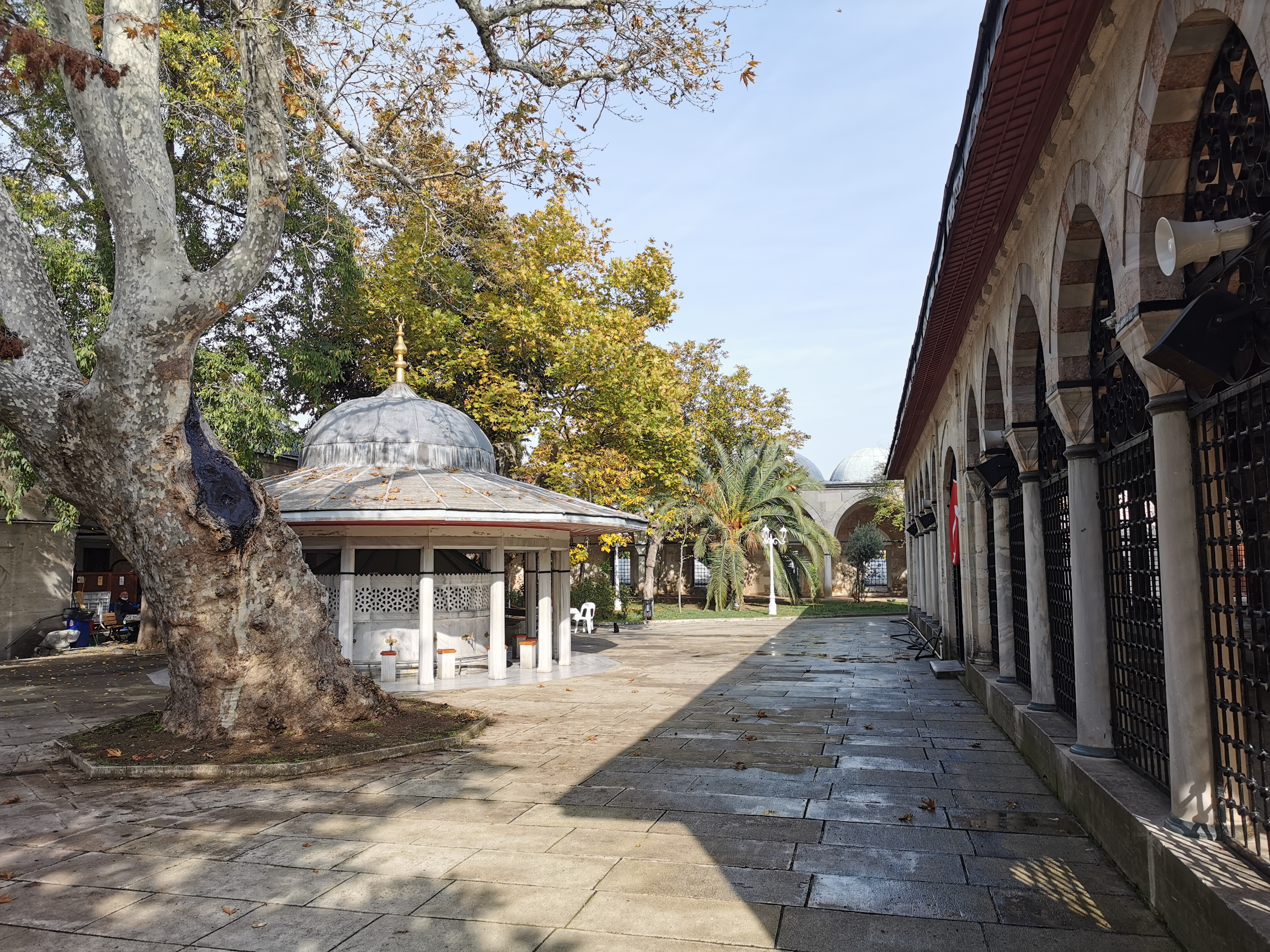
The courtyard (sahn).

== See also ==
- Yeni Valide Mosque
- Çinili Mosque
- List of Friday mosques designed by Mimar Sinan

== Sources ==
- Necipoğlu, Gülru (2005). The Age of Sinan: Architectural Culture in the Ottoman Empire. London: Reaktion Books. ISBN 978-1-86189-253-9.
- Governorship of Istanbul. "General information on Atik Valide Mosque". Archived from the original on 2012-01-19.
