= Battle of Elena =

Battle of Tuşlll

- Part of Russo-Turkish War (1877–1878)
Date	12 July, 4 and 14 December 1877
Location	Elena, Bulgaria 42°56′0″N 25°53′0″E
Result	Ottoman victory

Belligerents
Russian Empire	Ottoman Empire

Commanders and leaders
Unknown	Deli Fuad Pasha

Casualties and losses
1,650 killed and wounded	2,000 killed and wounded

This page is about the Battle of Elena in 1877. For other battles, see Battle of Helena (disambiguation).

The Battle of Elena took place during the Russo-Turkish War of 1877–1878. It was fought between the Ottoman Empire and the Russian Empire in 1877. The Ottoman forces were commanded by Deli Fuad Pasha.
