= Kurt İsmail Hakkı Pasha =

Ottoman field marshal (1818–1897)

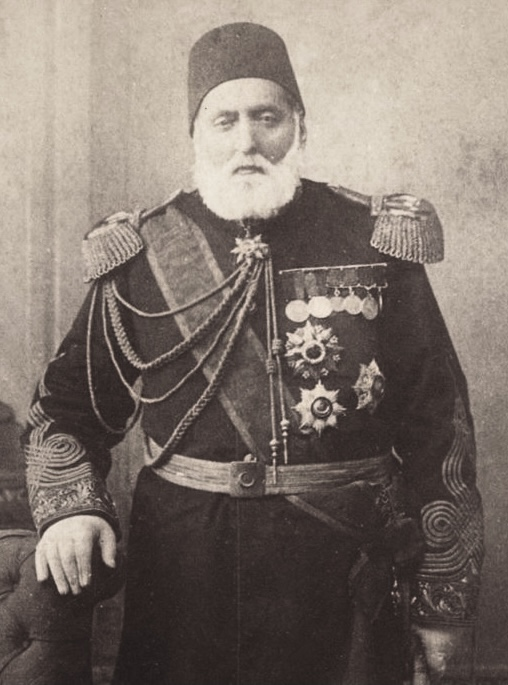
- Born: 1818; Kars, Ottoman Empire
- Died: 1897 (aged 78–79); Constantinople, Ottoman Empire
- Military career
- Allegiance: Ottoman Empire
- Branch: Ottoman Army
- Rank: Field marshal
- Conflicts: Russo-Turkish War (1877–1878)

Kurt İsmail Hakkı Pasha (1818–1897) was an Ottoman field marshal, who participated in the Russo-Turkish War of 1877–78.
