= Hamidian Period =

Sultan Abdul Hamid II's reign, from 1876 to 1909

The Hamidian period (c. 1878–1908), was named after Sultan Abdul Hamid II, the 34th sultan of the Ottoman Empire, from 1876 to 1909, and the last sultan to exert effective control over the fracturing state. The Hamidian period was contained within the larger period known as the Late Ottoman period (c. 1750–1918). The period effectively began after the First Constitutional Era with the suspension of the first constitution in 1878, and ended in 1908 after revolutionaries belonging to the Internal Committee of Union and Progress, an organization of the Young Turks movement, forced Sultan Abdul Hamid II to restore the Constitution, recall the parliament, and schedule an election, beginning the Second Constitutional Era (c. 1908–1920).

The reign of Abdülhamid II (1876–1909) is often regarded as having been a reaction against the Tanzimat, but, insofar as the essence of the Tanzimat reforms was centralization rather than liberalization, Abdülhamid may be seen as its fulfiller rather than its destroyer. The continued development of the army and administration, the formation of a gendarmerie, the growth of communications—especially the telegraph and railways—and the formation of an elaborate spy system enabled the sultan to monopolize power and crush opposition. His brutal repression of the Armenians in 1894–96 earned him the European title "red sultan". But Abdülhamid's reign also made positive advances in education (including the renovation of Istanbul University in 1900); legal reform, led by his grand vizier Mehmed Said Pasha; and economic development, through the construction of railways in Asia Minor and Syria with foreign capital and of the Hejaz Railway from Damascus to Medina with the help of subscriptions from Muslims in other countries.
