= Sıt areas in Turkey =

Aspect of Turkish archaeology

Sıt is the Turkish word for archaeological site. The governmental committees named Cultural Assets Conservation Committees determine the archaeological sites. As of 2015 there were 14861 sit areas in Turkey. With a history including Hittites, Hellenistic Age, Roman and Byzantine Empires, Seljuks and the Ottoman Empire, Turkey is full of archaeological sites Below is the number of Sıt areas in Turkey classified according to the Turkish provinces (il).

Province (il)	Number of Sıt areas
Adana Province	346
Adıyaman Province	149
Afyonkarahisar Province	419
Ağrı Province	47
Aksaray Province	164
Amasya Province	239
Ankara Province	527
Antalya Province	761
Ardahan Province	31
Artvin Province	7
Aydın Province	205
Balıkesir Province	232
Bartın Province	45
Batman Province	26
Bayburt Province	18
Bilecik Province	83
Bingöl Province	14
Bitlis Province	34
Bolu Province	82
Burdur Province	210
Bursa Province	241
Çanakkale Province	339
Çankırı Province	109
Çorum Province	92
Denizli Province	217
Diyarbakır Province	287
Düzce Province	28
Edirne Province	191
Elazığ Province	82
Erzincan Province	61
Erzurum Province	107
Eskişehir Province	513
Gaziantep Province	279
Giresun Province	10
Gümüşhane Province	22
Hakkari Province	4
Hatay Province	368
Iğdır Province	9
Isparta Province	211
Istanbul Province	98
İzmir Province	654
Kahramanmaraş Province	217
Karabük Province	67
Karaman Province	116
Kars Province	44
Kastamonu Province	97
Kayseri Province	389
Kilis Province	40
Kırıkkale Province	64
Kırklareli Province	211
Kırşehir Province	127
Kocaeli Province	82
Konya Province	851
Kütahya Province	291
Malatya Province	126
Manisa Province	321
Mardin Province	168
Mersin Province	533
Muğla Province	864
Muş Province	56
Nevşehir Province	154
Niğde Province	139
Ordu Province	36
Osmaniye Province	111
Rize Province	10
Sakarya Province	34
Samsun Province	129
Siirt Province	22
Sinop Province	128
Sivas Province	290
Şanlıurfa Province	634
Şırnak Province	19
Tekirdağ Province	181
Tokat Province	149
Trabzon Province	18
Tunceli Province	21
Uşak Province	165
Van Province	80
Yalova Province	17
Yozgat Province	234
Zonguldak Province	65
	14861

== Examples ==
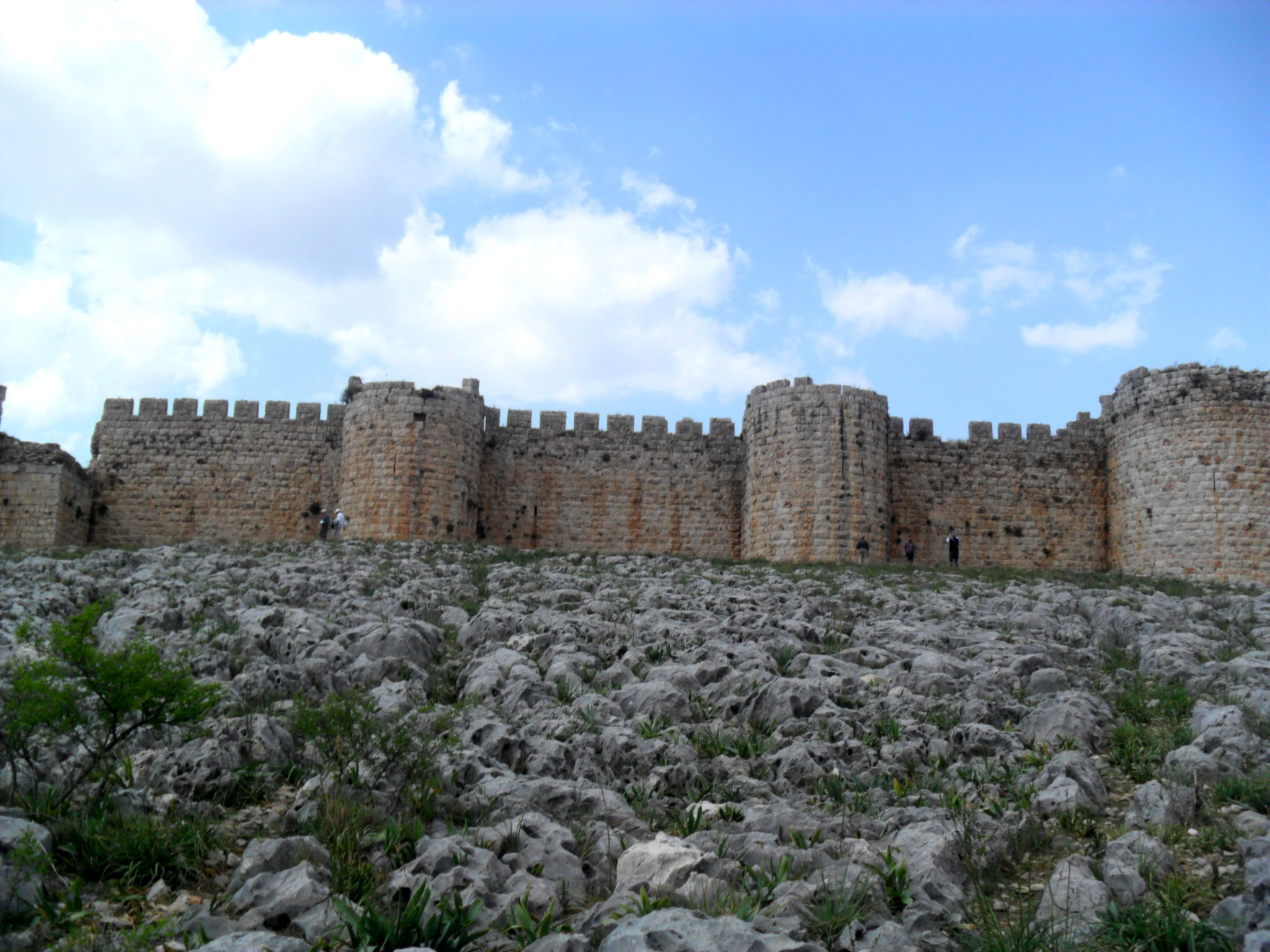
Anavarza Castle
Kozan, Adana Province

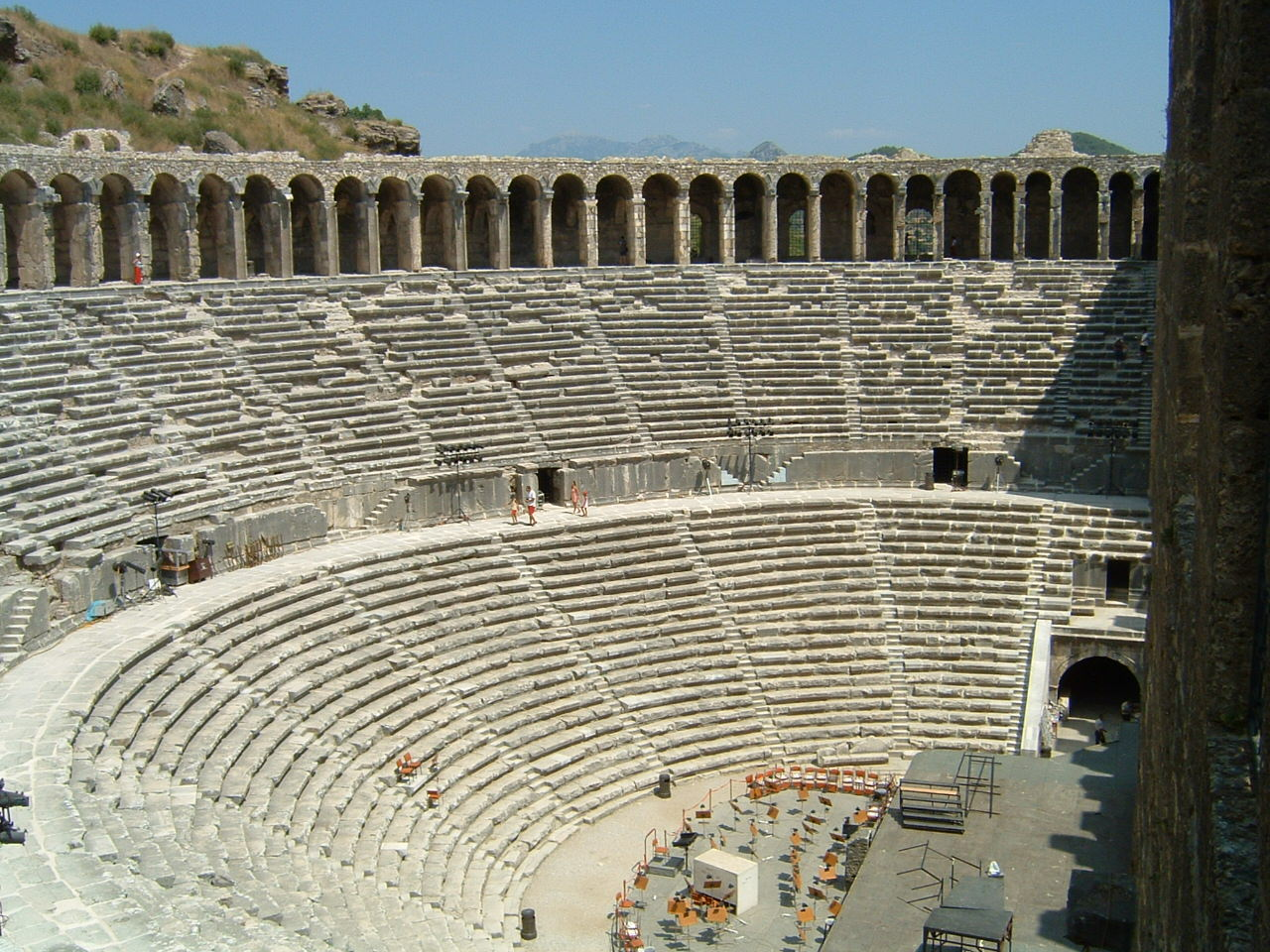
Aspendos Theatre
Serik, Antalya Province

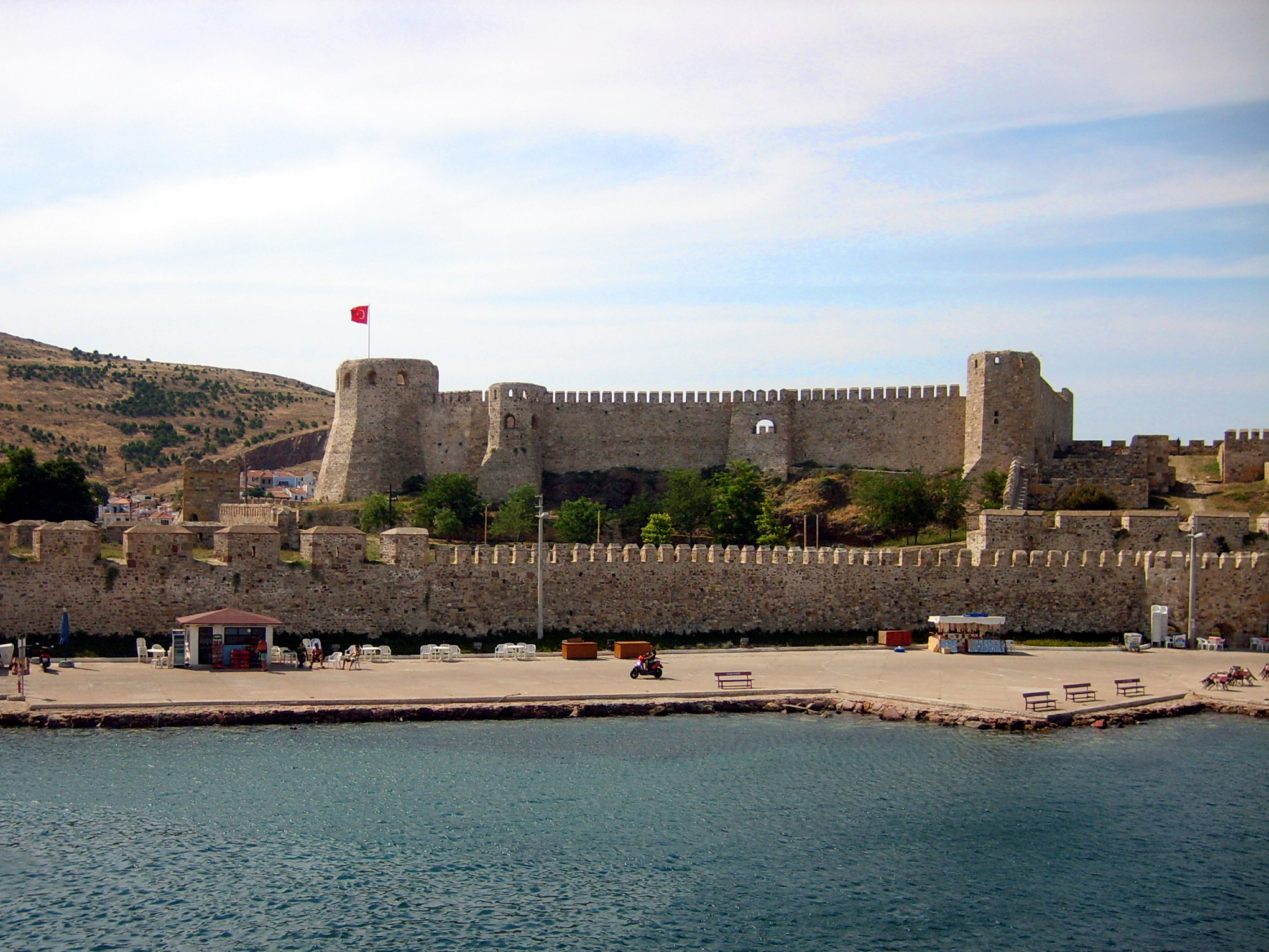
Bozcaada Castle
Bozacaada, Çanakkale Province

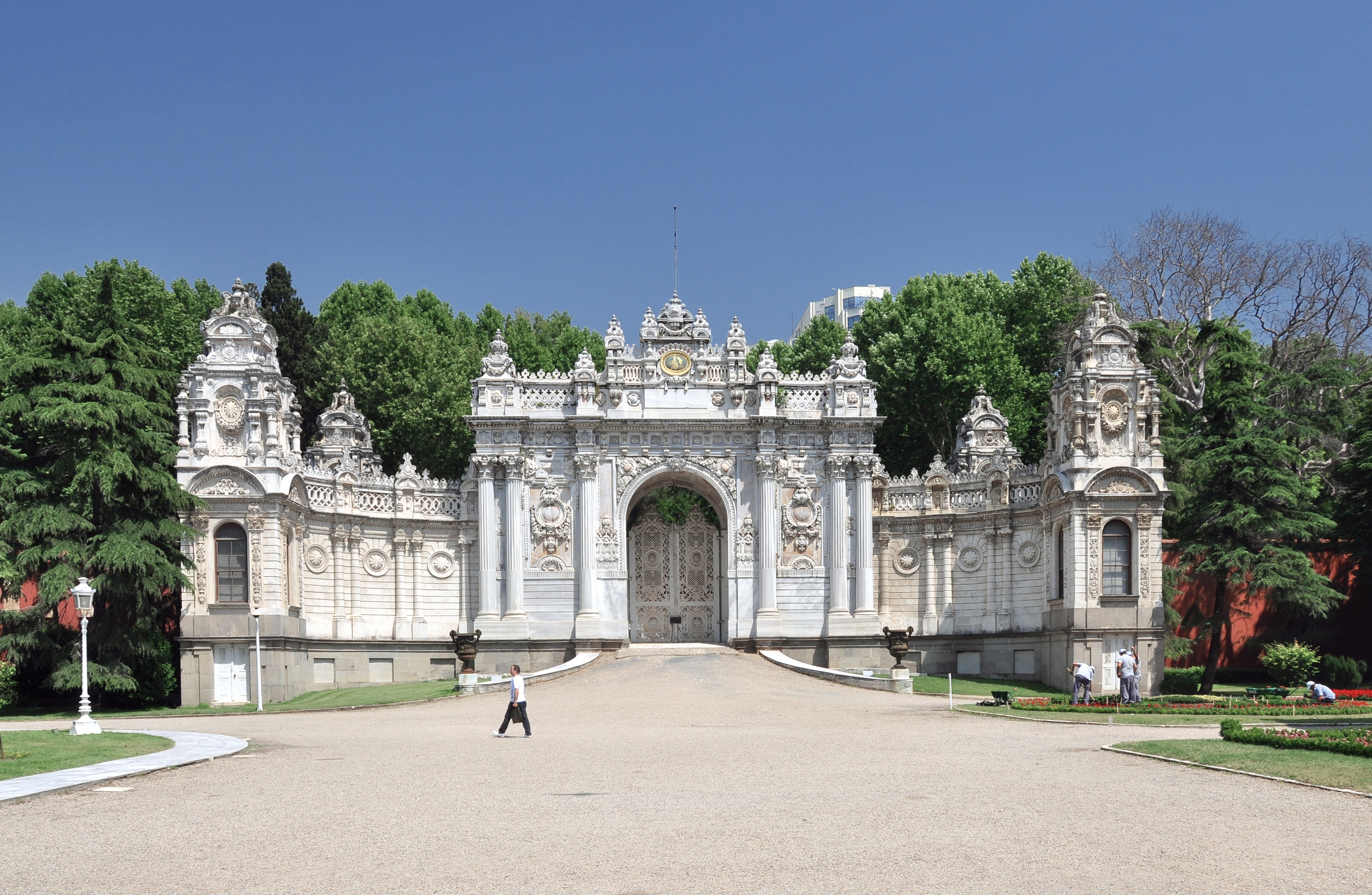
Dolmabahçe Palace, Istanbul

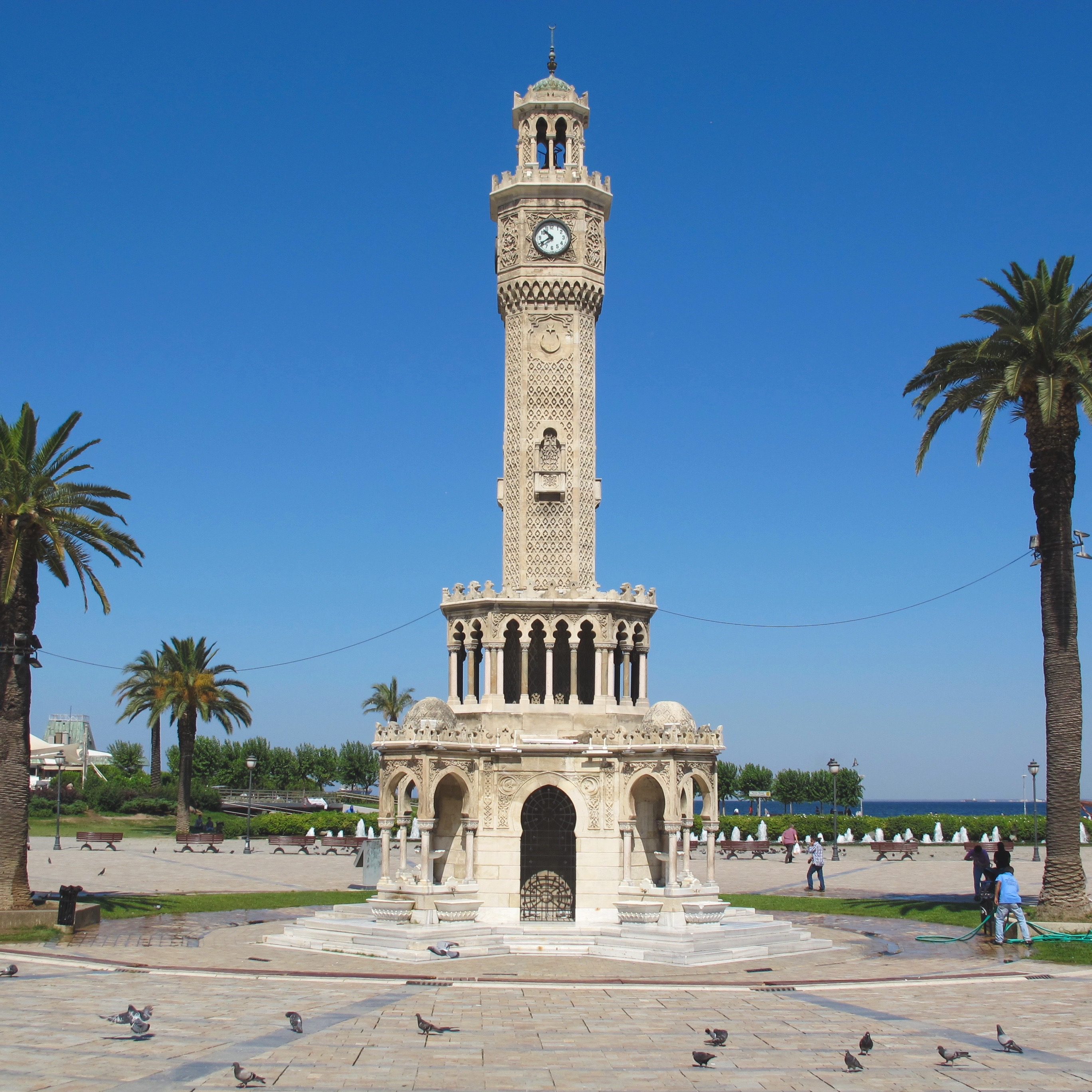
İzmir Clock Tower

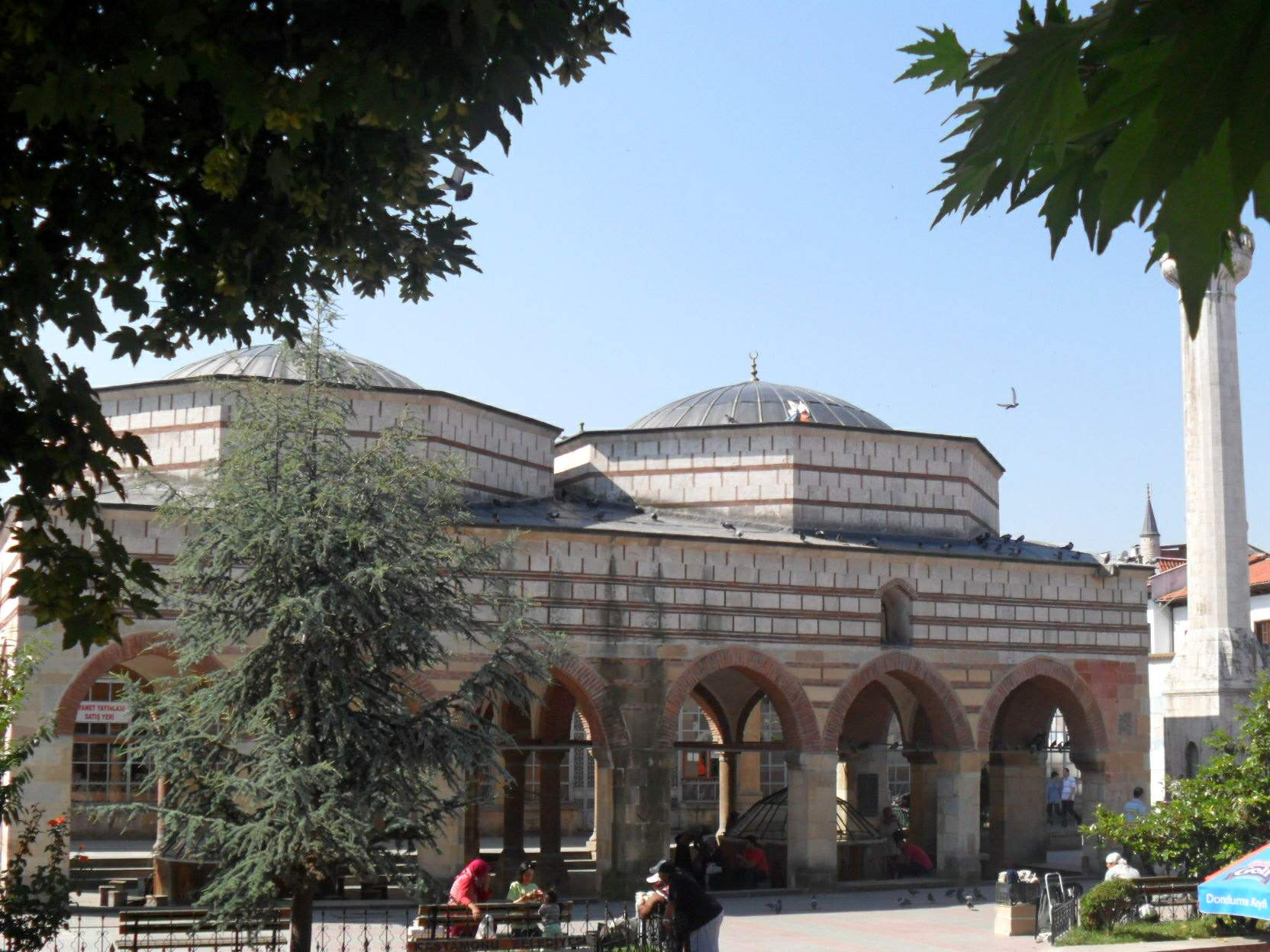
Nasrullah Mosque
Kastamonu

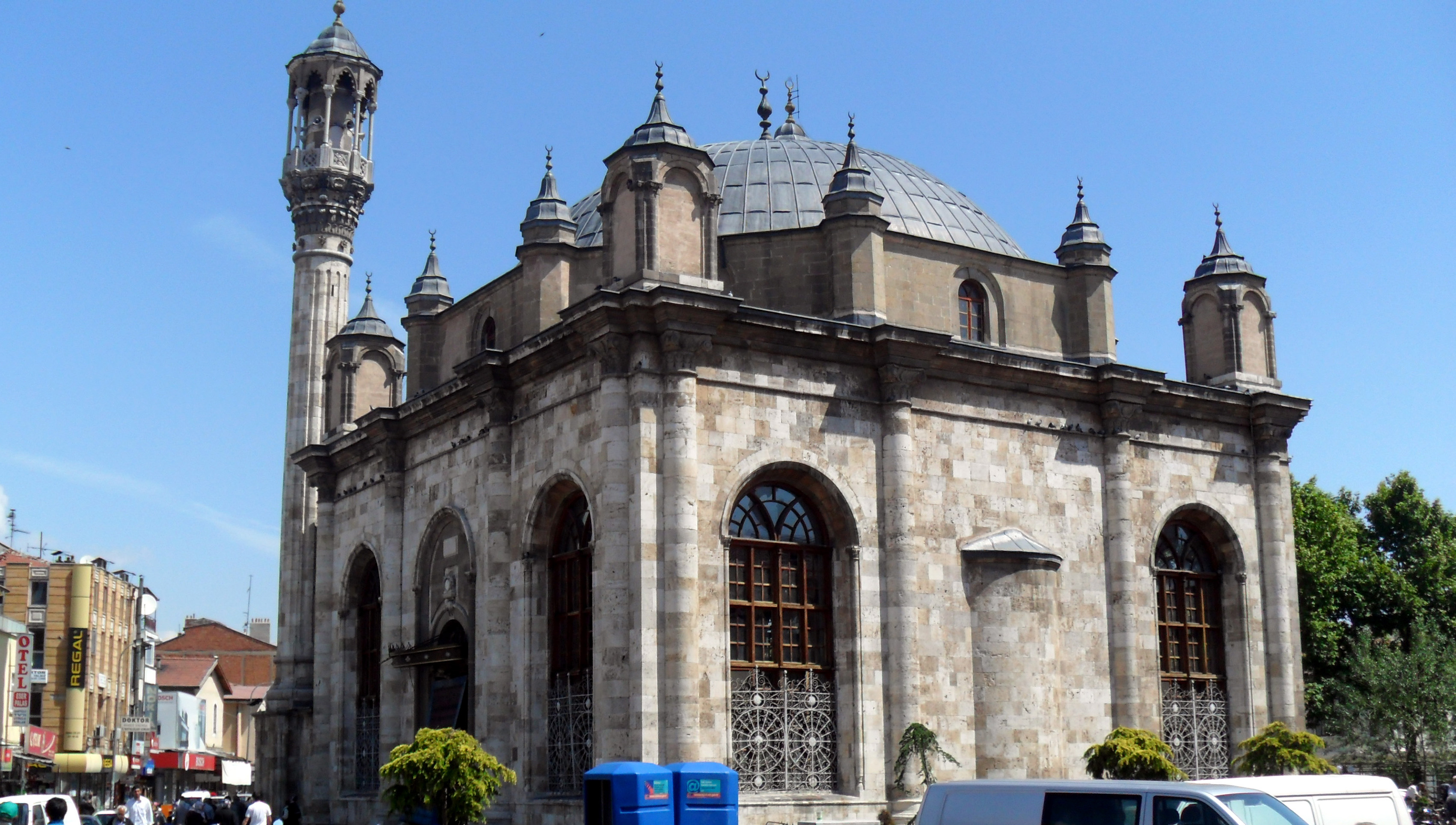
Aziziye Mosque
Konya

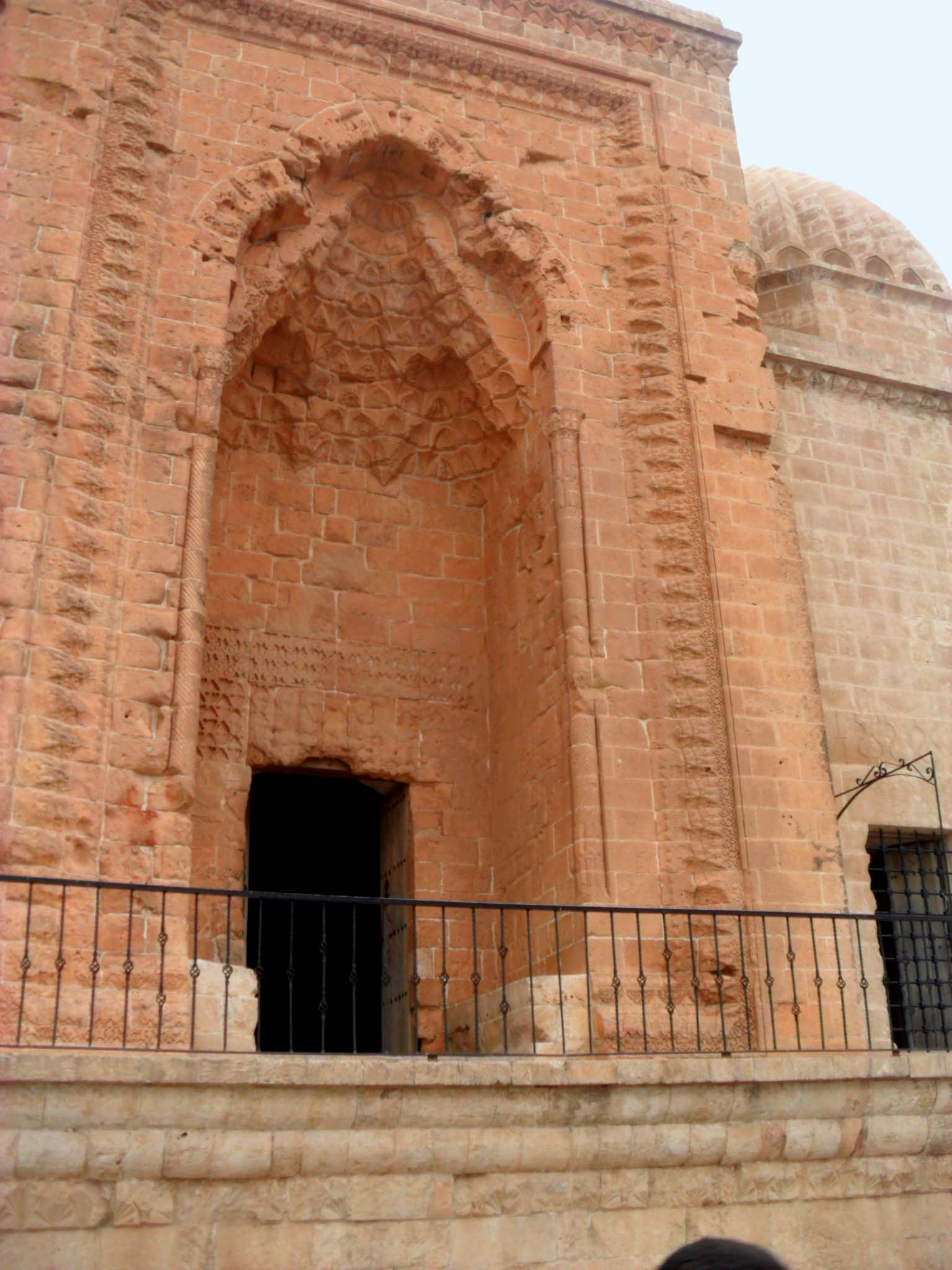
Kasımiye Medrese
Mardin

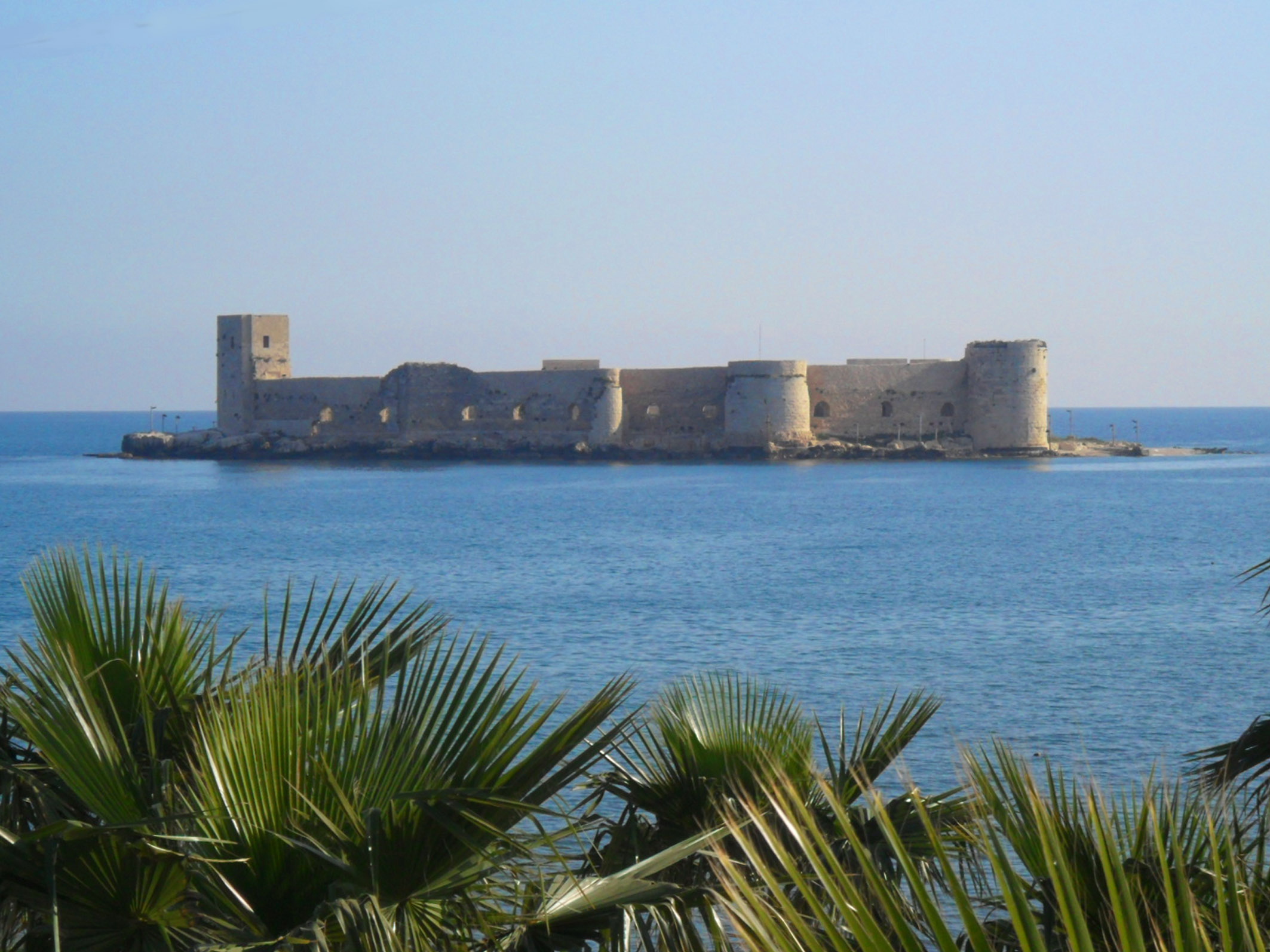
Maiden's Castle
Erdemli, Mersin Province

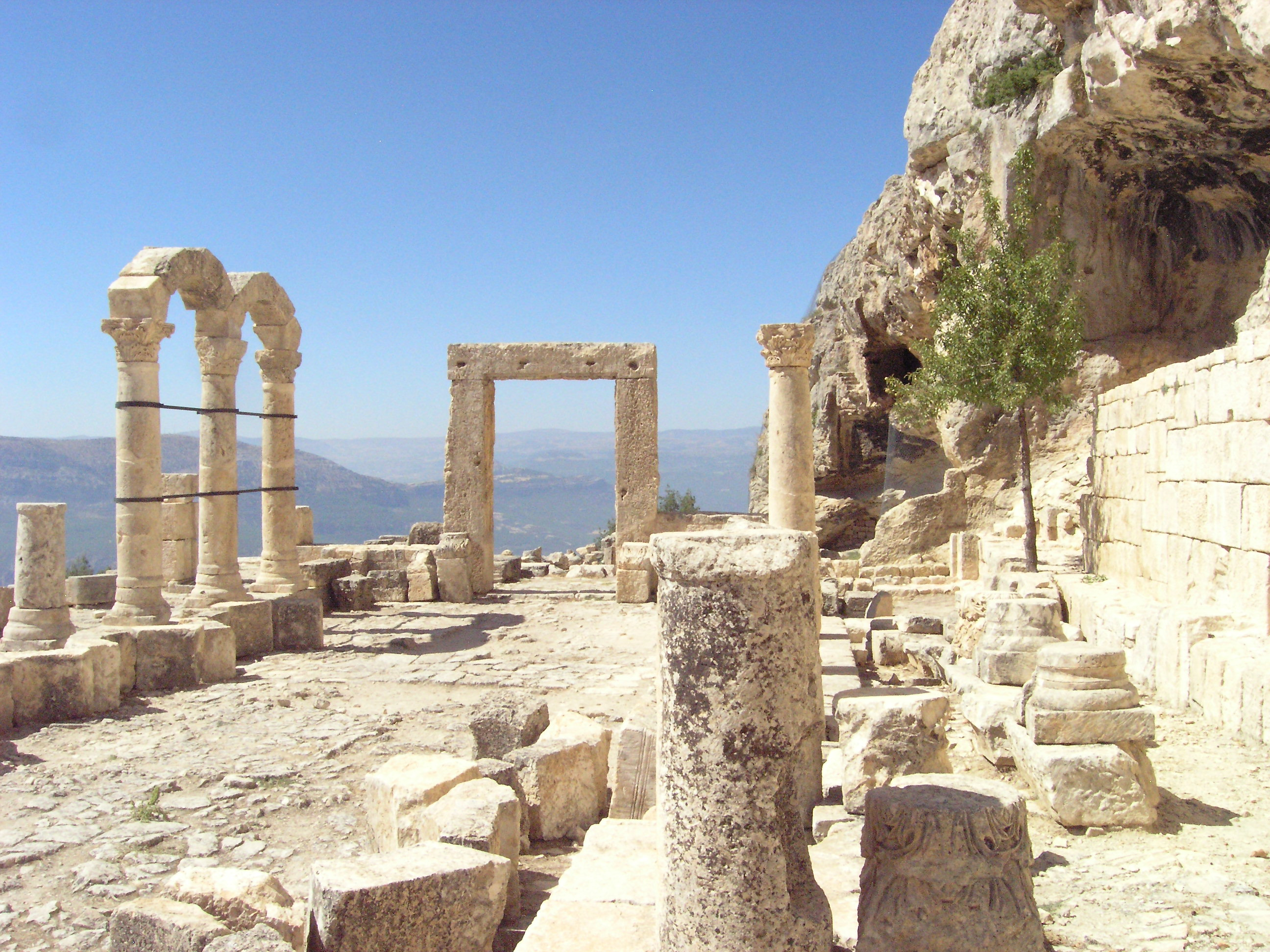
Alahan Monastery
Mut, Mersin Province

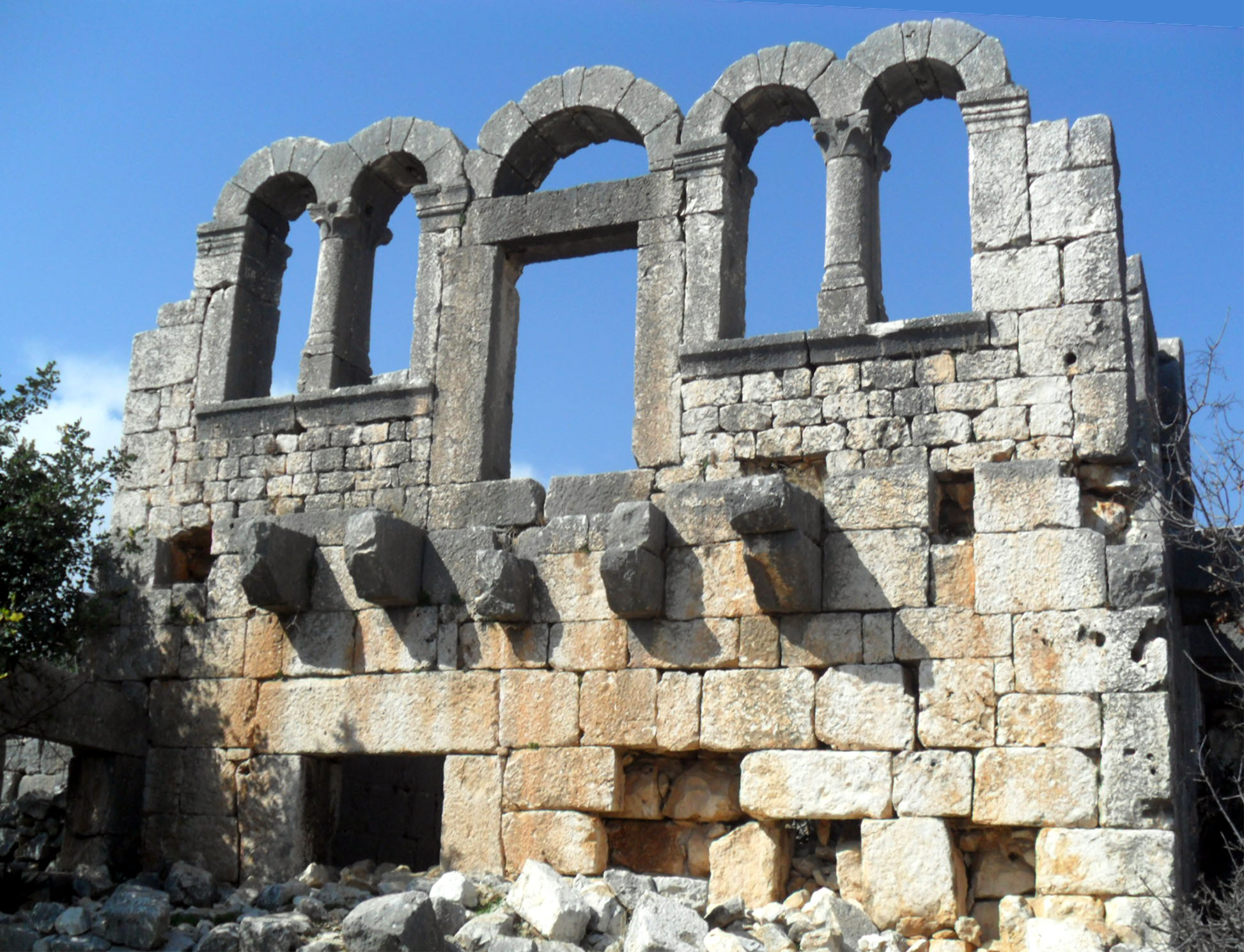
Karakabaklı Church
Silifke, Mersin Province

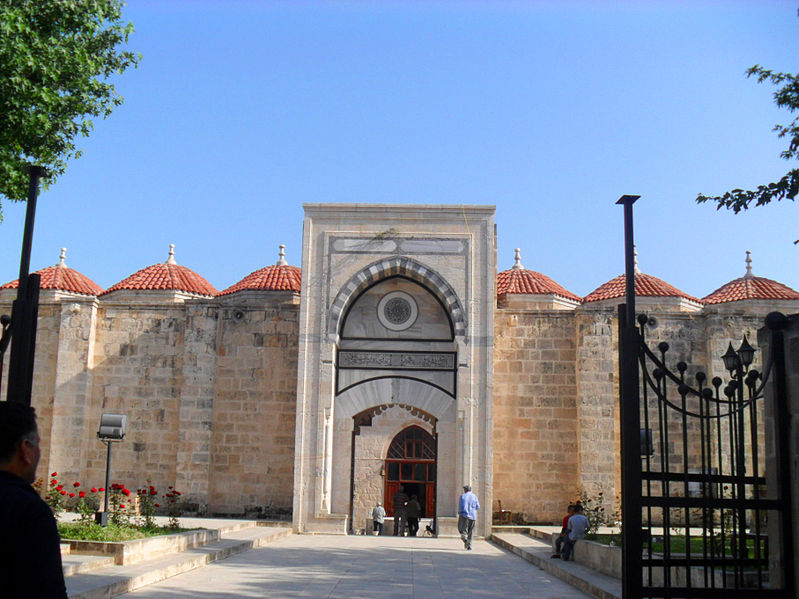
Tarsus Grand Mosque
Tarsus, Mersin Province
