= Çamoba =

Çamoba can refer to:

- Çamoba, Ezine
- Çamoba, Yenice
