= Kemallı =

Kemallı can refer to:

- Kemallı, Ezine
- Kemallı, Kızılırmak
- Kemalli, Sungurlu
