= Kızıltepe (disambiguation) =

Kızıltepe can refer to:

- Kızıltepe
- Kızıltepe, Ezine
- Kızıltepe, Maden
- Kızıltepe, Osmancık
- Cansel Kiziltepe (born 1975), German politician
