= Taştepe =

Taştepe can refer to:

- Taştepe, Ezine
- Taştepe, Lapseki
