= Yavaşlar =

Yavaşlar can refer to:

- Yavaşlar, Ezine
- Yavaşlar, Sandıklı
