= Ezine District =

District of Çanakkale Province, Turkey

- District
- Map showing Ezine District in Çanakkale Province

- Location in Turkey Ezine District (Marmara)
- Coordinates: 39°47′N 26°20′E
- Country: Turkey
- Province: Çanakkale
- Seat: Ezine

Government
  - Kaymakam: Yunus Kızılgüneş
- Area: 727 km^{2} (281 sq mi)
- Population (2021): 32,374
  - Density: 45/km^{2} (120/sq mi)
- Time zone: UTC+3 (TRT)
- Website: www.ezine.gov.tr

Ezine District is a district of the Çanakkale Province of Turkey. Its seat is the town of Ezine. Its area is 727 km^{2}, and its population is 32,374 (2021).

== Composition ==
There are two municipalities in Ezine District:

- Ezine
- Geyikli

There are 49 villages in Ezine District:

- Akçakeçili
- Akköy
- Aladağ
- Alemşah
- Arasanlı
- Bahçeli
- Balıklı
- Belen
- Bozalan
- Bozeli
- Bozköy
- Çamköy
- Çamlıca
- Çamoba
- Çarıksız
- Çetmi
- Çınarköy
- Dalyan
- Derbentbaşı
- Gökçebayır
- Güllüce
- Hisaralan
- Karadağ
- Karagömlek
- Kayacık
- Kemallı
- Kızılköy
- Kızıltepe
- Köprübaşı
- Körüktaşı
- Köseler
- Kumburun
- Mahmudiye
- Mecidiye
- Pazarköy
- Pınarbaşı
- Şapköy
- Sarısöğüt
- Sarpdere
- Taştepe
- Tavaklı
- Uluköy
- Üsküfçü
- Üvecik
- Yahyaçavuş
- Yavaşlar
- Yaylacık
- Yeniköy
- Yenioba
