= Çamköy, Ezine =

Village in Turkey

Çamköy
- Village
- Location in Turkey Çamköy (Marmara)
- Coordinates: 39.8347°N 26.2963°E
- Country: Turkey
- Province: Çanakkale
- District: Ezine
- Population (2021): 112
- Time zone: UTC+3 (TRT)

Çamköy is a village in the Ezine District of Çanakkale Province in Turkey. Its population is 112 (2021).
