= Alemşah, Ezine =

Village in Turkey

Alemşah
- Village
- Location in Turkey Alemşah (Marmara)
- Coordinates: 39°41′N 26°12′E
- Country: Turkey
- Province: Çanakkale
- District: Ezine
- Population (2021): 136
- Time zone: UTC+3 (TRT)

Alemşah is a village in the Ezine District of Çanakkale Province in Turkey. Its population is 136 (2021).
