= Bozcaada, Çanakkale =

Bozcaada
- Municipality
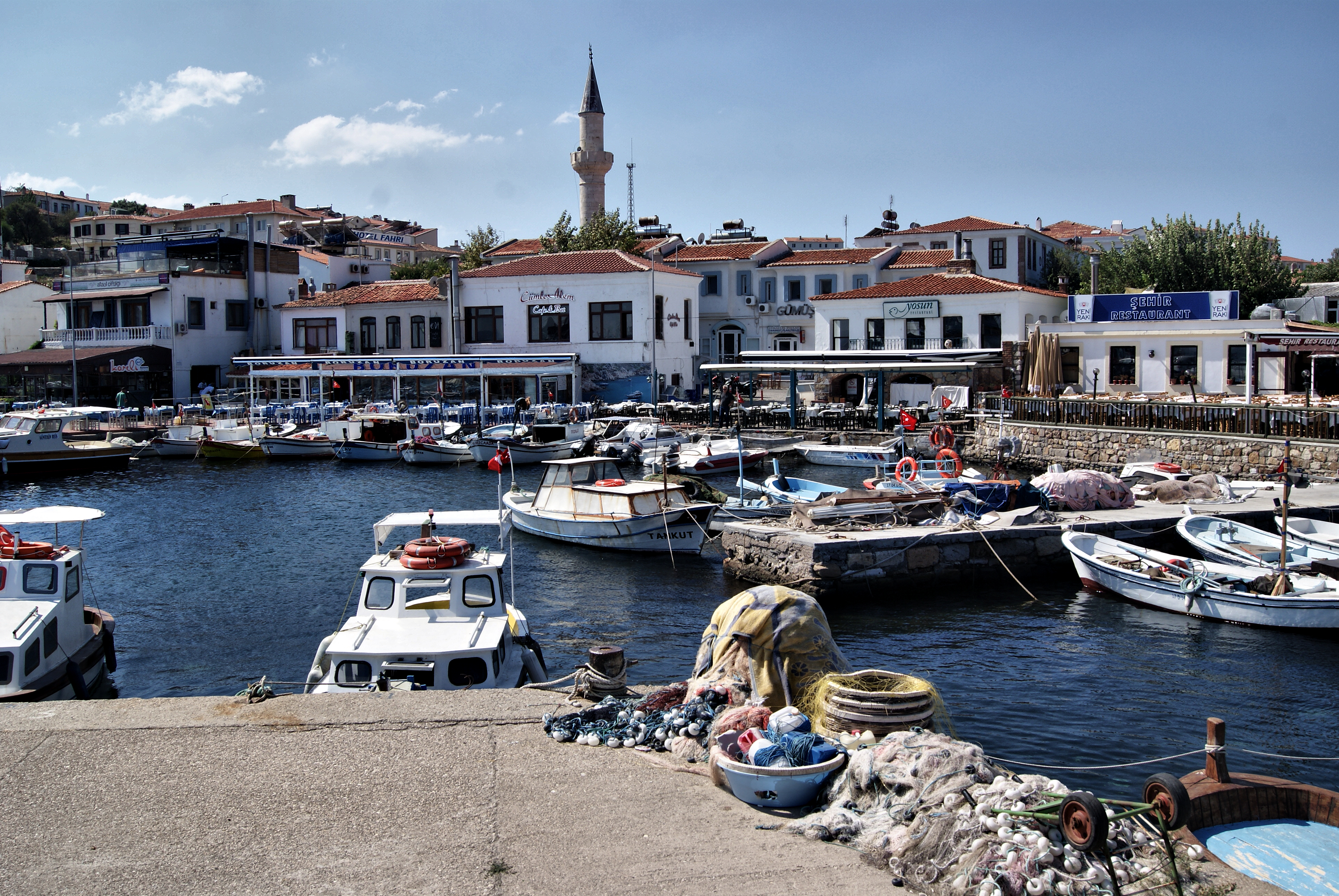
- Bozcaada harbor

- Location within Turkey Location within Marmara
- Coordinates: 39°50′N 26°04′E
- Country: Turkey
- Province: Çanakkale

Government
  - Mayor: Yahya Göztepe (CHP)
- Area: 36.7 km^{2} (14.2 sq mi)
- Elevation: 5 m (16 ft)
- Population (2022): 3,120
  - Density: 85.0/km^{2} (220/sq mi)
- Time zone: UTC+3 (TRT)
- Postal code: 17680
- Area code: 0286
- Website: www.bozcaada.bel.tr

Bozcaada is a municipality in Çanakkale Province, Turkey. It is the seat of and coterminous with the Bozcaada District, which covers the North Aegean island of Bozcaada and a number of islets around it. Its area is 37 km^{2}, and its population is 3,120 (2022). Its mayor is Hakan Can Yılmaz (CHP), and its kaymakam (district governor) is Muhammet Mustafa Kara.

== Geography ==
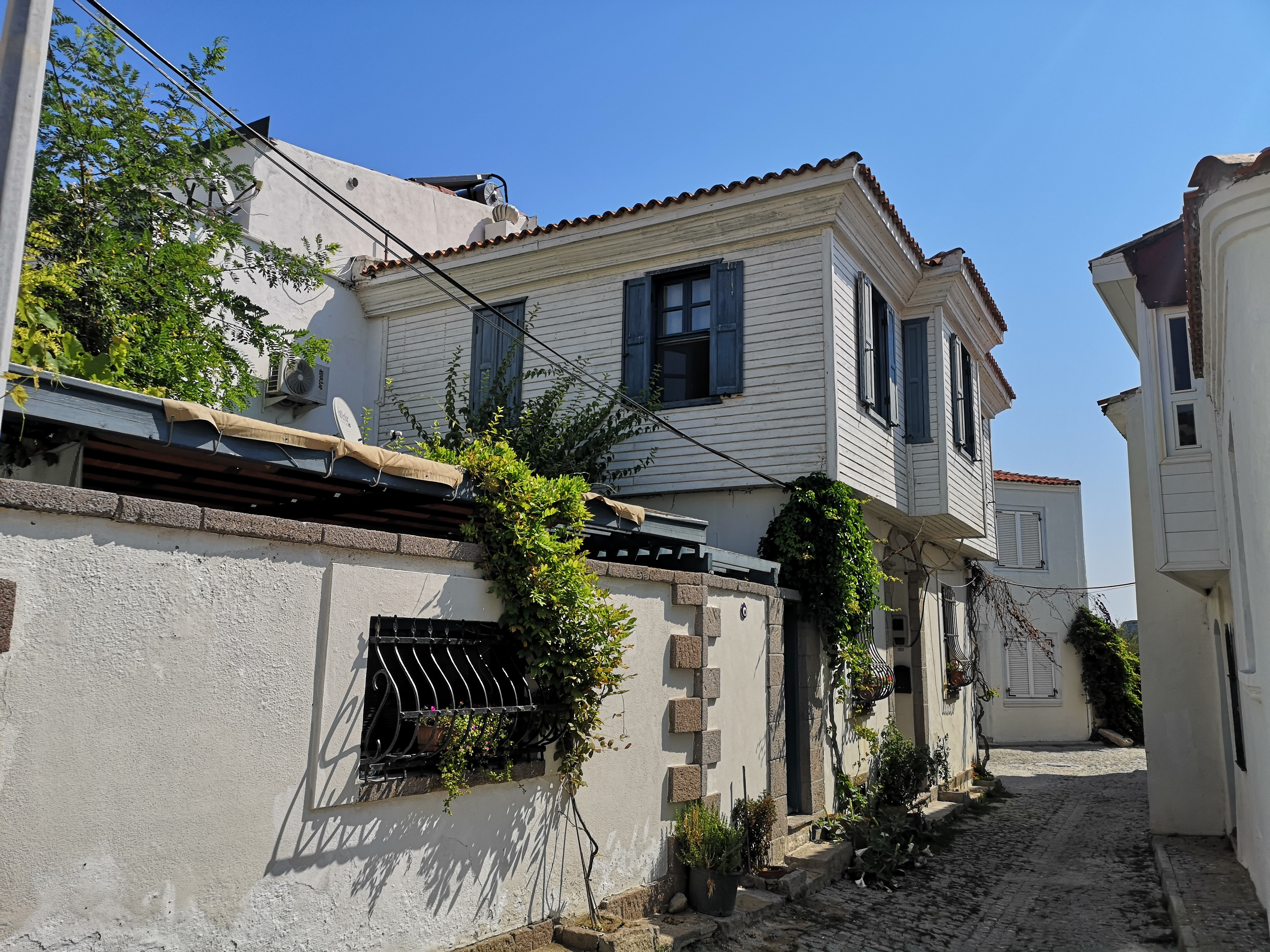
Traditional houses in Bozcaada

Bozcaada district covers the Bozcaada island and a total of 17 islets around the main island in the Aegean Sea. The total area of the district (including the islets) is 36.7 square kilometres (14.2 sq mi). The highest point of the district is Göztepe with an altitude of 192 metres (630 ft). The district center is situated on the east side of the island at about 39°50′N 26°04′E. It is situated 22 km. (12 Nautical miles) south of Dardanelles Strait (Çanakkale Boğazı) Its distance to Geyikli the nearest sea port on the main land (Anatolia) is 7.5 km ( 4.5 nautical miles). The distance from Geyikli to Çanakkale (province center) is about 40 kilometres (25 mi). Up until recently, Bozcaada was unique in Turkey as being a district with no rural population. (Because of metropolitan municipalities established after the 1980s there are now some other districts with no rural population.)

=== Climate ===
Bozcaada has a Mediterranean climate (Köppen: Csa) with warm, dry summers, nevertheless with high humidity; and mild, rainy winters.

Climate data for Bozcaada (1991–2020)
Month	Jan	Feb	Mar	Apr	May	Jun	Jul	Aug	Sep	Oct	Nov	Dec	Year
Mean daily maximum °C (°F)	10.9 (51.6)	11.5 (52.7)	13.5 (56.3)	17.1 (62.8)	21.6 (70.9)	25.6 (78.1)	27.1 (80.8)	27.2 (81.0)	24.5 (76.1)	20.3 (68.5)	16.1 (61.0)	12.3 (54.1)	19.0 (66.2)
Daily mean °C (°F)	8.4 (47.1)	8.8 (47.8)	10.6 (51.1)	13.7 (56.7)	17.9 (64.2)	21.8 (71.2)	23.5 (74.3)	23.8 (74.8)	21.2 (70.2)	17.5 (63.5)	13.5 (56.3)	10.0 (50.0)	15.9 (60.6)
Mean daily minimum °C (°F)	6.1 (43.0)	6.4 (43.5)	7.9 (46.2)	10.8 (51.4)	14.8 (58.6)	18.5 (65.3)	20.4 (68.7)	20.9 (69.6)	18.4 (65.1)	15.0 (59.0)	11.2 (52.2)	7.8 (46.0)	13.2 (55.8)
Average precipitation mm (inches)	66.0 (2.60)	64.74 (2.55)	58.89 (2.32)	42.45 (1.67)	20.15 (0.79)	12.86 (0.51)	3.99 (0.16)	6.57 (0.26)	20.61 (0.81)	45.66 (1.80)	63.92 (2.52)	91.36 (3.60)	497.2 (19.57)
Average precipitation days (≥ 1.0 mm)	6.4	7.0	5.7	5.2	3.1	2.0	1.2	1.6	2.9	4.2	6.1	8.4	53.8
Average relative humidity (%)	78.3	76.7	74.8	74.0	73.6	72.3	72.5	73.0	73.3	77.2	78.1	78.7	75.2
Source: NOAA

== Population ==
Historical population
Year	Pop.	±% p.a.
1985	2,030	—
1990	1,903	−1.28%
1997	2,549	+4.26%
2007	2,276	−1.13%
2012	2,465	+1.61%
2017	2,730	+2.06%
2022	3,120	+2.71%
Source: Population censuses (1985-1997) and TÜIK (2007-2022)

== History ==
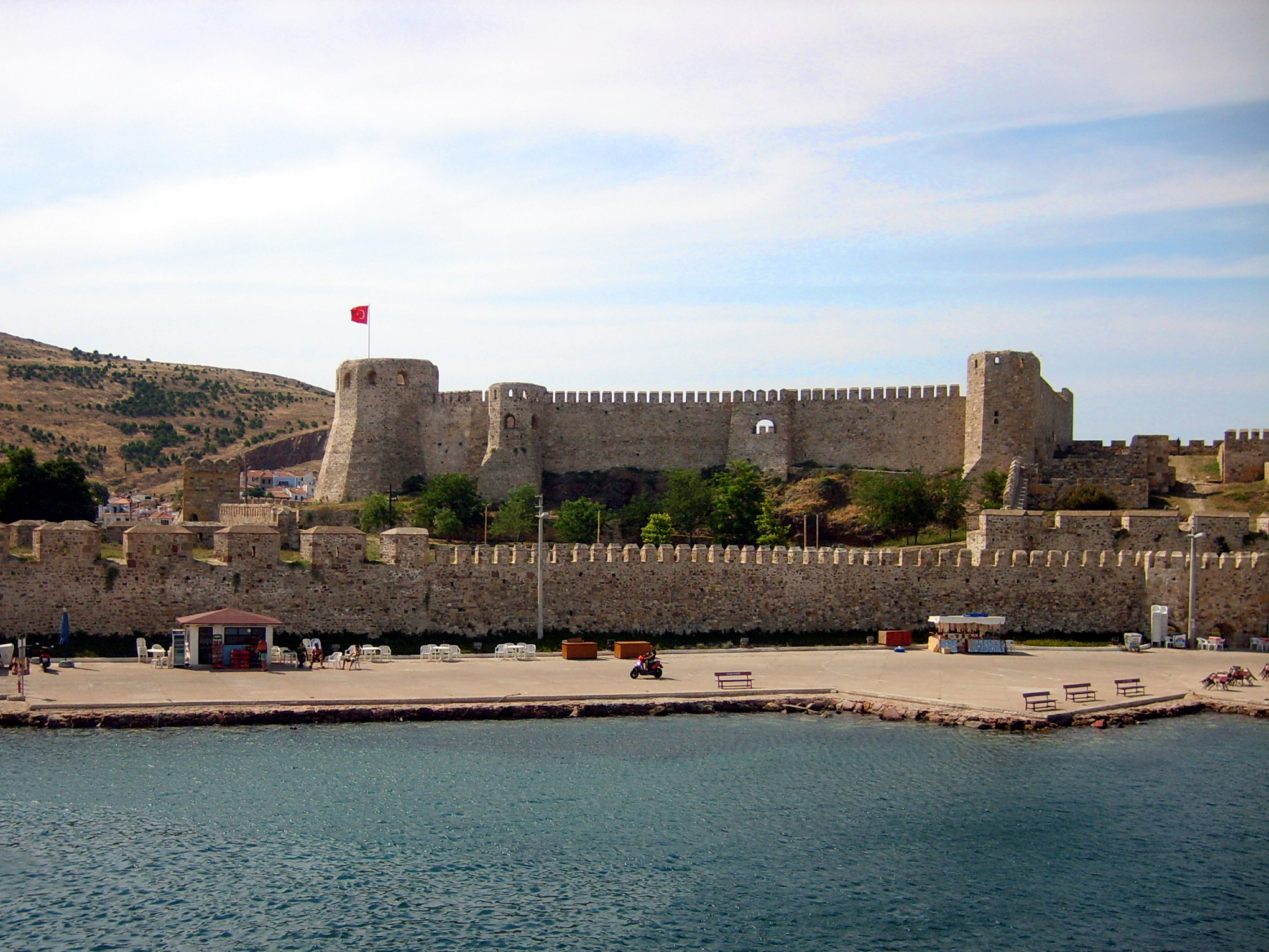
Bozcaada Castle

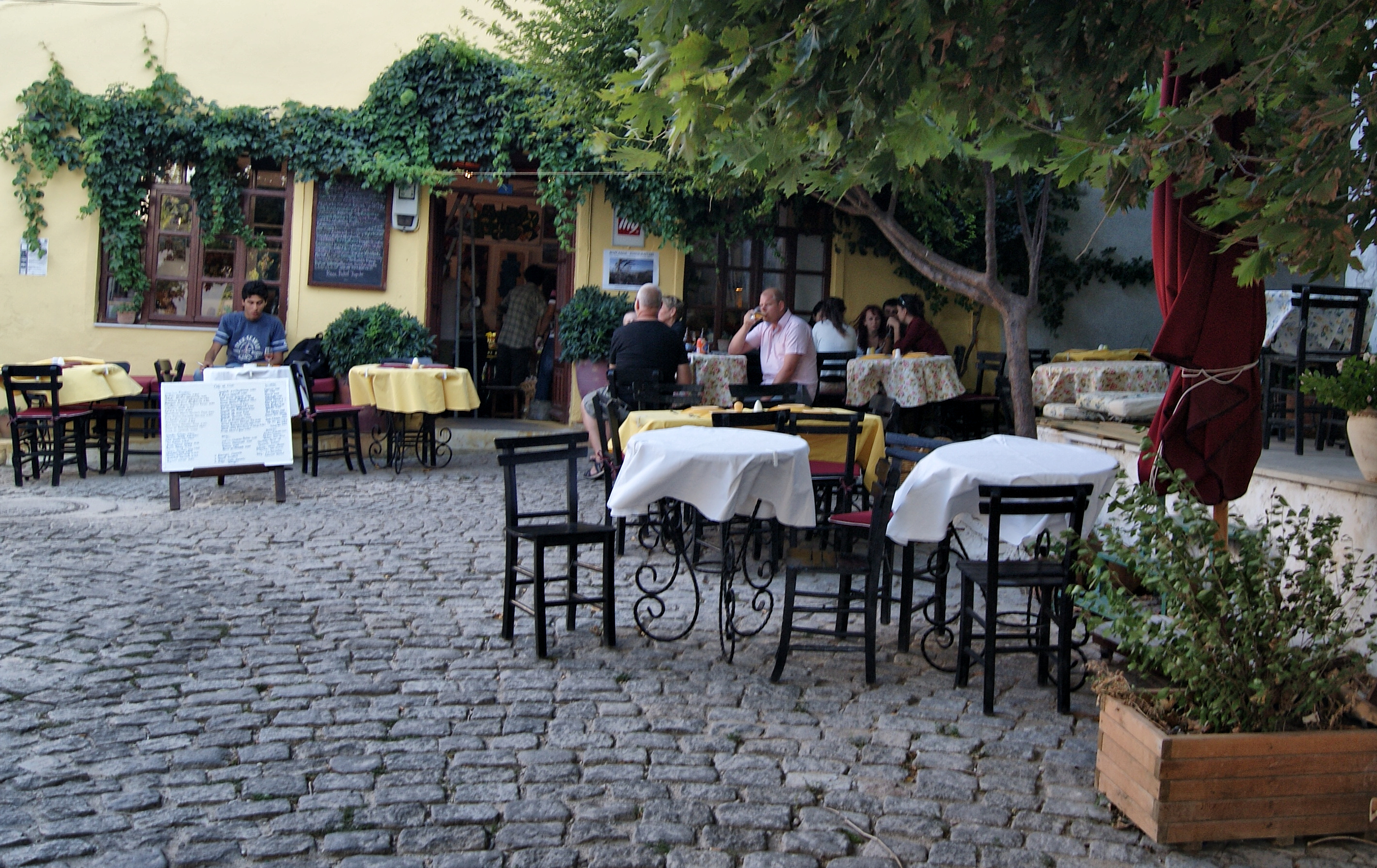
A restaurant in Bozcaada, which is famous for its local varieties of wine.

In the antiquity the island was known as Leukophrys and in Greek mythology it was Tenedos. It was mentioned in Homer's Iliad. In the medieval age it was a Byzantine possession. Towards the end of the medieval age it was left to Republic of Venice by the emperor John V Palaiologos as a ransom. In 1381 however, following Venetian Genoese War it was evacuated by the Venetians according to the Peace of Turin. In 1455 it was annexed by the Ottoman Empire during the reign of Mehmet II. Although the Venetians tried to regain the island, in 1464 the Ottoman control was secured by Mahmut Pasha. As a result of the former evacuation, the island was uninhabited during the early years of Ottoman administration and the Ottoman Empire populated the present Bozcaada district by using tax exemption. Ottoman Empire also restored the castle which was demolished during the Venetian-Genoese war. Turks called the island Bozcaada meaning grayish island and the famous cartographer Piri Reis of the 16th century also used this name in his maps. In 1923 when the Turkish Republic was proclaimed, the island was declared a district and the only settlement in Bozcaada became the municipality and district center of Çanakkale Province.

== Economy ==
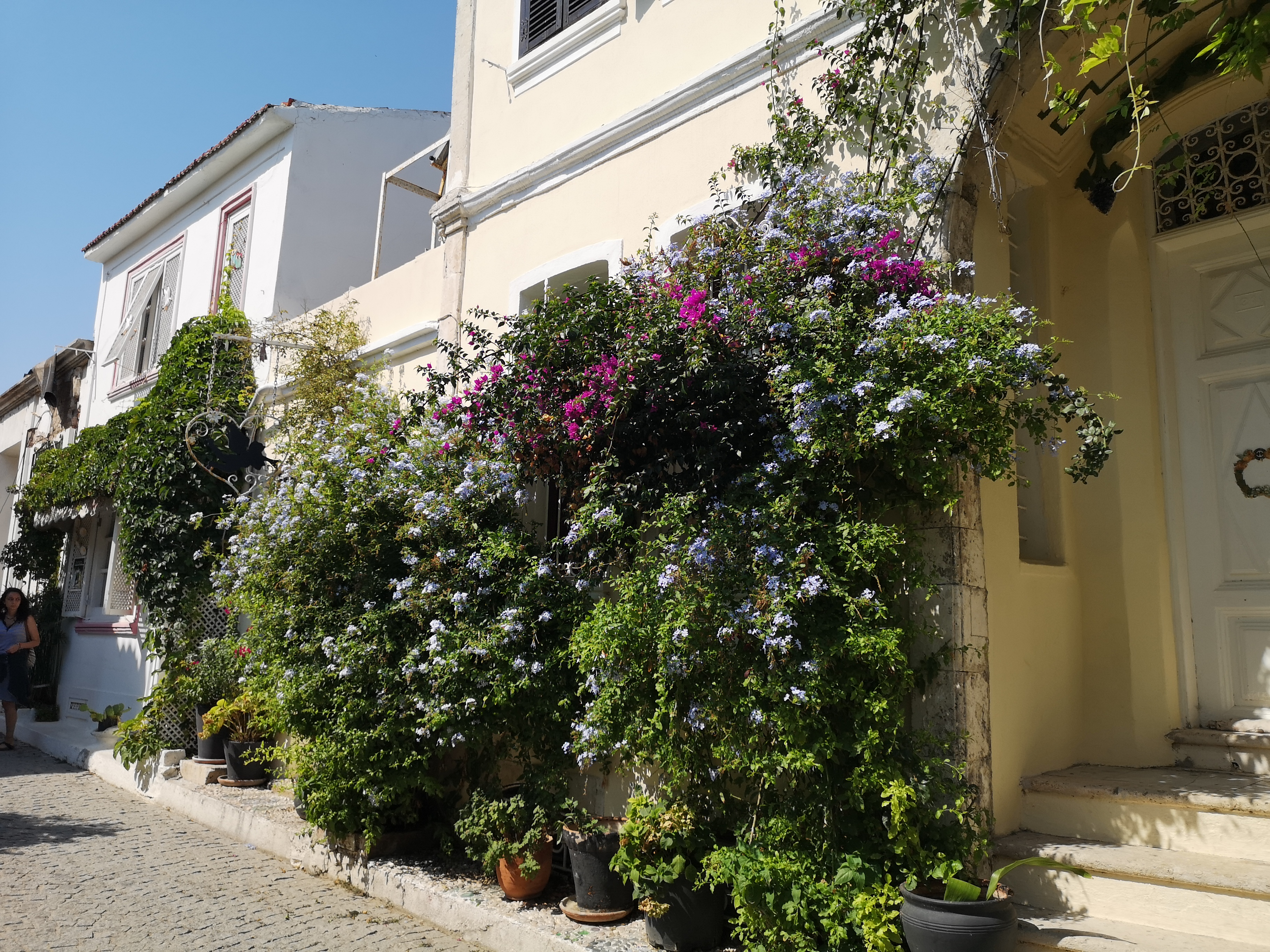
A street in Bozcaada

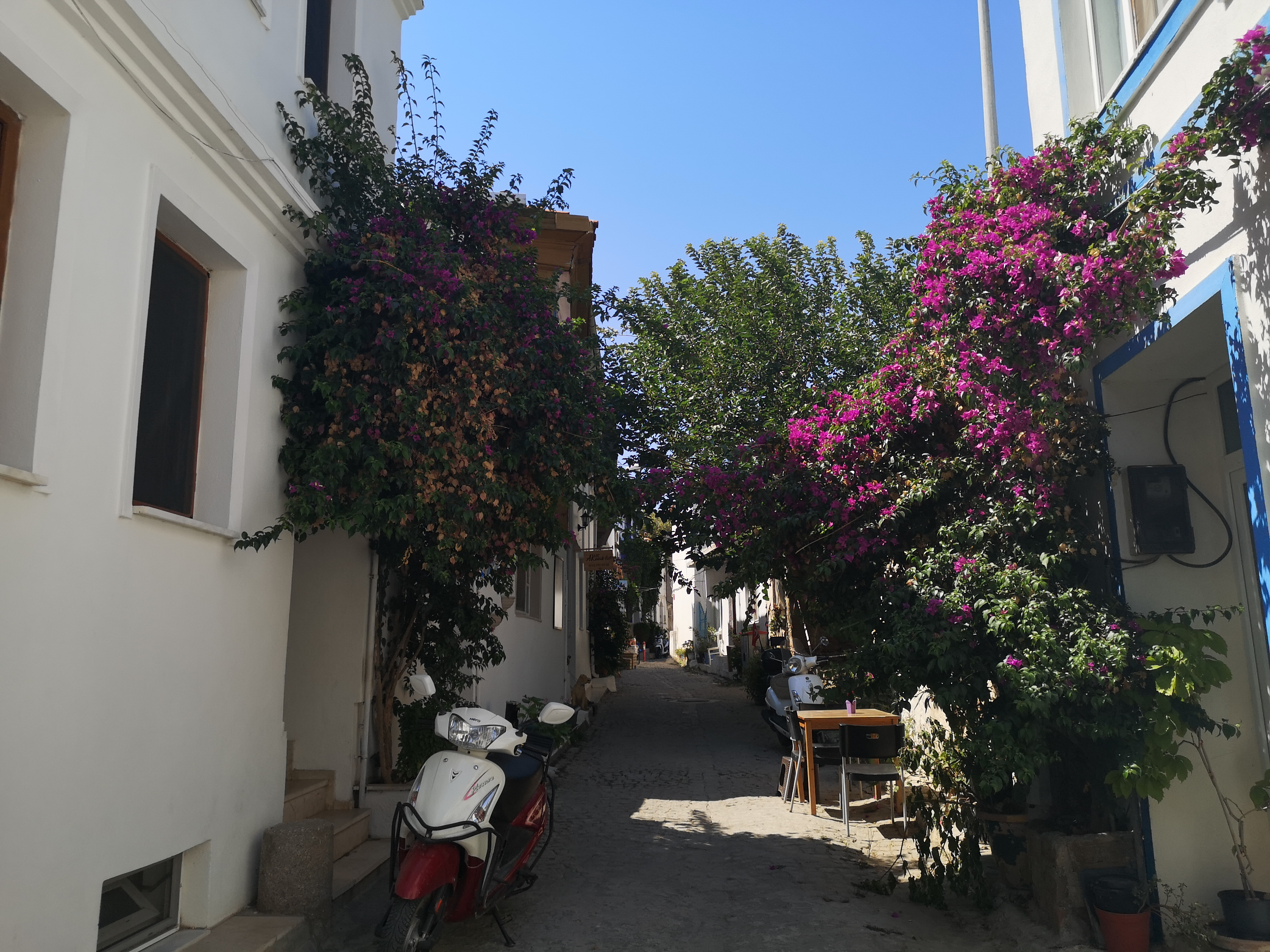
A street in Bozcaada

The major economic activities of Bozcaada are tourism, wineries, and fishing, with tourism as the dominant economic sector. More than 1.5 million tourists visited Bozccaada in 2018, driven in part by an increased presence in the global media.

== Places of interest ==
According to municipality of Bozcaada the historically important buildings are the following

- Bozcaada Castle which was reconstructed by the Ottoman sultan Mehmet II in the 15th century, and repaired by the Ottoman sultan Mahmut II in 1815 is the most important touristic attraction of Bozcaada. It is in the district center facing east. Thus visitors to Bozcaada can observe the castle during their voyage.
- Another castle is a casemate which is popularly called Yenikale ("new castle"). Despite its name it is in ruins. It was constructed in 1827 by Hafız Ali Pasha, the governor of Bozcaada. It is situated on a hill to the west of Bozacaada district center
- Alaybey mosque was probably built in 1700 by Ahmet Ağa, the governor of Bozcaada. It is partially in ruins.
- Yalı camii is a mosque which was built on the foundations of a medieval Venetian building in 1655. It was commissioned by Köprülü Mehmet Pasha (future grand vizier) in 1655. It is now under restoration.
- Namazgah fountain (with cistern) was built in 1703.
- Kimisis Teodoku (St Mary) church was built in 1869.
- The monastery of Aya Paraskevi

== Sister cities ==
- Valu lui Traian, Romania
- Gols, Austria
