= Gökçebayır, Ezine =

Village in Turkey

Gökçebayır
- Village
- Country: Turkey
- Province: Çanakkale
- District: Ezine
- Population (2021): 688
- Time zone: UTC+3 (TRT)

Gökçebayır is a village in the Ezine District of Çanakkale Province in Turkey. Its population is 688 (2021).
