= Çarıksız, Ezine =

Village in Turkey

Çarıksız
- Village
- Location in Turkey Çarıksız (Marmara)
- Coordinates: 39.7230°N 26.3875°E
- Country: Turkey
- Province: Çanakkale
- District: Ezine
- Population (2021): 89
- Time zone: UTC+3 (TRT)

Çarıksız is a village in the Ezine District of Çanakkale Province in Turkey. Its population is 89 (2021).
