= Yaylacık, Ezine =

Village in Turkey

Yaylacık
- Village
- Location in Turkey Yaylacık (Marmara)
- Coordinates: 39°40′55″N 26°16′49″E
- Country: Turkey
- Province: Çanakkale
- District: Ezine
- Population (2021): 145
- Time zone: UTC+3 (TRT)

Yaylacık is a village in the Ezine District of Çanakkale Province in Turkey. Its population is 145 (2021).
