= Mecidiye, Ezine =

Village in Turkey

Mecidiye
- Village
- Country: Turkey
- Province: Çanakkale
- District: Ezine
- Population (2021): 224
- Time zone: UTC+3 (TRT)

Mecidiye is a village in the Ezine District of Çanakkale Province in Turkey. Its population is 224 (2021).
