= Akköy, Ezine =

Village in Turkey

Akköy
- Village
- Location in Turkey Akköy (Marmara)
- Coordinates: 39.8248°N 26.3728°E
- Country: Turkey
- Province: Çanakkale
- District: Ezine
- Population (2021): 290
- Time zone: UTC+3 (TRT)

Akköy is a village in the Ezine District of Çanakkale Province in Turkey. Its population is 290 (2021).
