= Balıklı, Ezine =

Village in Turkey

Balıklı
- Village
- Location within Turkey Location within Marmara
- Coordinates: 39.7678°N 26.3752°E
- Country: Turkey
- Province: Çanakkale
- District: Ezine
- Population (2021): 142
- Time zone: UTC+3 (TRT)

Balıklı is a village in the Ezine District of Çanakkale Province in Turkey. Its population is 142 (2021).
