= Üsküfçü, Ezine =

Village in Turkey

Üsküfçü
- Village
- Location in Turkey Üsküfçü (Marmara)
- Coordinates: 39°44′N 26°18′E
- Country: Turkey
- Province: Çanakkale
- District: Ezine
- Population (2021): 61
- Time zone: UTC+3 (TRT)

Üsküfçü is a village in the Ezine District of Çanakkale Province in Turkey. Its population is 61 (2021).
