= Kumburun, Ezine =

Village in Turkey

Kumburun
- Village
- Location in Turkey Kumburun (Marmara)
- Coordinates: 39°52′N 26°10′E
- Country: Turkey
- Province: Çanakkale
- District: Ezine
- Population (2021): 423
- Time zone: UTC+3 (TRT)

Kumburun is a village in the Ezine District of Çanakkale Province in Turkey. Its population is 423 (2021).
