= Arasanlı, Ezine =

Village in Turkey

Arasanlı
- Village
- Location in Turkey Arasanlı (Marmara)
- Coordinates: 39°40′N 26°20′E
- Country: Turkey
- Province: Çanakkale
- District: Ezine
- Population (2021): 81
- Time zone: UTC+3 (TRT)

Arasanlı is a village in the Ezine District of Çanakkale Province in Turkey. Its population is 81 (2021).
