= Ezine, Çanakkale =

Coordinates: 39°47′24″N 26°19′57″E

Ezine
- Municipality
- Location in Turkey Ezine (Marmara)
- Coordinates
- Country: Turkey
- Province: Çanakkale
- District: Ezine

Government
  - Mayor: Güray Yüksel (AKP)
- Elevation: 50 m (160 ft)
- Population (2023): 32,000
- Time zone: UTC+3 (TRT)
- Area code: 0286
- Website: www.ezine.bel.tr

Ezine is a town in Çanakkale Province in the Marmara Region of Turkey. It is the seat of Ezine District. Its population is 15,408 (2021). The town lies at an elevation of 32 m (105 ft). Ezine is famous for its white cheese, made with cow, goat or sheep milk and called Ezine Peyniri.
