= Bozeli, Ezine =

Village in Turkey

Bozeli
- Village
- Location in Turkey Bozeli (Marmara)
- Coordinates: 39°41′N 26°22′E
- Country: Turkey
- Province: Çanakkale
- District: Ezine
- Population (2021): 108
- Time zone: UTC+3 (TRT)

Bozeli is a village in the Ezine District of Çanakkale Province in Turkey. Its population is 108 (2021).
