= Pazarköy, Ezine =

Village in Turkey

Pazarköy
- Village
- Location within Turkey Location within Marmara
- Coordinates: 39°48′22″N 26°25′15″E
- Country: Turkey
- Province: Çanakkale
- District: Ezine
- Population (2021): 232
- Time zone: UTC+3 (TRT)

Pazarköy is a village in the Ezine District of Çanakkale Province, Turkey. Its population is 232 (2021).
