= Bozcaada Castle =

Fort on the island of Bozcaada, Turkey

- Çanakkale Province, Turkey
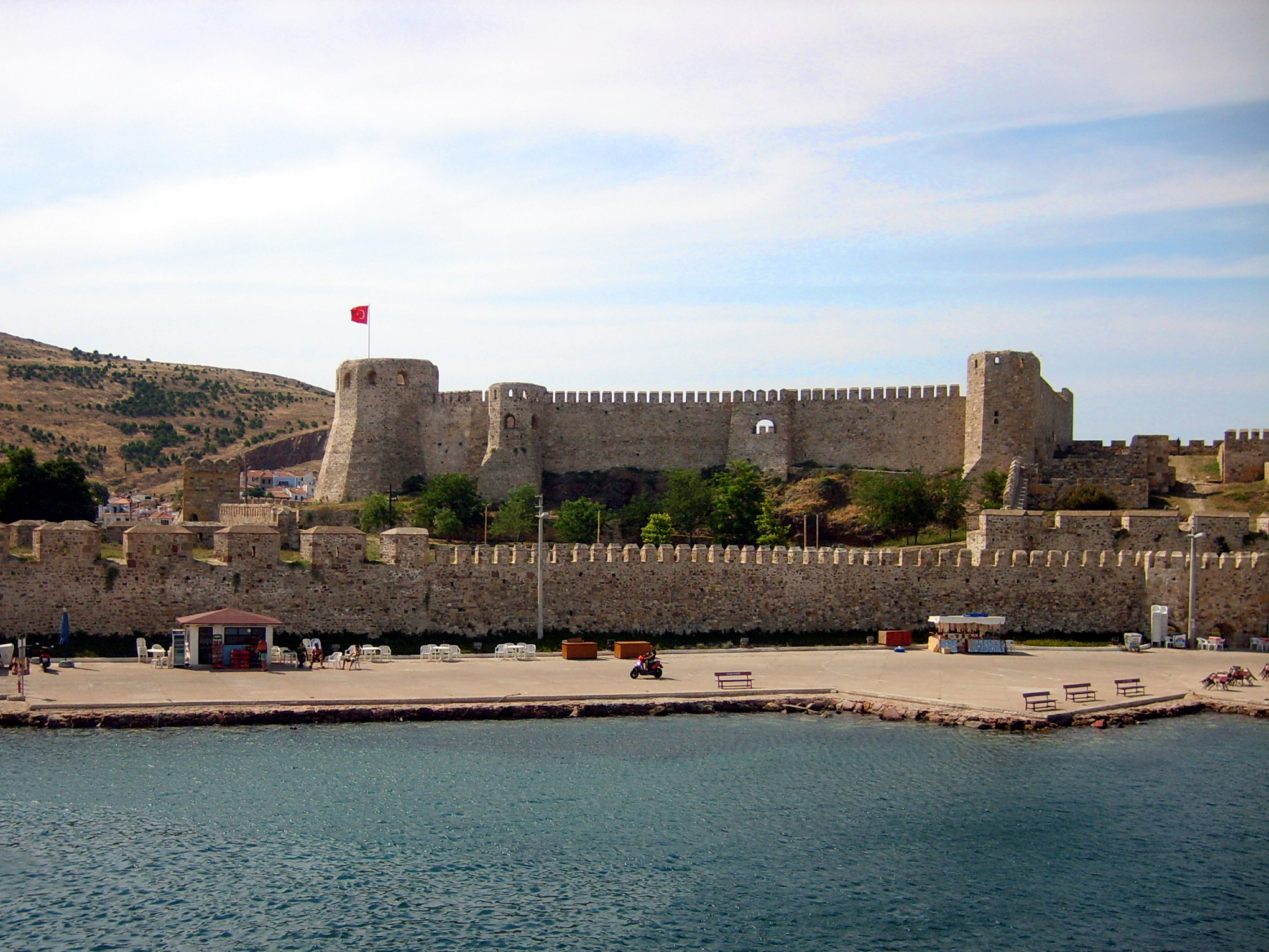
- From the east

Site information
- Type: Fortress
- Open to the public: Yes
- Condition: Most of it still standing.

Location
- Coordinates: 39°50′N 26°04′E

Site history
- Built by: Ottoman Empire

Bozcaada Castle (Turkish: Bozcaada kalesi) is a castle in the Turkish island of Bozcaada (known as Tenedos before the 15th century).

== Geography ==
The castle is in the northeast of the island, just north of the Bozcaada town at 39°50′N 26°04′E in Çanakkale Province. Visitors to the castle use the ferry line from Geyikli in the mainland (Anatolia) to the island. The castle is within walking distance from the ferry terminal.

== History ==
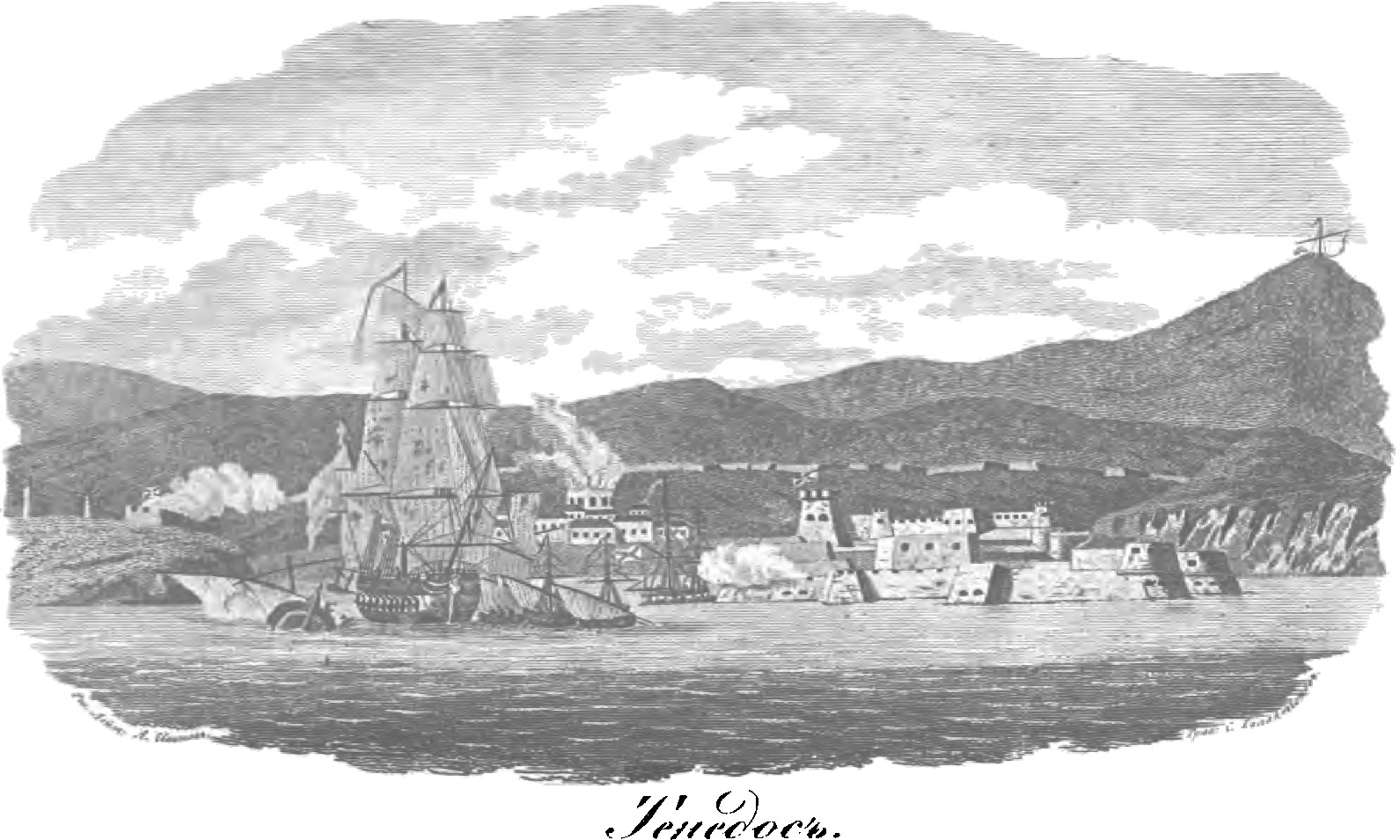
A Russian squadron of Admiral Senyavin of the Second Archipelago Expedition in 1807, occupy the island

There was a castle on the island before the 14th century, of undocumented construction and date: it was possibly built by the Phoenicians, Romans or Venetians. However, the castle was demolished after the War of Chioggia between Venice and Genoa on the advice of the Pope. When Mehmet II of the Ottoman Empire conquered the island in 1455 he rebuilt the castle. In July 1656, during the Cretan War, a Venice fleet commanded by Giacomo Loredano captured the castle. But Ottomans under Köprülü Mehmet Pasha recaptured the castle in August 1657. Soon after the reconquest, the castle underwent a great renewal. A second renewal was carried on in 1815 by the sultan Mahmut II.

== Architecture ==
There are two sections; bailey and the citadel. There is a moat of 250 metres (820 ft) length and 10 metres (33 ft) width to the south of the castle. Within the citadel there are cisterns, an arsenal, an infirmary, a well, a mosque and various rooms. Formally The gate of the castle was a saracen gate over the moat.
