= Bahçeli, Ezine =

Village in Turkey

Bahçeli
- Village
- Location in Turkey Bahçeli (Marmara)
- Coordinates: 39.6807°N 26.3833°E
- Country: Turkey
- Province: Çanakkale
- District: Ezine
- Population (2021): 236
- Time zone: UTC+3 (TRT)

Bahçeli is a village in the Ezine District of Çanakkale Province in Turkey. Its population is 236 (2021).
