= Belen, Ezine =

Village in Turkey

Belen
- Village
- Location in Turkey Belen (Marmara)
- Coordinates: 39.6726°N 26.2314°E
- Country: Turkey
- Province: Çanakkale
- District: Ezine
- Population (2021): 189
- Time zone: UTC+3 (TRT)

Belen is a village in the Ezine District of Çanakkale Province in Turkey. Its population is 189 (2021).
