= Dalyan, Ezine =

Village in Turkey

Dalyan
- Village
- Country: Turkey
- Province: Çanakkale
- District: Ezine
- Population (2021): 540
- Time zone: UTC+3 (TRT)

Dalyan is a village in the Ezine District of Çanakkale Province in Turkey. Its population is 540 (2021).
