= Aladağ, Ezine =

Village in Turkey

Aladağ
- Village
- Location in Turkey Aladağ (Marmara)
- Coordinates: 39.7692°N 26.2699°E
- Country: Turkey
- Province: Çanakkale
- District: Ezine
- Population (2021): 150
- Time zone: UTC+3 (TRT)

Aladağ is a village in the Ezine District of Çanakkale Province in Turkey. Its population is 150 (2021).
