= Mahmudiye, Ezine =

Village in Turkey

Mahmudiye
- Village
- Location in Turkey Mahmudiye (Marmara)
- Coordinates: 39°52′29″N 26°14′22″E
- Country: Turkey
- Province: Çanakkale
- District: Ezine
- Population (2021): 1,253
- Time zone: UTC+3 (TRT)

Mahmudiye is a village in the Ezine District of Çanakkale Province in Turkey. Its population is 1,253 (2021). Before the 2013 reorganisation, it was a town (belde).
