= Köseler, Ezine =

Village in Turkey

Köseler
- Village
- Location in Turkey Köseler (Marmara)
- Coordinates: 39°40′25″N 26°16′16″E
- Country: Turkey
- Province: Çanakkale
- District: Ezine
- Population (2021): 140
- Time zone: UTC+3 (TRT)

Köseler is a village in the Ezine District of Çanakkale Province in Turkey. Its population is 140 (2021).
