= Karadağ, Ezine =

Village in Turkey

Karadağ
- Village
- Location in Turkey Karadağ (Marmara)
- Coordinates: 39°48′26″N 26°16′50″E
- Country: Turkey
- Province: Çanakkale
- District: Ezine
- Population (2021): 132
- Time zone: UTC+3 (TRT)

Karadağ is a village in the Ezine District of Çanakkale Province in Turkey. Its population is 132 (2021).
