= Tavaklı, Ezine =

Village in Turkey

Tavaklı
- Village
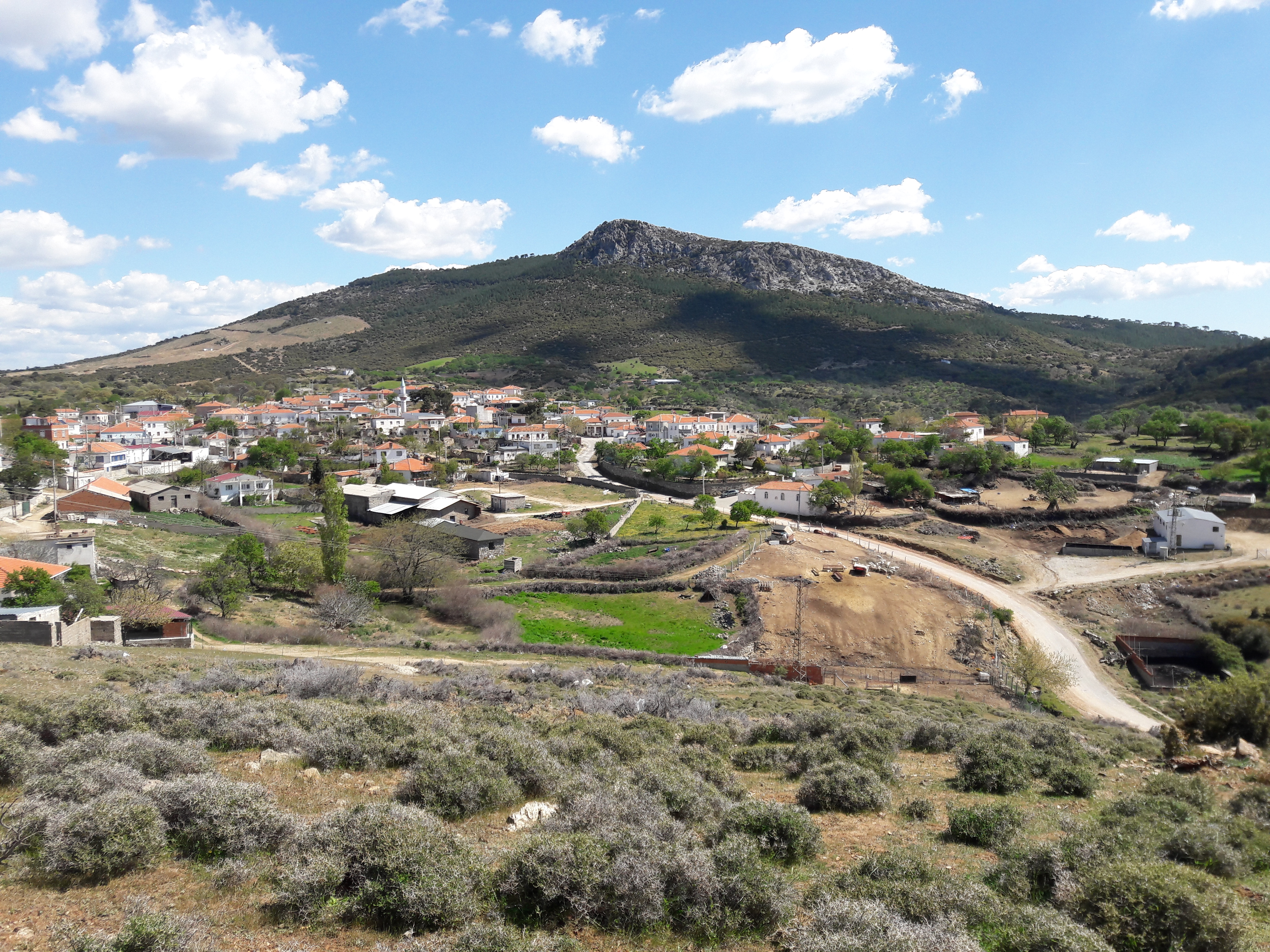

- Location within Turkey Location within Marmara
- Coordinates: 39°40′N 26°12′E
- Country: Turkey
- Province: Çanakkale
- District: Ezine
- Population (2021): 571
- Time zone: UTC+3 (TRT)

Tavaklı is a village in the Ezine District of Çanakkale Province in Turkey. Its population is 571 (2021).
