= Üvecik, Ezine =

Village in Turkey

Üvecik
- Village
- Country: Turkey
- Province: Çanakkale
- District: Ezine
- Population (2021): 510
- Time zone: UTC+3 (TRT)

Üvecik is a village in the Ezine District of Çanakkale Province in Turkey. Its population is 510 (2021).
