= Bozalan, Ezine =

Village in Turkey

Bozalan
- Village
- Location in Turkey Bozalan (Marmara)
- Coordinates: 39.8549°N 26.2543°E
- Country: Turkey
- Province: Çanakkale
- District: Ezine
- Population (2021): 226
- Time zone: UTC+3 (TRT)

Bozalan is a village in the Ezine District of Çanakkale Province in Turkey. Its population is 226 (2021).
