= Körüktaşı, Ezine =

Village in Turkey

Körüktaşı
- Village
- Location in Turkey Körüktaşı (Marmara)
- Coordinates: 39°44′N 26°13′E
- Country: Turkey
- Province: Çanakkale
- District: Ezine
- Population (2021): 197
- Time zone: UTC+3 (TRT)

Körüktaşı is a village in the Ezine District of Çanakkale Province in Turkey. Its population is 197 (2021).
