= Çamlıca, Ezine =

Village in Turkey

Çamlıca
- Village
- Location in Turkey Çamlıca (Marmara)
- Coordinates: 39.8977°N 26.4369°E
- Country: Turkey
- Province: Çanakkale
- District: Ezine
- Population (2021): 180
- Time zone: UTC+3 (TRT)

Çamlıca is a village in the Ezine District of Çanakkale Province in Turkey. Its population is 180 (2021).
