= Akçakeçili, Ezine =

Village in Turkey

Akçakeçili
- Village
- Location in Turkey Akçakeçili (Marmara)
- Coordinates: 39°43′N 26°12′E
- Country: Turkey
- Province: Çanakkale
- District: Ezine
- Population (2021): 150
- Time zone: UTC+3 (TRT)

Akçakeçili is a village in the Ezine District of Çanakkale Province in Turkey. Its population is 150 (2021).
