= Çamoba, Ezine =

Village in Turkey

Çamoba
- Village
- Location in Turkey Çamoba (Marmara)
- Coordinates: 39.8397°N 26.1841°E
- Country: Turkey
- Province: Çanakkale
- District: Ezine
- Population (2021): 192
- Time zone: UTC+3 (TRT)

Çamoba is a village in the Ezine District of Çanakkale Province in Turkey. Its population is 192 (2021).
