= Geyikli =

Town in Turkey

- Municipality
- Location in Turkey Geyikli (Marmara)
- Coordinates: 39°48′N 26°13′E
- Country: Turkey
- Province: Çanakkale
- District: Ezine
- Elevation: 55 m (180 ft)
- Population (2021): 3,660
- Time zone: UTC+3 (TRT)
- Postal code: 17610
- Area code: 0286

Geyikli is a town (belde) in the Ezine District, Çanakkale Province, Turkey. Its population is 3,660 (2021). Geyikli is one of the westernmost locations of Anatolia. It is situated opposite to Bozcaada island (Tenedos of the antiquity) and the departing point of ferryboats to Bozcaada is in Geyikli (in the coastal quarters of Geyikli, so called Geyikli İskelesi)
