= Devon Larratt =

Canadian professional armwrestler (born 1975)

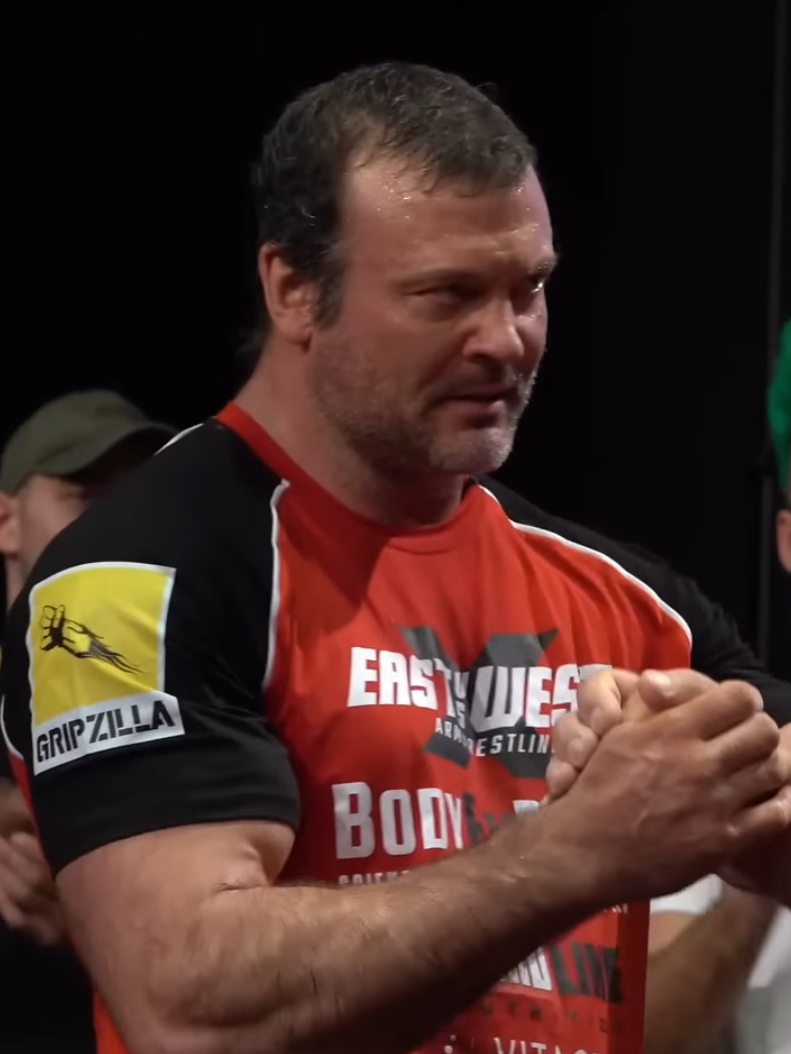
- Larratt in 2023

Personal information
- Nickname: No Limits
- Born: 24 April 1975 (age 51) Victoria, British Columbia, Canada
- Occupation: Arm wrestler
- Height: 196 cm (6 ft 5 in)
- Weight: 120 kg (265 lb)
- Website: armbet.net
- Military career
- Allegiance: Canada
- Branch: Princess of Wales' Own Regiment (Reserve); Princess Patricia’s Canadian Light Infantry; Royal Canadian Regiment; Joint Task Force 2
- Rank: Master corporal

Sport
- Country: Canada
- Sport: Arm wrestling

Devon Eberhard Larratt (born 24 April 1975) is a Canadian professional armwrestler, content creator, and a former member of the Canadian Armed Forces.

Larratt is considered to be one of the top arm wrestlers and as of the King Of The Table 7 event, the title holder of the best arm wrestler in North America. He has helped popularize the sport.

== Early life ==
Born in Victoria, British Columbia, Canada to a German mother, Devon learned to speak German as a child. His interest in arm wrestling began as an early teenager. Larratt's first opponent was his grandmother, a farmworker, who claimed to be "the best arm-wrestling woman in Alberta." From there, Larratt progressed to competing on the oil fields of western Canada. Larratt also competed in Judo during his youth.

== Military career ==
Larratt joined the Canadian Armed Forces as a reservist, in the Princess of Wales' Own Regiment (PWOR) at the age of 21. With PWOR he received high quality training, which inspired him to further his military career, since all his instructors were from the recently disbanded Canadian Airborne Regiment, tasked with training the new reserves. Later on, he transferred to the Princess Patricia’s Canadian Light Infantry (PPCLI) and with the regiment, he served a tour in Bosnia. In 1998, he put in a compassionate transfer to the Royal Canadian Regiment (RCR), to be closer to his father who had cancer. The transfer was approved and while at the unit, Devon started focusing on getting ready for Joint Task Force 2 (JTF2) selection, taking part in numerous athletic opportunities, from ironman competitions, basketball, to tug of war.

He was selected for training on his second try and started his service with Joint Task Force 2 on 9/11. He served in the unit for sixteen years and six months before retiring in 2016. He achieved the rank of master corporal, and was deployed seven times to Afghanistan, where he was wounded in action. Despite his deployments, Larratt managed to train and compete during his military service, and credits the experience gained at different military bases as a large part of his success.

== Early career ==
In 1999, Larratt won the Ontario Provincial Championships in left and right handed, Larratt also competed in the Canadian Nationals in left and right handed in the 100 kg competition winning both. Larratt entered his first international competition, competing at WAF Worlds event in Japan, where he defeated Krister Jonsson and lost to John Brzenk. Larratt placed third in the left handed and right handed 100 kg competition.

In 2000, Larratt won the Ontario Provincial Championships in the left and right handed in his category. Larratt placed first at the Canadian Nationals in right handed and second in left handed.

In 2001, Larratt won the Ontario Provincial Championship in the left and right handed and also won the Canadian Nationals in left handed and right handed.

In 2002, Larratt won the "All Niagara Armwrestling Championships" as right handed at 199+ lbs competition.

In 2003, Larratt won at the Ontario Provincial Championships in the right handed at 221+ lbs and also in the Central Ontario Championships Larratt defeated Robert Graham, Garth Carlson and Mike Gould.

In 2004, Devon Larratt once again dominated the Central Ontario Championships, but lost a super match in Chehalis, Washington against John Brzenk.

In 2005, Larratt defeated Tim Bresnan 3-0 in a supermatch, at Battle in the Capital II in Ottawa, Ontario.

In 2006, after returning from a six-month deployment, Larratt defeated Ron Bath 3–1, at a Mike Gould Classic event in Ontario, Canada. At the time Ron Bath was considered the #3 ranked heavy weight in North America, behind only John Brzenk and Travis Bagent. Devon Larratt has stated that this was his favorite match, "for a number of reasons", but mostly because of the difficulties and stressors of combat, and the uncertainty of returning to a "normal life". Larratt was shot, and took shrapnel to the hand while deployed to Afghanistan. Months later, Larratt faced the Ukrainian champion Taras Ivakin at Professional Armwrestling League (PAL) Vendetta/Armfight #26 and lost, 2–4.

== Career timeline ==
=== Arm Wars & Supermatches ===
In 2007, Devon Larratt joined Arm Wars, again defeating Ron Bath, this time with a score of 6–0 in the Arm Wars X event at the Trafford Centre in Manchester, England in the right and left arm.

In 2008, Larratt faced Travis Bagent in Arm Wars XI in a right hand match, winning 5-1, although he lost 1-5 in the left hand match. Later that year Larratt was the first man in twenty five years to beat John Brzenk in a super-match at Arm Wars "Deep Water", on 13 September. After defeating that arm-wrestling legend, 6–0, Larratt became an internationally recognized armwrestler, and was considered the new #1 ranked right handed arm-wrestler in the world. Later Devon beat Johan Lindholm 6-0 in the same day in the right arm. In the same event, Larratt also beat Michael Todd 6-0 and Marcio Barboza 5-1 in the left hand to both.

In 2009, Devon Larratt beat super-heavyweight Dave Randall in a supermatch 2-0, at Northeast Armwrestling Challenge VII (NEAC VII).

In 2010, Devon Larratt beat Travis Bagent 4–3, Tim Bresnan 5–1, and Don Underwood 4–3, to become the #1 ranked arm-wrestler in the world (both left and right).

In 2010, Devon Larratt defeated former Arnold Classic champion and number one contender, Don Underwood, to retain the right-hand title.

In 2011, Devon Larratt beat "Monster" Michael Todd and Christophe Ladu. Devon Larratt lost his left-hand title to Travis Bagent at UAL Backyard Brawl, but beat Bagent 3-0 for the right hand title at the same event.

=== UAL/MLA/PAL Armfight ===
In 2012, after Arm Wars went into abeyance, Devon Larratt participated in UAL/MLA and PAL Armfight tournaments, where he defeated Tim Bresnan for the Major League Armwrestling (MLA) in the Toronto Pro Super Show for right hand super heavy weight title in Ontario, Canada. In the same year, Larratt defeated Andriy Pushkar at Professional Armwrestling League (PAL) Armfight #42, winning 5–1 to win the left hand world title.

In 2013, Larratt beat Oleh Zhokh, Wilton Brock, and Eric Woelfel at Ultimate Armwrestling League 4 (UAL 4) to retain his left hand heavyweight title. He then underwent surgery on both elbows. As a result of the injury, Larratt lost his number one pound-for-pound ranking. He underwent a similar procedure on his left elbow in 2016, but was able to recover much faster, returning to win the WAL championship in the same year.

=== WAL & Supermatches ===
After recovering from elbow surgery, Devon Larratt joined the World Armwrestling League (WAL) in 2014. His first WAL event took place in January 2015, where he won the left-handed title, defeating Marcio Barboza, 2–0. At the same event, Larratt lost the right-handed title to Marcio Barboza 0–2.

Later in 2015, Larratt defeated Ron Bath left handed and right handed at WAL Southern Regionals. Larratt won the WAL Championships left-hand heavyweight title after Marcio Barboza withdrew (injury). In the right handed semi-finals, Larratt lost to American arm-wrestling legend John Brzenk. While Larratt won the first match in the straps, Brzenk displayed superior hand control and dominated the next two matches outside of the straps to win 2–1.

In 2016, Larratt defeated Matt Mask left handed and right handed at WAL Northern Regionals. Larratt returned to peak form, successfully defending his left-hand title against Matt Mask and winning the WAL right-hand title against top contenders Marcio Barboza and Ron Bath.

In 2017, Larratt retained the WAL right-hand and left-hand heavyweight titles by defeating perennial rival Matt Mask. Larratt also defended his right-hand legacy hammer against a challenge from "Big Frank" Budelewski at Buffalo Fitness Expo 2017, the event also had a charitable aspect to it, and left hand hammer against Zhao Zi Rui of China at the Super Armwrestling League (SAL) in a supermatch.

On 17 May 2018, at WAL 402, Larratt defeated American super heavyweight "Big Daddy" Jerry Cadorette, 3–2, in a right handed supermatch. At WAL 405, Larratt defeated Matt Mask 3–1. At WAL 406, Larratt lost the right-hand championship to Michael Todd. Later that year, during Armfight #50, Larratt lost a left handed super match against Russian wrestling armwrestler Denis Cyplenkov, in which Cyplenkov won 6–0. After the match, Larratt said Cyplenkov was most likely "25 to 30% stronger". Larratt subsequently rededicated himself to strength training. After these matches, Larratt sent the right handed legacy hammer to Michael Todd and the left handed legacy hammer to Denis Cyplenkov.

On 23 May 2019, at WAL 501, Devon Larratt beat Todd Hutchings 3–0. Hutchings, who typically competes in lower weight classes, performed admirably. In July 2019, at WAL 504, Larratt beat Dave Chaffee 3–1, displaying an impressive king's move and much improved strength. Later that year, at WAL 506, Larratt beat Brazilian champion Wagner Bortolato left-handed 3–1. Devon Larratt also beat the Australian champion Ryan Scott 3–0 in a AAF (Australian Armwrestling Federation) supermatch at the Arnold Classic on 26 March 2019.

In March 2021, at BAL 204, Larratt defeated Janek Kwias in a supermatch.

=== King of the Table ===
On 28 May 2021, less than five months after recovering from deep vein thrombosis, Devon Larratt agreed to meet Michael Todd at King of the Table (KOTT) in Dubai for the right-hand heavyweight title. In one of the most hyped matches of all time, Larratt avenged his 2018 loss in dramatic fashion by defeating number one ranked Michael Todd 6–0. After the match, Michael Todd stated that the 2021 version of Devon Larratt was the "strongest arm-wrestler he ever faced". Ryan "Blue" Bowen, currently ranked #3 in Australia, speculated that the 2021 version of Larratt may be the "strongest arm-wrestler the world has ever seen", noting that no arm-wrestler has ever defeated Michael Todd "so significantly".

On 11 December 2021, at King of the Table II, Devon Larratt beat John Brzenk 4-0 for the right-hand heavy weight title. Larratt was impressive throughout the match, controlling the hand and wrist of John Brzenk in three of the four rounds; when Brzenk did manage to take the hand and wrist in round 1, Larratt was able to stop the drive and make the necessary tactical adjustments. Larratt weighed in at 129.5 kilos, or 285.5 pounds.

=== Legacy Hammer ===
The Legacy Hammer, which was presented to Devon Larratt after he defeated Michael Todd at KOTT 1, has since been passed to Levan Saginashvili, who defeated him at KOTT 4. The hammer, although created by the WAL exclusively for its champions, is a symbolic representation of the world's best armwrestler, and the wielder of the legacy hammer must ensure that the hammer belongs to the person most worthy. Current hammer holders as of 21 November 2024 are Levan Saginashvili (right hand) and Artyom Morozov (left hand).

=== Exhibition boxing ===
On 16 August 2021, Devon Larratt accepted a boxing match with the World's Strongest Man Champion Hafþór Júlíus Björnsson. Larratt, who had no previous boxing experience, trained for the match at Tristar Gym, owned by Firas Zahabi. The gym is notable for training a number of top mixed martial artists, including UFC Hall of Famer Georges St-Pierre. When asked why he accepted the match on short notice, Devon stated that he "knows a lot about the sport of arm-wrestling", and that "abandoning his area of expertise" to enter a "fighter dorm", with "professional fighters", is an "opportunity to grow as a human being".

The match took place in Dubai, on 18 September 2021, where Larratt lost to Hafþór by technical knockout. Larratt landed an early right hook on Hafþór, but Hafþór dominated the rest of the fight with superior foot work and a hard jab. With twenty five seconds remaining in the first round, Hafþór stunned Larratt with a left hook. While some criticized the referee for jumping in prematurely, Devon said it was "probably a good thing the referee stopped the fight".

=== Levan & East vs West Debut ===
On 18 December 2021, King of the Table announced that Devon Larratt will face Levan Saginashvili at King of the Table 4 (KOTT 4). The match took place in Dubai, on 25 June 2022. Levan Saginashvili is considered the #1 right handed armwrestler in the world today and the Strongest armwrestler in history. As a heavy underdog, Devon's only chances of winning the match would be to stop Levan's explosive drive, regrip, and drain the power from Levan's hands. During the match, any small hope Larratt had of winning would disappear with an early bicep injury and he would go on to lose 6–0.

Later that year, on 19 November, Devon Larratt would make his first appearance at an East vs West event, dropping one weight class, and facing the then Heavyweight Champion of East vs West, Evgeny Prudnik. Devon participated in this match because Prudnik's originally scheduled opponent (Michael Todd) had to withdraw due to injury. Devon won the match, besting Prudnik to a score of 3-0 and gaining the Heavyweight Title of the event.

=== 2023 ===
In a pre-recorded Arm Wars Dark Card event that aired on 4 February, Devon Larratt faced Sandris Sedis twice, both in right and left handed matches. Devon won both, 6-0 and 4-2 respectively, retaining his Heavyweight title.

Larratt decided that he would return to the Super-Heavyweight class due to lack of competition among the Heavyweights. His first Super Heavyweight match of the year would be against the Georgian Genadi Kvikvinia on 6 May and after 5 rounds of struggling coming from both sides, Genadi came out on top, besting Devon 3-2.

Immediately after the Genadi match, Devon Larratt traveled to the UK for Arm Wars Dark Card 2. He participated in a 2 Round Supermatch Tournament on the left hand called Battleground, defeating Mindaugas Dulskas in the 1st round and then Daniel Lund Kristensen in the Championship, both by a score of 6-0. On 10 June, Larratt continued his left hand winning streak by defeating Bulgarian champion Yordan Tsonev at Be Strong Armwrestling 4.

On 24 June, Devon Larratt would have a match at King of the Table 7 against Dave Chaffee for the King of the North title, which is the title for best armwrestler in North America. Despite Devon having a bout with food poisoning just 2 days before the match, he would go on to win with a dominant 6-0 victory.

On 1 July, Larratt defeated Ryan Espey at the Canadian National Championships. However, the legitimacy of this match has been called into question by Espey because it was part of a tournament, Espey only had a few days notice that the match was taking place, and Larratt (who showed up to only compete against Espey) allegedly forfeited matches so that he could face Espey. The forfeited matches would have not only made Devon more rested than Espey for their match, but it would also allow Devon's opponents that got wins by forfeit to move on in the tournament without earning it.

On 12 August, Larratt defeated Sergey Kalinichenko in an exhibition supermatch.

On 26 August, Larratt would face the then reigning Super-Heavyweight East vs West champion, Ermes Gasparini, for the East vs West Super-Heavyweight Title. Larratt was originally scheduled to face Genadi Kvikvinia on this date in a rematch, but Genadi suffered a serious bicep injury while training. The supermatch against Gasparini would be the best of five rounds. The difference, however, is that both Devon and Ermes agreed that all five rounds would be pulled. An underdog in this bout, Devon would decisively defeat Gasparini 5 - 0 to become, at age 48, the oldest Super-Heavyweight champion in arm wrestling history. In the first round, Devon would win through fouls. Though, the second and third rounds were more decisive, with Larratt being able to pin Gasparini in both rounds. Gasparini eventually decided to not pull the 4th and 5th rounds due to being too tired.

On 30 August, Devon Larratt defeated Georgi Tsvetkov 6-0 in a long and hard fought left handed match at Arm Wars Dark Card 3.

On 11 November, in a highly anticipated rematch, Larratt defended his East vs West Super-Heavyweight Title against Denis Cyplenkov at East vs West 10, Denis said he would be around 85% - 90% of what he was at his prime. This match was considered by many to be "the biggest match in the history of the sport". Larratt won 5-0. Cyplenkov eventually decided to not pull the 4th and 5th rounds.

On 9 December, Devon Larratt would have another match against Georgi Tsvetkov, this time on the right hand. It was at King of the Table 9 for the Super-Heavyweight title. Devon won the match 6-0. Tsvetkov eventually decided to not pull the 6th round.

=== 2024 ===
Larratt would start the year competing on the left hand at the Arm Wars The Gathering II event in Las Vegas. On 5 January, in an exhibition supermatch leading up to the event, Larratt would defeat the 3rd-ranked American Super-Heavyweight Pavlo Derbedyenyev 3-1. At the official event on 8 January, Larratt would lose to Kamil Jablonski 5-1. It was Larratt’s first loss on the left hand since 2018.

On 20 April, Devon Larratt faced Levan Saginashvili in a rematch at East vs West 12, in a right handed best of 7 supermatch. Larratt would lose by a score of 4-0, passing on the East vs West Super-Heavyweight Title to Saginashvili.

Larratt would get his first official win of the year by defeating Chance Shaw 3-1 at East vs West 14 on 10 August. Larratt weighed in for the match at 105 kg (his lightest match weight in 8 years) due to a stipulation from the much heavier Shaw that both participants agreed to. The match was not without controversy as Shaw was accused of pushing Larratt's arm off of his pad twice, causing Larratt to foul both times and lose the 1st round. Also, Larratt approached Shaw's corner to trash talk after Round 2, which resulted in Larratt wrestling with one of Shaw's cornermen.

Devon Larratt then faced Leonidas Arkona in a 6 round left arm match at King Of The Table 12. Larratt came out victorious with a score of 4-0. After this match, Larratt dropped to the light heavyweight class to face Ukrainian armwrestler Oleg Petrenko with the right arm at East vs West 15. It was another decisive 4-0 victory for Larratt.

=== Notable matches ===
2026	Ibragim Sagov	Loss	Right Hand	3-4	East vs West 27
2026	Ivan Matyushenko	Won	Left Hand	4-0	East vs West 26
2026	Matt Mask	Won	Right Hand	3-1	Bras de fer Opticiwan 2026
2026	Vitaly Laletin	Won	Right Hand	4-1	East vs West 23
2026	Vitaly Laletin	Loss	Left Hand	0-4	East vs West 22
2025	Kody Merrit	Won	Left Hand	2-0	UAL NEVADA 2025
2025	Kody Merrit	Won	Right Hand	2-0	UAL NEVADA 2025
2025	Alex Kurdecha	Won	Right Hand	3-0	East vs West 19
2025	Alex Kurdecha	Won	Left Hand	3-0	East vs West 19
2025	Alex Kurdecha	Won	Left Hand	3-1	East vs West 18
2025	Corey West	Won	Left Hand	3-0	East vs West 17
2025	Genadi Kvikvinia	Won	Right Hand	4-1	East vs West 16
2024	Oleg Petrenko	Won	Right Hand	4-0	East vs West 15
2024	Leonidas Arkona	Won	Left Hand	4-0	KOTT 12
2024	Chance Shaw	Won	Right Hand	3-1	East vs West 14
2024	Levan Saginashvili	Loss	Right Hand	0-4	East vs West 12
2024	Kamil Jablonski	Loss	Left Hand	1-5	Arm Wars The Gathering II
2024	Pavlo Derbedyenyev	Won	Left Hand	3-1	Exhibition
2023	Georgi Tsvetkov	Won	Right Hand	6-0	KOTT 9
2023	Denis Cyplenkov	Won	Right Hand	5-0	East vs West 10
2023	Georgi Tsvetkov	Won	Left Hand	6-0	Arm Wars Dark Card 3
2023	Ermes Gasparini	Won	Right Hand	5-0	East vs West 9
2023	Sergey Kalinichenko	Won	Left Hand	4-0	AWC Reloaded
2023	Ryan Espey	Won	Right Hand	1-0	2023 Canadian Nationals
2023	Ryan Espey	Won	Left Hand	3-0	2023 Canadian Nationals
2023	Dave Chaffee	Won	Right Hand	6-0	KOTT 7
2023	Yordan Tsonev	Won	Left Hand	4-0	BSA 4
2023	Daniel Lund Kristensen	Won	Left Hand	6-0	Arm Wars Dark Card 2
2023	Mindaugas Dulskas	Won	Left Hand	6-0	Arm Wars Dark Card 2
2023	Genadi Kvikvinia	Loss	Right Hand	2-3	East vs West 7
2023	Sandris Sedis	Won	Left Hand	4-2	Arm Wars Dark Card
2023	Sandris Sedis	Won	Right Hand	6-0	Arm Wars Dark Card
2022	Evgeny Prudnik	Won	Right Hand	3-0	East vs West 5
2022	Levan Saginashvili	Loss	Right Hand	0-6	KOTT 4
2021	John Brzenk	Won	Right Hand	4-0	KOTT 2
2021	Michael Todd	Won	Right Hand	6-0	KOTT 1
2021	Janek Kwias	Won	Right Hand	3-0	BAL 204
2021	Janek Kwias	Won	Left Hand	3-0	BAL 204
2020	Rick Heidebrecht	Won	Right Hand	3-0	BAL 105
2020	Rick Heidebrecht	Won	Left Hand	3-0	BAL 105
2020	Tyler Bolzan	Won	Left Hand	3-1	BAL 102
2019	Markus Liebminger	Won	Left Hand	3-1	Tattoo Slam 2019
2019	Wagner Bortolato	Won	Left Hand	3-1	WAL 506
2019	Ryan Scott	Won	Right Hand	3-0	Arnold Classic Australia
2019	Lachlan Adair	Won	Left Hand	3-0	Arnold Classic Australia
2019	Dave Chaffee	Won	Right Hand	3-1	WAL 504
2019	Todd Hutchings	Won	Right Hand	3-0	WAL 501
2018	Denis Cyplenkov	Loss	Left Hand	0-6	PAL Armfight #50
2018	Michael Todd	Loss	Right Hand	2-3	WAL 406
2018	Matt Mask	Won	Right Hand	3-1	WAL 405
2018	Jerry Cadorette	Won	Right Hand	3-2	WAL 402
2018	Robert Stakston	Won	Right Hand	4-2	Viking Arms 2018
2017	Zhao Zi Rui	Won	Right Hand	3-0	SAL Supermatch
2017	Zhao Zi Rui	Won	Left Hand	3-0	SAL Supermatch
2017	Frank Budelewski	Won	Right Hand	2-1	Buffalo Fitness Expo 2017
2017	Alexandre Paquette	Won	Right Hand	3-0	Arm Melter 29
2017	Matt Mask	Won	Right Hand	2-0	WAL Championships
2017	Ron Bath	Won	Right Hand	1-0	WAL Championships
2017	Matt Mask	Won	Left Hand	2-1	WAL Championships
2016	Ron Bath	Won	Right Hand	2-0	WAL Championships
2016	Marcio Barboza	Won	Right Hand	2-0	WAL Championships
2016	Matt Mask	Won	Left Hand	2-0	WAL Championships
2016	Scott Ballinger	Won	Left Hand	2-0	WAL Championships
2016	Matt Mask	Won	Right Hand	2-0	WAL Northern Regionals
2016	Marcio Barboza	Won	Right Hand	2-0	WAL Northern Regionals
2016	Matt Mask	Won	Left hand	2-0	WAL Northern Regionals
2016	Hasan Monfils	Won	Left hand	2-0	WAL Northern Regionals
2015	John Brzenk	Loss	Right Hand	1-2	WAL Championships
2015	Marcio Barboza	Loss	Right Hand	0-2	WAL Championships
2015	Marcio Barboza	Won	Left Hand	2-0	WAL Championships
2015	Tom Nelson	Won	Left Hand	2-0	WAL Championships
2015	Ron Bath	Won	Right Hand	2-1	WAL Southern Regionals
2015	Normunds Tomsons	Won	Right Hand	2-0	WAL Southern Regionals
2015	Ron Bath	Won	Left Hand	2-0	WAL Southern Regionals
2015	Normunds Tomsons	Won	Left Hand	2-0	WAL Southern Regionals
2014	Marcio Barboza	Loss	Right Hand	0-2	WAL Atlantic City
2014	Marcio Barboza	Won	Left Hand	2-1	WAL Atlantic City
2014	Giorgi Gelashvili	Won	Left Hand	2-0	WAL Atlantic City
2014	Don Underwood	Won	Right Hand	3-0	Game of Arms
2014	Travis Bagent	Won	Right Hand	3-1	Game of Arms
2014	Steven Green	Won	Right Hand	2-0	WAL Chicago
2014	Kenny Hughes	Won	Left Hand	2-0	WAL Chicago
2014	Christian Binnie	Won	Left Hand	1-0	WAL Las Vegas
2013	Ian Carnegie	Won	Right Hand	3-0	Arm Melter 19
2013	Mike Gould	Won	Left Hand	3-1	Arm Melter 19
2013	Joe Gould	Won	Left Hand	3-1	Arm Melter 19
2013	Oleg Zhokh	Won	Left Hand	3-0	UAL 4
2013	Eric Woelfel	Won	Left Hand	1-0	UAL 4
2013	Wilton Brock	Won	Left Hand	1-0	UAL 4
2012	Tim Bresnan	Won	Right Hand	4-3	MLA Supermatch
2012	Andrey Pushkar	Won	Left Hand	5-1	PAL Armfight #42
2012	Earl Wilson	Won	Left Hand	1-0	Mike Gould Classic 2012
2012	Richard Lupkes	Won	Right Hand	1-0	Mike Gould Classic 2012
2011	Christophe Ladu	Won	Left Hand	6-0	Arm Wars "Acid Reign"
2011	Michael Todd	Won	Right Hand	4-2	Arm Wars "Acid Reign"
2011	Travis Bagent	Loss	Left Hand	1-3	UAL Backyard Brawl
2011	Travis Bagent	Won	Right Hand	3-0	UAL Backyard Brawl
2010	Travis Bagent	Won	Left Hand	4-3	Arm Wars "Sin City"
2010	Don Underwood	Won	Right Hand	4-3	Arm Wars "Sin City"
2010	Tim Bresnan	Won	Right Hand	5-1	Arm Wars "Sin City"
2010	Richard Lupkes	Won	Right Hand	6-0	Arm Wars "Sin City"
2009	Dave Randall	Won	Right Hand	2-0	NEAC VII
2009	Sylvain Perron	Won	Left Hand	1-0	Mike Gould Classic 2009
2009	Mike Gould	Won	Right Hand	1-0	Mike Gould Classic 2009
2008	Marcio Barboza	Won	Left Hand	5-1	Arm Wars "Deep Water"
2008	Michael Todd	Won	Left Hand	6-0	Arm Wars "Deep Water"
2008	Johan Lindholm	Won	Right Hand	6-0	Arm Wars "Deep Water"
2008	John Brzenk	Won	Right Hand	6-0	Arm Wars "Deep Water"
2008	Travis Bagent	Loss	Left Hand	1-5	Arm Wars XI
2008	Travis Bagent	Won	Right Hand	5-1	Arm Wars XI
2007	Ron Bath	Won	Left Hand	6-0	Arm Wars X
2007	Ron Bath	Won	Right Hand	6-0	Arm Wars X
2006	Taras Ivakin	Loss	Right Hand	2-4	PAL Armfight #26
2006	Ron Bath	Won	Right Hand	3-1	Mike Gould Classic 2006
2005	Tim Bresnan	Won	Right Hand	3-0	Battle in the Capital II
2005	Simon Perron	Won	Right Hand	1-0	Mike Gould Classic 2005
2005	Sylvain Perron	Won	Left Hand	1-0	Mike Gould Classic 2005
2005	Travis Bagent	Loss	Right Hand	1-3	Mike Gould Classic 2005
2004	John Brzenk	Loss	Right Hand	0-2	SuperStar Showdown
2004	Marcio Barboza	Won	Right Hand	2-0	SuperStar Showdown
2004	Jacob Abbott	Won	Right Hand	2-0	SuperStar Showdown
2004	George Gottschalk	Won	Left Hand	1-0	Ontario Championships
2004	Greg Boyes	Won	Right Hand	1-0	Ontario Championships
2004	Mike Bowling	Won	Right Hand	1-0	Ontario Championships
2003	Mike Gould	Won	Left Hand	3-0	Ontario Championships
2003	Garth Carlson	Won	Right Hand	3-0	Ontario Championships
2003	Rob Graham	Won	Right Hand	3-0	Ontario Championships
2002	Mike Gould	Won	Right Hand	1-0	Niagara Championships
1999	Krister Jonsson	Won	Right Hand	1-0	WAF Worlds 1999
1999	John Brzenk	Loss	Left Hand	0-1	WAF Worlds 1999

== Armwrestling style ==
Devon Larratt is known as both an extremely versatile and enduring armwrestler. Larratt is notable for being proficient with essentially any move, whether it be a hook, toproll, press, king's move, king's hook, or any variation thereof. Additionally, he is unique for his unusually high levels of endurance, a trait that is most advantageous during supermatches. Oftentimes, he only needs to stop the initial surge of his opponent in order to hold them in a disadvantageous position, tire them as the match progresses, and eventually pin them.

While Larratt is relatively less muscular than other heavyweights or super heavyweights, armwrestling depends a lot on tendon strength rather than pure muscular size. Nevertheless, his forearms, the most important muscle group in armwrestling, are comparable to any other top super heavyweight. Frequently, he is able to overcome power differentials with superior technical skill, arm leverage, and hand control, stopping his opponent and draining them of their strength over time, rather than explosively overpowering opponents.

== Personal life ==
Since 2003, Devon Larratt has been married to Jodi Larratt, an actress and former armwrestler; together, they have three children.

Larratt is active on social media, collaborating in YouTube videos with other strength athletes, including four time World's Strongest Man champion Brian Shaw. Larratt generally eats pancakes while training for super-matches, and these humorous pancake videos have subsequently inspired a comical and entertaining storyline within the arm wrestling community, whereby other armwrestlers discuss and adopt Larratt's "pancake diet". To carry on with this jest, Devon's fans will often mail him maple syrup and pancake mix. Devon is also the owner of Armbet, a mobile matchmaking and betting application for arm wrestling.
