= Denis Cyplenkov =

Professional armwrestler born 1982

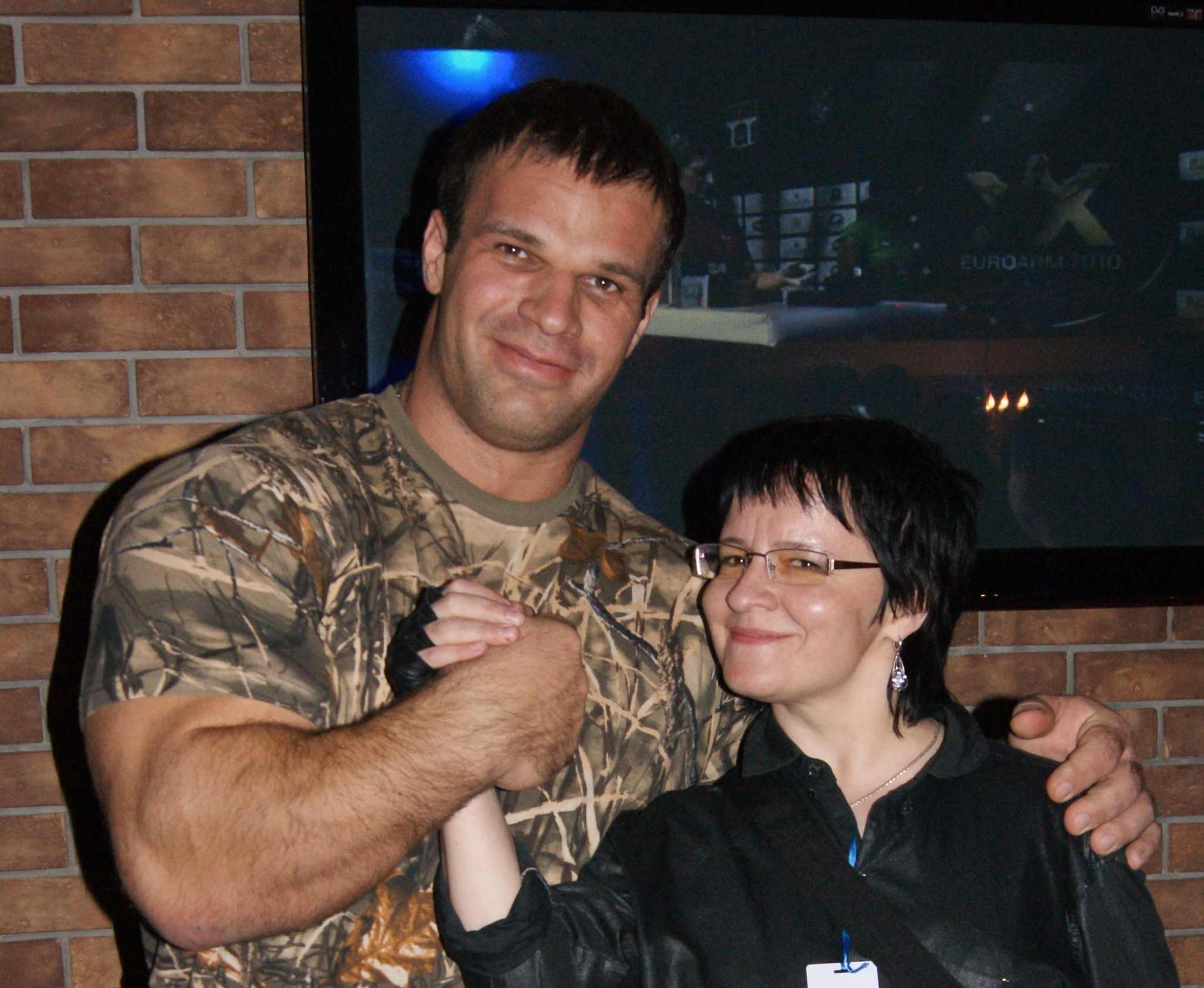
- Denis Cyplenkov (left) at the Russian Armwrestling Championship 2011

Personal information
- Nicknames: The Russian Hulk, Cyborg
- Nationality: Russian, Ukrainian
- Citizenship: Unknown
- Born: March 10, 1982 (age 44) (Krivoi Rog, Soviet Union) now Krivoi Rog, Ukraine
- Occupations: Arm wrestler, powerlifter and strongman
- Height: 186 cm (6 ft 1 in)
- Weight: 130 kg (287 lb)
- Website: Ciplenkov.ru

Sport
- Country: Russia
- Sport: Arm Wrestling

Denis Ivanovich Cyplenkov, nicknamed the Russian Hulk, (born 10 March 1982) is a Ukrainian-born Russian professional arm-wrestler, former strongman, and former powerlifter. Denis has four Nemiroff World Cup super heavyweight victories (on both hands), multiple A1 Russian Open World Armwrestling Grand Prix championship titles and seven Zloty Tur absolute division championship titles. He is widely accepted to be one of the best arm-wrestlers and the best left arm arm-wrestler of the superheavyweight category.

== Early life ==
Denis was born in Krivoi Rog, Ukraine in 1982 and began his athletic journey at a young age. By 6, he was already involved in various sports programs. In 1993, he discovered kettlebell lifting under coach Yakimenko, achieving success until his mid-teens. In 2002, a chance encounter with Vladimir Turchinsky led him to become a trainer at the "Marcus Aurelius" club. The years 2002-2004 saw Denis excel in power extreme, winning multiple tournaments and becoming a member of the Russian team.With kettlebell lifting's decline, Denis transitioned to arm-wrestling under coach Moiseyev. This new path led him to junior championships in Ukraine and Europe.

== Career ==
In 2008, Denis Cyplenkov received his first significant opportunity in the Professional Armwrestling League (PAL) Vendetta, where he competed against Andrey Pushkar. He won his first left arm supermatch during this event. Over the next few years, Cyplenkov participated in various arm-wrestling competitions, remaining actively involved in the sport.

In 2008, Cyplenkov’s career advanced when he began training under coach Kote Razmadze, who played a pivotal role in helping him claim the intercontinental belt and become a professional arm-wrestling world champion. Despite several opportunities, Cyplenkov did not compete in the European Arm-wrestling Federation (EAF) European Championships or the World Armwrestling Federation (WAF) World Championships, instead focusing on the world's top professional events.

Between 2010 and 2013, Cyplenkov competed in the Nemiroff World Cup three times, winning the super heavyweight division with both arms at each appearance and securing five Absolute division titles. He also participated in the A1 Russian Open from 2012 to 2014, where he won five Absolute (open) division titles. Additionally, Cyplenkov earned seven Absolute division world championship titles at the Zloty Tur World Cup during his career.

A notable moment in Cyplenkov’s career occurred in 2014, when he faced Dave Chaffee at the A1 Russian Open. Cyplenkov emerged victorious in this match and stated that it was the hardest arm-wrestling match he's ever had. Shortly after, he took a break from arm-wrestling to focus on powerlifting. A year after his informally announced retirement, Denis set the strict curl world record in 2015 with a lift of 113 kg (249 lb).

Cyplenkov returned to arm-wrestling in 2016, defeating Michael Todd in a right-arm supermatch in the Vendetta All Stars #46 tournament. Two years later, he returned to the sport once more to have a left arm supermatch against Devon Larratt in the Vendetta All Stars #50 tournament and defeated him successfully, earning him the WAL left arm Legacy Hammer.

In 2019, while preparing for another supermatch, Cyplenkov suffered a ruptured blood vessel near his kidney due to high blood pressure and intense training, which caused an onslaught of several other health problems and forced him into retiring from the sport of arm-wrestling. After the COVID-19 pandemic, he returned to competition on February 25, 2023, securing a King of the Table (KOTT) supermatch victory against John Brzenk. On November 11, 2023, he faced Devon Larratt in a right-arm match at the East vs West event but was defeated. Following the match, Cyplenkov acknowledged underestimating Larratt, stated that his preparation was rushed and that his methods of training alongside his strategy was incorrect.

In 2024, Cyplenkov’s rushed return to competitive arm-wrestling led to the recurrence of health issues while preparing for another supermatch, prompting him to take another hiatus and have the supermatch postponed. As of January 21, 2025, Denis has stated that he will resume competition in the East vs West event in May 2025, however an opponent or an official statement regarding the details of this supermatch hasn't been made yet.

Cyplenkov previously held the world record for strict curl at 113 kg since 2015. However, on August 28, 2021, Leroy Walker surpassed his record with a strict curl of 114 kg. Regardless, Denis Cyplenkov still holds the wide grip strict curl world record as of February 20, 2025.

In 2018, he was scheduled to compete against Andrey Pushkar with his right arm for Pal #50. Pushkar died in a car accident in Ukraine while in route to the airport. In honour of Pushkar's memory, the tournament proceeded as planned, and Cyplenkov offered the championship belt to Pushkar's family as a gesture of respect and condolence.

During Vendetta All Stars Armfight #50, Devon Larratt lost a left-handed supermatch against Denis Cyplenkov, in which Cyplenkov won 6–0. After the match, Larratt said Cyplenkov was most likely "25 to 30% stronger". Later on, Larratt sent the left-handed legacy hammer to Denis Cyplenkov. The hammer, although created by the WAL exclusively for its champions, is a symbolic representation of the world's best arm-wrestler, and the wielder of the legacy hammer must ensure that the hammer belongs to the person most worthy. Denis had to forfeit the Legacy Hammer to Artyom Morozov on November 21, 2024 as his left arm wasn't in competition shape due to injuries. Current hammer holders as of October 19, 2025 are Levan Saginashvili (right hand) and Vitaly Laletin (left hand).

== Records ==
Denis is widely recognized as a figure in the arm wrestling circuit, having achieved multiple victories at the esteemed Nemiroff World Cup and securing numerous national championship titles in Russia. He has also had success in European arm wrestling championships.

Year	Opponent	Result	Hand	Outcome	Event
2023	Devon Larratt	Loss	Right Hand	0-3	East vs West 10
2023	John Brzenk	Won	Right Hand	6-0	KOTT 6
2018	Devon Larratt	Won	Left Hand	6-0	PAL Armfight #50
2016	Michael Todd	Won	Right Hand	4-2	
2014	Dave Chaffe	Won	Right Hand	2-0	Zloty Tur/Nemiroff World Cup
2013	Andrey Puhskar	Won	Left Hand	1-0	Zloty Tur/Nemiroff World Cup
2013	Dave Chaffe	Won	Right Hand	1-0	Zloty Tur/Nemiroff World Cup
2013	Andrey Puhskar	Won	Left Hand	1-0	Zloty Tur/Nemiroff World Cup
2013	Arsen Liliev	Won	Right Hand	3-0	Russian Open
2012	Arsen Liliev	Loss	Right Hand	2-3	Russian Open
2011	Andrey Puhskar	Won	Right Hand	1-0	Zloty Tur/Nemiroff World Cup
2011	Andrey Puhskar	Loss	Right Hand	0-1	Zloty Tur/Nemiroff World Cup
2011	Andrey Puhskar	Won	Right Hand	1-0	Zloty Tur/Nemiroff World Cup
2011	Andrey Puhskar	Won	Left Hand	1-0	Zloty Tur/Nemiroff World Cup
2010	Andrey Puhskar	Won	Right Hand	1-0	Zloty Tur/Nemiroff World Cup
2010	Rustam Babayev	Won	Left Hand	1-0	Zloty Tur/Nemiroff World Cup
2010	Andrey Puhskar	Won	Right Hand	1-0	Zloty Tur/Nemiroff World Cup
2010	Andrey Pushkar	Won	Left Hand	1-0	Zloty Tur/Nemiroff World Cup
2009	John Brzenk	Loss	Right Hand	1-5	PAL Armfight #37
2008	John Brzenk	Loss	Right Hand	0-2	
2008	Andrey Pushkar	Won	Left Hand	6-0	PAL Armfight #33
2006	Andrey Pushkar	Won	Left Hand	6-0	
