= John Brzenk =

American arm wrestler (born 1964)

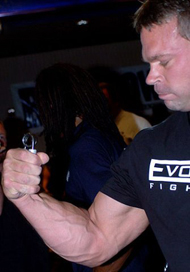
- Brzenk in November 2006

Personal information
- Nicknames: The Perfect Storm, G.O.A.T.
- Born: July 15, 1964 (age 62) McHenry, Illinois, US
- Occupation: Arm wrestler
- Height: 5 ft 11 in (180 cm)
- Weight: 229 lb (104 kg)

Sport
- Country: United States
- Sport: Arm wrestling

John Richard Brzenk (born July 15, 1964) is a former professional armwrestler from the United States of America who is often referred to as "the greatest armwrestler of all time". Over his career, he has won more than 500 championship titles.

== Biography and accomplishments ==
John Brzenk's father, John Brzenk Sr., was an arm wrestler, and Brzenk says he gained some of his forearm size through genetics.

Brzenk started his amateur career in the classroom, where he arm wrestled students across tables for five years. When he was in eighth grade, he broke his arm while arm wrestling his father's friend, and has stated that this breakage increased his tendon strength significantly. Over the years, Brzenk has often been called "The Giant Crusher", "The Golden Boy", "G.O.A.T.", and the "Perfect Storm" for his ability to pin opponents twice his size.

Brzenk started his professional career in 1982, at the age of 18, where he won his first world title on ABC's 1983 Wide World of Sports. From 1982 to 2015, he only lost a single supermatch, and only a handful of people had beaten him in tournaments. Most of these losses occurred later during that time, when he was older. Two of his most prominent losses were to Alexey Voyevoda in 2004 and Devon Larratt in 2008, both of whom are considered legendary arm wrestlers.

Aside from arm wrestling, Brzenk works as a mechanic at Delta Air Lines. He says the job is non-physical so his arms get plenty of rest.

During his career he has competed for upwards of US$80,000.

Brzenk won championships in a number of different weight classes, including four world championships in the heavyweight division, and the middleweight world championship.

He also had an uncredited cameo in the 1987 Sylvester Stallone film Over the Top, and was the subject of the feature documentary Pulling John, directed by Vassiliki Khonsari and Sevan Matossian. The documentary chronicles Brzenk's legendary arm wrestling career by following him intimately for four years, during which he competes in global tournaments and ponders retiring from the sport he loves.

After defeating Marcio Barboza in the 2015 WAL Heavyweight Right-Handed Championship, Brzenk took an extended period of time off from armwrestling due to injuries.

== Arm wrestling comeback ==
In 2018, Brzenk lost an attempted comeback match against Travis Bagent in Moldova. On July 31, 2021, Brzenk returned to arm wrestling full time by defeating Chance Shaw in a supermatch. On December 11 of the same year, Brzenk faced right-handed heavyweight title holder Devon Larratt at King of the Table 2 (KOTT 2). Despite Brzenk defeating Larratt in one of his most recent matches before his layoff from armwrestling, a bigger, stronger Larratt proved to be too much for Brzenk, who lost by a score of 4–0.

On February 10, 2022, Brzenk made his debut at the international arm wrestling tournament East vs West 2 by defeating Khadzimurat Zoloev. This win allowed him to reclaim, at the age of 57, the world's top ranking in the 225 pound division. On May 21, at East vs West 3, Brzenk had a match against Zurab Tavberidze. Brzenk won this match by a score of 3–2.

On August 6, 2022, at East vs West 4, Brzenk was defeated in a right-handed supermatch with Kazakhstan armwrestler Kydyrgali Ongarbaev. On November 19 of the same year, in the next installment of East vs West, Brzenk defeated Oleg Petrenko in a right-handed supermatch in dominant fashion, 3–0.

On January 21, 2023, Brzenk participated in a fifth consecutive installment of East vs West, losing a hard-fought supermatch to Irakli Zirakashvili by a score of 3–2. The next month, on February 25, Brzenk had his toughest test to date, a match at KOTT 6 against Super Heavyweight Denis Cyplenkov, the former world #1 who had not had a match in four years due to health issues. Despite the long layoff, Cyplenkov did not look like he had lost any of his physical or table ability, defeating Brzenk by an almost effortless 6–0 score. On August 12, 2023, Brzenk lost 0–4 to Todd Hutchings at the AWC Reloaded event.

On September 23, 2023, Brzenk went against Alexey Voyevoda at King of the Table 8. This was a rematch of their historic first match in 2004, which Voyevoda won. Circumstances were different this time, as Voyevoda had not competed in years and was not as dominant as he had been. Brzenk won the match 4–2.

Brzenk announced his retirement after his match against Yoshinobu Kanai.

== Physical statistics ==
- Height: 5'11"
- Weight: Varies between 190 and 253 lbs, depending on competition classes
- Style: Varies
- Biceps: 18.25in
- Forearm:
  - Right: 16.5in
  - Left: 13.5in

=== Notable matches ===
Year	Opponent	Result	Hand	Outcome	Event
2025	Yoshinobu Kanai	Loss	Right hand	0-3	East vs West 17
2024	Leonidas Arkona	Won	Right hand	3-0	East vs West 14
2024	Krasimir Kostadinov	Loss	Right hand	0-3	East vs West 11
2023	Sasho Andreev	Loss	Right hand	0-5	East vs West 10
2023	Alexey Voevoda	Won	Right hand	4-2	KOTT 8
2023	Todd Hutchings	Loss	Right hand	0-4	AWC Fight Night 2
2023	Denis Cyplenkov	Loss	Right hand	0-6	KOTT 6
2023	Irakli Zirakashvili	Loss	Right hand	2-3	East vs West 6
2022	Oleg Petrenko	Won	Right hand	3-0	East vs West 5
2022	Kydyrgali Ongarbaev	Loss	Right hand	1-3	East vs West 4
2022	Corey West	Won	Right hand	3-2	Monster Factory 2
2022	Zurab Tavbaridze	Won	Right hand	3-2	East vs West 3
2022	Pavlo Derbedyenyev	Won	Right hand	3-0	Kentucky Muscle 2022
2022	Engin Terzi	Won	Right hand	3-0	Hardanger Open 2022
2022	Khadzimurat Zoloev	Won	Right hand	3-0	East vs West 2
2021	Devon Larratt	Loss	Right hand	0-4	KOTT 2
2021	Paul Linn	Won	Right hand	3-0	Virginia State Championships
2021	Dmitriy Kachan	Won	Right hand	3-0	Texas State Championships
2021	Chance Shaw	Won	Right hand	3-1	Dave Patton Classic
2019	Derek Smith	Won	Right hand	3-0	NAL Qualifier 2019
2018	Sergey Patrikeev	Won	Right hand	2-1	WEA Grand Prix 2018
2018	Petro Marharint	Loss	Right hand	0-2	WEA Grand Prix 2018
2018	Aliaksandr Yankovski	Won	Right hand	2-0	WEA Grand Prix 2018
2018	Travis Bagent	Loss	Right hand	0-2	Moldova Open Cup 2
2016	Yoshinobu Kanai	Loss	Right hand	0-2	2016 Japan Open in Sendai
2015	Andrey Pushkar	Loss	Right hand	0-3	A1 Russian Open 2015
2015	Khadzhimurat Zoloev	Won	Right hand	3-0	A1 Russian Open 2015
2015	Soslan Gassiev	Won	Right hand	2-0	A1 Russian Open 2015
2015	Marcio Barboza	Won	Right hand	2-0	WAL Championships
2015	Devon Larratt	Won	Right hand	2-1	WAL Championships
2015	Matt Mask	Won	Right hand	2-0	WAL Western Region
2015	Tom Nelson	Won	Right hand	2-0	WAL Western Region
2015	Tom Nelson	Won	Left hand	2-0	WAL Western Region
2015	Matt Mask	Won	Left hand	2-0	WAL Western Region
2015	Matt Mask	Won	Right hand	3-2	UAL 9
2015	Marcio Barboza	Won	Right hand	2-0	WAL Championship
2015	Devon Larratt	Won	Right hand	6-0	WAL Championship
2014	Michael Todd	Won	Right hand	2-0	UAL 8
2014	Dave Chaffee	Won	Right hand	2-0	A1 Russian Open 2014
2014	Andrey Pushkar	Loss	Right hand	0-3	A1 Russian Open 2014
2014	Alexey Semerenko	Won	Right hand	2-0	A1 Russian Open 2014
2013	Ryan Espey	Won	Left hand	4-1	Mayhem in the Mall 2013
2013	Marcio Barboza	Loss	Left hand	0-2	UAL 4
2013	Marcio Barboza	Won	Right hand	2-0	UAL 4
2013	Krasimir Kostadinov	Loss	Right hand	0-5	Super Matches in Turkey
2012	Vasilli Dautashvili	Loss	Right hand	2-4	PAL Armfight #41
2012	Terence Opperman	Won	Right hand	5-1	PAL Armfight #41
2012	Dmitry Trubin	Loss	Right hand	0-6	PAL Armfight #41
2012	Chris Chandler	Won	Left hand	5-1	UAL Demons of Destruction
2011	Terence Opperman	Won	Right hand	4-2	South Africa 2011
2011	Terence Opperman	Draw	Left hand	3-3	South Africa 2011
2011	Chris Chandler	Won	Right hand	2-0	UAL 2
2011	Adis Turcinhodzic	Won	Right hand	2-0	UAL 2
2010	Jerry Cadorette	Loss	Right hand	1-2	UAL 1
2010	Rob Vigeant Jr	Won	Right hand	2-0	UAL 1
2010	Chris Chandler	Won	Left hand	2-0	UAL 1
2010	Rob Vigeant Jr	Won	Left hand	2-0	UAL 1
2010	Arsen Liliev	Loss	Right hand	2-3	Istanbul International Friendship Night II
2009	Ron Bath	Won	Right hand	3-0	2009 ROTN
2009	Rob Vigeant Jr	Won	Right hand	2-0	2009 ROTN
2009	Travis Bagent	Loss	Left hand	2-3	2009 ROTN
2009	Tom Nelson	Won	Left hand	2-0	2009 ROTN
2009	Denis Cyplenkov	Won	Right hand	5-1	PAL Armfight #37
2009	Tim Bresnan	Won	Right hand	3-0	NEAC VI
2008	Michael Todd	Won	Right hand	6-0	Arm Wars "Deep Water"
2008	Devon Larratt	Loss	Right hand	0-6	Arm Wars "Deep Water"
2008	Dmitry Kochiev	Won	Right hand	4-2	PAL Armfight #34
2007	Andrey Pushkar	Won	Right hand	2-0	Nemiroff World Cup 2007
2007	Ion Oncescu	Won	Left hand	2-0	Nemiroff World Cup 2007
2007	Taras Ivakin	Won	Right hand	4-2	PAL Armfight #30
2007	Ion Oncescu	Won	Right hand	5-1	PAL Armfight #29
2007	Giorgi Gelashvili	Won	Left hand	2-0	2007 Mohegan Sun
2007	Marcio Barboza	Won	Right hand	3-0	NAL/Vyotech II
2006	Andrey Pushkar	Won	Right hand	6-0	PAL Armfight #27
2006	Travis Bagent	Won	Right hand	2-1	2006 JAWA Special East Tournament Match
2006	Yoshinobu Kanai	Won	Right hand	2-0	2006 JAWA Special East Tournament Match
2006	Shigeki Kanai	Won	Right hand	2-0	2006 JAWA Special East Tournament Match
2005	Alexey Semerenko	Won	Right hand	5-1	PAL Armfight #17
2005	Todd Hutchings	Won	Right hand	2-0	Superstar Showdown 2
2005	Taras Ivakin	Won	Right hand	4-2	PAL Armfight #15
2005	Travis Bagent	Loss	Right hand	0-2	Ultimate Armwrestling II
2005	Todd Hutchings	Won	Right hand	2-0	Ultimate Armwrestling II
2004	Devon Larratt	Won	Right hand	2-0	SuperStar Showdown
2004	Alexey Voevoda	Loss	Right hand	0-1 (Elimination)	Zloty Tur Cup
2003	Yoshinobu Kanai	Won	Right hand	2-1	2003 JAWA Special Match
1999	Ron Bath	Won	Right hand	1-0	WAF Worlds 1999
1999	Devon Larratt	Won	Right hand	1-0	WAF Worlds 1999
1983	Dave Patton	Loss	Right hand	2-0	N/A

== Achievements ==
Key
Symbol	Description
L	Left hand
R	Right hand

- A1 Russian Open

- 2015 – R-2nd Place
- 2014 – R-3rd Place

- AAA Stand-Up National

- 1984 – R200 lbs
- 1985 – R185 lbs
- 1986 – R220 lbs
- 1990 – R220 lbs

- Arnold Classic

- 2006 – R199+
- 2007 – R199+

- AWI World

- 1986 – Pro Super Heavyweight
- 1987 – Pro Light Heavyweight
- 1988 – Pro Light Heavyweight
- 1995 – Pro Light Heavyweight
- 2001 – Pro Super Heavyweight

- Carling O’Keefe International

- 1989 – R 200 lbs, R 231+ lbs

- Forsa Tropical International

- 1998 – R198 lbs, R243+ lbs, L198 lbs

- GNC Pro Performance

- 2002 – R198 lbs

- GOLDEN BEAR

- SUPERMATCH (Absolut Champion)

- R1994

- Pro tournament

- R90+ kg: 1990, 1994, 1998
- R90 kg: 1990

- Harley Pull

- 2000 – R220 lbs + Harley Winner
- 2001 – R220 lbs
- 2002 – R198 lbs, L198 lbs
- 2009 – R225 lbs, L225 lbs + Harley Winner

- Main Event

- 1998 – R220 lbs

- Mike Gould Classic

- 2006 – R220 lbs, L220 lbs
- 2010 – R220 lbs

- Mohegan Sun PAC World

- 2005 – R198 lbs, L198 lbs
- 2006 – R242 lbs, R243+ lbs
- 2007 – R198 lbs, L198 lbs

- Over the Top

- 1986 – Winner of Truckers Division in Heavyweight class

- Reno Reunion

- 1999 – R200 lbs, R230 lbs, R231+ lbs, L200 lbs
- 2000 – R198 lbs, R242 lbs, R243+ lbs, L198 lbs, L242 lbs
- 2001 – R198 lbs, R242 lbs, R243+ lbs, L198 lbs
- 2002 – R198 lbs, R242 lbs, R243+ lbs, L198 lbs, L242 lbs
- 2003 – R233+ lbs
- 2006 – R242 lbs, R243+ lbs
- 2006 – R242 lbs, R243+ lbs

- ROTN

- 2007 – R215 lbs, L215 lbs
- 2008 – R242 lbs, L242 lbs
- 2009 – R199+ lbs

- Sands International Wrist Wrestling/Armwrestling

- 1988 – R190 lbs
- 1989 – R190 lbs, R215 lbs

- Sherkston Beaches International

- 1987 – R200 lbs, R201+ lbs

- SuperStar Showdown

- 2004 – R199+ lbs
- 2005 – R198 lbs

- Ultimate Armwrestling (Las Vegas)

- 2004 – R242 lbs
- 2005 – R198 lbs, L198 lbs
- 2006 – R242 lbs, R243+ lbs

- Ultimate Armwrestling League

- 2011 – R200 lbs

- USAA National Pro-Am

- 1996 – R200 lbs, R201+ lbs
- 1997 – R198 lbs, R242 lbs, R243+ lbs, L198 lbs
- 1998 – R242 lbs, R243+ lbs
- 1999 – R198 lbs, R242 lbs, R243+ lbs, L198 lbs, L242 lbs
- 2000 – R242 lbs, R243+ lbs, L242 lbs, L243+ lbs
- 2001 – R242 lbs, R243+ lbs, L242 lbs, L243+ lbs
- 2002 – R198 lbs, R242 lbs, R243+ lbs, L198 lbs, L242 lbs
- 2003 – R242 lbs, R243+ lbs
- 2004 – R242 lbs, R243+ lbs, L242 lbs
- 2005 – R242 lbs
- 2006 – R242 lbs, R243+ lbs
- 2007 – R242 lbs, R243+ lbs
- 2009 – R242 lbs, R243+ lbs, L242 lbs, L243+ lbs
- 2010 – R242 lbs, R243+ lbs

- USAF Unified National

- 2005 – R220 lbs

- WAF World Armwrestling Championship

- 1999 – L100 kg, R: Supermatch Winner

- WAL

- 2015 – R: Heavyweight Champion

- World Wristwrestling Championship (Petaluma)

- Heavyweight Division

- R: 1988, 1989, 1990, 1991, 1996, 1998, 2001

- Light Heavyweight Division

- R: 1998, 2001
- L: 1998, 2001

- Middleweight Division

- R – 1988, 1989, 1990, 1991, 1996, 1998, 2001
- L – 1996, 1998, 2001

- Lightweight Division

- R – 1984

- WPAA World

- 1985 – Middleweight

- Yukon Jack National/World

- Heavyweight Division

- R: 1990, 1991, 1992, 1993,

- Middleweight Division

- R: 1995, 1996.

- Zloty Tur/Nemiroff World Cup

- Category – Open

- R: 2006, 2007, 2008, 2009

- Category – 95 kg

- R: 2004, 2006, 2007, 2008, 2009
- L: 2007, 2009
