= Armwrestling Federation of Armenia =

Sporting Organization

Armwrestling Federation of Armenia logo

The Armwrestling Federation of Armenia (Armenian: Հայաստանի բազկամարտի ֆեդերացիա), is the regulating body of arm wrestling in Armenia, governed by the Armenian Olympic Committee. The headquarters of the federation is located in Yerevan.

== History ==
The Federation is currently led by president Arsen Gabrielyan. In an interview, Gabrielyan stated that, "The encouraging thing is that armwrestling is becoming more and more popular, the interest in arm wrestling is growing." The Federation often participates in the World Armwrestling Championship and the European Armwrestling Championship competitions. The Federation is a full member of the World Armwrestling Federation.

In 2012, Arsen Gabrielyan stated that the Federation seeks to grow the popularity of the sport across the country and that Armenian Armwrestlers have won gold medals at the European Championship level.

In 2017, the World Armwrestling Federation President Mr Assen Hadjitodorov had an official meeting with the Armwrestling Federation of Armenia. Both parties discussed cooperation and avenues to expand the sport in Armenia.

In January 2021, Armenia participated in the 42nd World Armwrestling Championships in Bucharest, winning 6 medals.

== See also ==
- Sport in Armenia
