= Al Green (wrestler) =

American professional wrestler (1955–2013)

Personal information
- Born: Alfred Dobalo; October 15, 1955 Tampa, Florida, United States
- Died: June 14, 2013 (aged 57) Tampa, Florida, United States

Professional wrestling career
- Ring name(s): Al Green; Al Knitti; Big Al Green; Blade; Bounty Hunter #1 (The) Dog; Rage
- Billed height: 6 ft 4 in (193 cm)
- Billed weight: 280 lb (127 kg)
- Billed from: Tampa, Florida
- Trained by: Steve Keirn
- Debut: 1989
- Retired: 2007

Alfred Dobalo (October 15, 1955 – June 14, 2013) was an American professional wrestler best known by his ring name Al Green. In his career, he performed in North America, Europe, and Japan under a variety of gimmicks, including in multiple stints in World Championship Wrestling as Rage as one half of the team The Wrecking Crew with Fury, Blade as one half of the Master Blasters with Steel, and finally as a singles wrestler as The Dog.

== Professional wrestling career ==
Green was trained for a professional wrestling career by Steve Keirn, making his debut in 1989.

=== World Championship Wrestling (1989 - 1991) ===
Green made his professional wrestling debut in World Championship Wrestling, appearing on a World Championship Wrestling taping on June 15, 1989 in August, Georgia in a loss to WCW Television Champion Sting. The rookie was slotted at the bottom of the roster and suffered an early defeat to Ricky Santana. He formed a short lived team with Ron Simmons and faced The Midnight Express that summer, but was winless.

Green's first victory came on July 22, 1989 in Philadelphia, Pennsylvania, where he and Simmons defeated Scott Hall & Joey Maggs. However the duo soon split as Simmons moved to a partnership with Butch Reed as Doom, while Green began teaming with Lee Scott. The new tandem was unsuccessful, losing to The Ding Dongs on house show matches in August 1989. Green then began teaming with Bill Irwin that month, and the team defeated The Ding Dongs on August 24 in Raleigh, North Carolina. His final match of his first year came on August 27, 1989 in New Haven, Connecticut where he was defeated by Ranger Ross.

=== The Master Blasters (1990-1992) ===
On September 22, 1990 Blade was a replacement for Iron, who left World Championship Wrestling after only one match. The reconstituted Master Blasters continued their undefeated streak in October. Meanwhile, Kevin Nash would have his first singles match on September 28, defeating Tom Zenk in Baltimore, Maryland. At Halloween Havoc on October 27, 1990, in Chicago, Illinois the Blasters upended The Southern Boys and began to move up the WCW tag-team ratings. However their winning streak would finally come to an end on November 22 at the Omni in Atlanta, Georgia when Tom Zenk & Brian Pillman handed them their first defeat (Pillman pinning Blade). They rebounded to go on another undefeated streak, defeating The Southern Boys as well as Alan Iron Eagle & Tim Horner and earning a US Tag-Team title shot against the champions The Steiner Brothers. The Steiners however were victorious in matches on December 25 and December 26.

They were pinned as well on television in 52 seconds by the Steiners in a match that aired on WCW Worldwide on February 2, 1991. Following this loss their momentum began to dissipate as the Blasters would suffer follow-up losses to the Southern Boys and Ricky Morton and Tommy Rich. The team disbanded at the end of the month, with Nash briefly continuing to wrestle simply as "The Master Blaster" until being given the new gimmick of "Oz" in May 1991. Meanwhile, Green would leave WCW to compete for Florida Championship Wrestling in The Bounty Hunters tag team as "Bounty Hunter #1". The team won the NWA Florida Tag Team Championship in November, but when Green's partner (Tim Parker) was injured, The Terminator stepped in and defended the tag team titles with Green. The team held the gold until the Nasty Boys beat them on a card in Nassau, Bahamas on January 6, 1991.

After WCW, Green as Master Blaster worked for All Japan Pro Wrestling in 1992.

=== The Wrecking Crew (1992-1997) ===
While the team with The Terminator was a makeshift team at first, but they began teaming regularly first under the name The Terminators then later on as The Wrecking Crew where the Terminator became known as Fury and Al was renamed "Rage". The team competed for the International Wrestling Federation based in Florida showing themselves to be a force in the tag team division. On May 28, 1992, the duo beat IWF Tag Team Champions The Long Riders (Brett Colt and Kip Winchester).

By late 1992 the Wrecking Crew got signed by World Championship Wrestling, making their debut in January 1993. Shortly after their debut the Wrecking Crew got national exposure by competing at Clash of the Champions XXII on January 13 where they defeated Tom Zenk and Johnny Gunn.

After their success at the Clash the team rode on a wave of success defeating Gunn and Zenk repeatedly, as well as looking impressive against temporary teams such as 2 Cold Scorpio and Johnny B. Badd, and Marcus Bagwell and Joey Maggs.

By March the team was contesting a series of matches with future WCW World Tag Team Champions 2 Cold Scorpio and Marcus Alexander Bagwell as well as feuding with the identical twin duo known as The Cole Twins (Keith and Kent Cole). The feud with the Cole Twins was soon expanded to also include Bagwell and Scorpio as well as Tex Slazenger and Shanghai Pierce. As the feud wore on the Cole Twins got the upper hand in the feud over the two big men. The Wrecking Crew also faced Cactus Jack and The Barbarian in a series of house show matches.

As Summer turned to fall the Wrecking Crew's time with WCW ended, returning to the independent scene. In 1994 the Wrecking Crew traveled to Europe to work for Otto Wanz’ Catch Wrestling Association. On July 24 they defeated David Finlay and John Hawk in the finals of a tournament to crown new CWA Tag Team Champions after Larry Cameron had died during a match. Fury and Rage held the belts for only three weeks before being unseated by CWA regulars August Smisl and Ulf Herman in Vienna, Austria.

In 1995, the Wrecking Crew toured with All Japan Pro Wrestling over the summer being put over young teams like Kentaro Shiga and Mannukea Mossman. The highlight of their summer tour was a clash with multiple time All Asia Tag Team Champions Doug Furnas and Dan Kroffat which the Wrecking Crew lost.

In 1997, they toured Puerto Rico.

=== Return to WCW (1998-2000) ===
Green performed in WCW during the late 1990s, mainly on low level programs like WCW Saturday Night. On August 31, 1998 he faced Goldberg in a losing effort in the co-main event of WCW Monday Nitro. While doing guest commentary, Kevin Nash made reference to Green being a former tag team partner of his (also making a pun of his name, relating to the more famous singer Al Green). In 2000, he was repackaged as "The Dog" when he formed a hardcore tag team managed by Fit Finlay with former Nasty Boy Brian Knobs. Green's mannerisms in this gimmick were those of a stereotypical attack dog and would have habits not unlike dogs, including drinking from the toilet. He was a last minute replacement in their group for Sabu, who could not start for WCW due to contract issues. He only had five victories over Mike Sanders, Glacier, Damian (twice) and Evan Karagias. Upon the acquisition of WCW by the World Wrestling Federation in early 2001, Green's contract was one of the assets not taken.

=== Later career (2000-2007) ===
Green made appearances for the short lived WXO in 2000 under a mask and other Florida independent promotions. He retired from wrestling in 2001. Six years later, on April 27, 2007 Green made a one night appearance against Abdullah the Butcher at Memphis Wrestling's PMG Clash of Legends where the match ended in a no contest. Green's last television appearances were as a guest on the reality shows Hogan Knows Best and Brooke Knows Best on VH1.

== Death ==
Green died on June 14, 2013, at the age of 57. He had been suffering from COPD for some time before his death.

== Championships and accomplishments ==
- Catch Wrestling Association
  - CWA World Tag Team Championship (1 time) – with Fury
- Championship Wrestling from Florida
  - NWA Florida Tag Team Championship (1 time) – with The Terminator
- High Voltage Wrestling
  - HVW Heavyweight Championship (1 time)
- International Championship Wrestling Association
  - ICWA Tag Team Championship (3 times) – with The Terminator
- International Wrestling Federation (Florida version)
  - IWF Tag Team Championship (1 time) – with Fury
- Pro Wrestling Federation
  - PWF Tag Team Championship (1 time) – with The Terminator
- Windy City Pro Wrestling
  - WCPW Tag Team Championship (1 time) – with Fury
