= The Terminator (wrestler) =

American professional wrestler

The Terminator/Wrecking Crew
Personal information
- Born: Marcus Laurinaitis; February 21, 1965 (age 61) Philadelphia, Pennsylvania, U.S.
- Spouse: Beth Bartlett
- Family: John Laurinaitis (brother); Road Warrior Animal (brother); James Laurinaitis (nephew)

Professional wrestling career
- Ring name(s): Fury; The Terminator
- Billed height: 6 ft 1 in (1.85 m)
- Billed weight: 270 lb (120 kg; 19 st)
- Trained by: Road Warrior Animal; John Laurinaitis; Nelson Royal; Gene Anderson; Ric Flair; Dusty Rhodes
- Debut: 1987
- Retired: 1998

Marcus Laurinaitis (born February 21, 1965) is an American retired professional wrestler, better known by his ring names The Terminator and Fury from the tag team the Wrecking Crew. He wrestled primarily in Florida (FCW), Japan (All Japan Pro Wrestling and New Japan Pro-Wrestling), and Europe (CWA), as well as with World Championship Wrestling (WCW). He is the brother of fellow professional wrestlers John Laurinaitis and Road Warrior Animal.

== Professional wrestling career ==
Laurinaitis made his debut in 1987 after being trained by his brothers Joseph and John, as well as by Gene Anderson and Nelson Royal, and initially worked for Dusty Rhodes in Texas for a new NWA under the name The Terminator. He joined Devastation Incorporated managed by Skandor Akbar and tagged with The Angel of Death and Black Bart. He made a run with The Fabulous Freebirds, Sting, Rick Steiner and the Brad Armstrong & Tim Horner tag team. One of his earliest encounters with the Fabulous Freebirds was at the New Orleans Superdome in a First Blood cage match where The Terminator was one of the last to survive the blood bath until Terry Gordy eventually defeated him. In November and December 1987, Laurinaitis toured with All Japan Pro Wrestling. While in Japan, he teamed up with Tom Zenk to participate in the 1987 version of the World's Strongest Tag Determination League where he competed against such teams as Jumbo Tsuruta and Yoshiaki Yatsu (the winners), Jimmy Snuka and Bruiser Brody, The Great Kabuki and John Tenta, and Terry and Dory Funk, Jr. The Terminator and Zenk finished in 11th place only ahead of Mark and Chris Youngblood.

After the tour, Laurinaitis returned to Florida where he participated in a tournament to crown a new NWA Florida Heavyweight Championship, losing in the final to Mike Graham. When Laurinaitis returned, he also teamed up with his brother Johnny to challenge for the NWA Florida Tag Team Championship chasing the champions Mike Graham and Steve Keirn until September 20, 1988, when the Laurinaitis brothers won the gold. Marcus and Johnny defended the titles for over three months until they came across Florida newcomers The Nasty Boys (Jerry Sags and Brian Knobs) who took the gold from them. The brothers would come back strong only three weeks later to regain their gold and hold on to it until March 24, 1989, where the Nasty Boys once again beat them for the gold. During their second run with the gold, Marcus and Johnny also toured with All Japan Pro Wrestling as a team. Shortly afterwards, Johnny Ace left Florida Championship Wrestling to compete in Jim Crockett Promotions as one of the Dynamic Dudes (with Shane Douglas). The team known as the Bounty Hunters won the Florida tag team titles in November, but when one of the Bounty Hunters was injured, Laurinaitis stepped in and teamed up with the other Bounty Hunter to defend the tag team titles. The team held the gold until the Nasty Boys beat them on a card in Nassau, Bahamas, on January 6, 1990.

=== The Wrecking Crew ===
While competing in Florida, Laurinaitis ended up teaming with Al Green (who was known as The Bounty Hunter), initially as a makeshift team because Green's other partner got injured, but soon the two started teaming regularly, first under the name The Terminators then later on as The Wrecking Crew where Laurinaitis became known as Fury and Green was renamed Rage. The team competed for the International Wrestling Federation based in Florida showing themselves to be a force in the tag team division. On May 28, 1992, the duo beat IWF Tag Team Champions The Long Riders (Brett Colt and Kip Winchester). By late 1992, the Wrecking Crew got signed by World Championship Wrestling, making their debut in January 1993. Shortly after their debut, the Wrecking Crew got national exposure by competing at Clash of the Champions XXII on January 13, where they defeated Tom Zenk and Johnny Gunn. After their success at Clash of the Champions XXII, the team rode on a wave of success defeating Gunn and Zenk repeatedly as well as looking impressive against temporary teams such as 2 Cold Scorpio & Johnny B. Badd and Marcus Bagwell & Joey Maggs. By March, the team was contesting a series of matches with future WCW World Tag Team Champions 2 Cold Scorpio and Marcus Alexander Bagwell as well as feuding with the identical twin duo known as The Cole Twins (Keith and Kent Cole). The feud with the Cole Twins was soon expanded to also include Bagwell and Scorpio, as well as Tex Slazenger and Shanghai Pierce. As the feud wore on, the Cole Twins got the upper hand in the feud over the two big men. The Wrecking Crew also faced Cactus Jack and The Barbarian in a series of house show matches. As summer turned to fall, the Wrecking Crew's time with WCW ended, returning to the independent scene. In 1994, the Wrecking Crew traveled to Europe to work for Otto Wanz' Catch Wrestling Association. On July 24, they defeated David Finlay and John Hawk in the finals of a tournament to crown new CWA Tag Team Champions after Larry Cameron had died during a match. Rage & Fury held the belts for only three weeks before being unseated by CWA regulars August Smisl and Ulf Herman in Vienna, Austria. The Wrecking Crew also worked in South Africa at this time for promoter Paul Lloyd touring through Johannesburg, Durban and Cape Town. In 1995, the Wrecking Crew toured with All Japan Pro Wrestling over the summer being put over young teams like Kentaro Shiga and Maunakea Mossman. The highlight of their summer tour was a clash with multiple time All Asia Tag Team Champions Doug Furnas and Dan Kroffat which the Wrecking Crew lost.

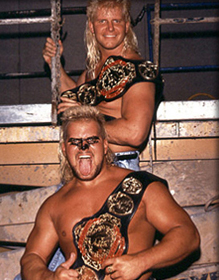
Johnny Ace and Terminator - FCW Tag Team Champions

== Championships and accomplishments ==
- Catch Wrestling Association
  - CWA World Tag Team Championship (1 time) - with Rage
- International Championship Wrestling Association
  - ICWA Tag Team Championship (3 times) - with Al Green
- International Wrestling Association
  - IWA Tag Team Championship (2 times) - Sunny Beach and Rage
- International Wrestling Federation
  - IWF Tag Team Championship (1 time) - with Rage
- Championship Wrestling from Florida
  - NWA Florida Tag Team Championship (3 times) - with Johnny Ace (2) and the Bounty Hunter (1)
  - NWA Florida Heavyweight Championship (1 time)
- Pro Wrestling Federation
  - PWF Tag Team Championship (1 time) - with the Bounty Hunter
- Windy City Pro Wrestling
  - WCPW Tag Team Championship (1 time) - with Rage
