= Charles Osei Asibey =

Ghanaian journalist

1st President of Africa Armwrestling Federation
- In office July 2022 – Present

Personal details
- Born: 7 November 1974 (age 51) Accra, Ghana

Charles Osei Asibey "The Barrister" is the president of the Africa Armwrestling Federation and the vice president of the World Armwrestling Federation. He was voted into office as the president of the federation in July 2022. He is a retired broadcast journalist who is also the founder and current president of the Ghana Armwrestling Federation. He also doubles as the general secretary of the Sports Writers Association of Ghana (SWAG). He is also the former communications director for the Ghana Olympic Committee.

He founded the Ghana Armwrestling Federation in September 2016 and was elected General Secretary of SWAG in October 2019.

In November 2019 Osei Asibey honoured as best Sports Administrator in United States of America by 3G Media as the Best Sports Administrator for 2019. He has almost 3 decades experience of broadcast work with Radio Gold, Groove FM now Adom FM, Peace FM, Happy FM and Asempa FM.

In July 2018 the president of the Ghana Olympic Committee Ben Nunoo Mensah commended Osei Asibey as leader of the Ghana Armwrestling Federation on his efforts to make the sport popular in Ghana.

Ghana President Nana Akufo-Addo commended Charles Osei Asibey for his contribution to sports development during his victory speech after winning the 2016 General Elections in Ghana.
