= Australian Armwrestling Federation =

Sports governing body in Australia

- Sport: Arm wrestling
- Jurisdiction: Australia
- Abbreviation: AAF
- Founded: 2011
- Affiliation: WAF
- Affiliation date: 2011
- Headquarters: Melbourne, Victoria
- President: Phil Rasmussen
- Vice president: Andrew Lea
- Secretary: Andrew Manfre
- Sponsor: Muscle Coach Supplements

Official website
- www.armwrestlingaustralia.com
- Other key staff: Amy Kauler, Duan Beckett, Ryan Scott, Tom Ugljesa
- (Australia)

Australian Armwrestling Federation is the governing body for the sport of Arm wrestling in Australia.

== History ==
The Australian Armwrestling Federation is an organisation dedicated to the growth of the exciting sport of armwrestling within Australia. With the primary aim of achieving mainstream recognition and the status of a true strength sport, the organisation is working constantly to hold and promote armwrestling competitions of the highest possible level throughout Australia.

== Structure ==
The national body has eight state member associations:

== See also ==
- Amateur wrestling in Australia
- Professional wrestling in Australia
