= Game of Arms =

2014 American reality TV series

- Genre: Reality
- Country of origin: United States
- Original language: English
- No. of seasons: 1
- No. of episodes: 10

Production
- Executive producers: Dan Ilani; Ethan Prochnik; Matt Renner
- Production company: Undertow Films

Original release
- Network: AMC
- Release: February 25 – April 29, 2014

Game of Arms is an American television series that debuted February 25, 2014, on AMC. The series is a reality television show about American competitive arm wrestlers. The series follows arm wrestling clubs in Erie, Pennsylvania; Kansas City, Missouri; New York City; Sacramento, California, and Baton Rouge, Louisiana. Prior to its broadcast, the series was initially known as King of Arms.

On September 11, 2014, AMC renewed the series for a second season. However it canceled the series a month later in mid-production as part of the network ending nearly all their reality series and refocusing completely on fictional dramas for their original series output.

== Episodes ==
No.	Title	Original release date	U.S. viewers (millions)
1	"The Battle Begins..."	February 25, 2014	1.00
2	"Southern Inhospitality"	March 4, 2014	N/A
3	"The Cold War"	March 11, 2014	N/A
4	"Bloodlines"	March 18, 2014	N/A
5	"Welcome to the Slaughterhouse"	March 25, 2014	N/A
6	"End of the line"	April 1, 2014	N/A
7	"Playing Hurt"	April 8, 2014	N/A
8	"War Horses"	April 15, 2014	N/A
9	"Battle for the Belt"	April 22, 2014	N/A
10	"Final Showdown"	April 29, 2014	N/A

== Reception ==
Upon airing, the premiere was watched by 1 million viewers, with 626,000 of those viewers among adults 18-49. It is AMC's highest-rated reality series premiere of all time.
