= Ghana Armwrestling Federation =

National federation

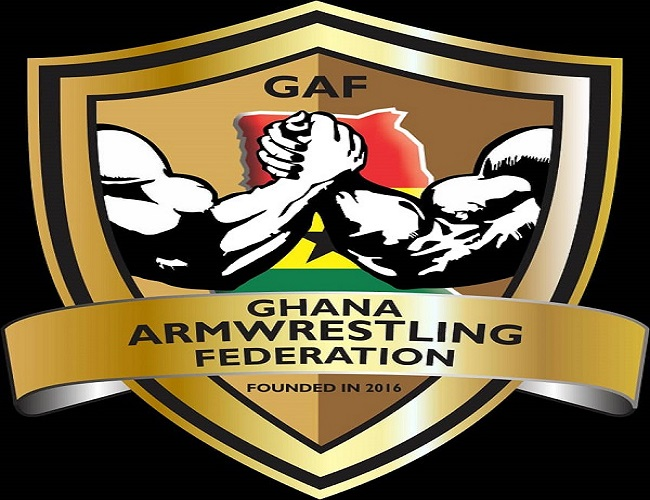
- Abbreviation: GAF
- Formation: 2016
- Type: Sports organization
- Headquarters: Accra, Ghana
- Official language: English
- President: Charles Osei Asibey
- Website: armwrestlingghana.com

The Ghana Armwrestling Federation (GAF) is the national federation in charge of regulating armwrestling in Ghana. The Ghana Armwrestling Federation was inaugurated in September 2016. The federation was founded by broadcast journalist Charles Osei Asibey and inaugurated in September 2016 by the National Sports Authority as the 40th sporting federation in Ghana. The Ghana Armwrestling Federation is affiliated to the World Armwrestling Federation and has been a member of the international body since 2016. Charles Osei Asibey is the President of the Ghana Armwrestling Federation. Husseini Akueteh is the head referee of the Ghana Armwrestling Federation.

Ghana's National Sports Authority recognised the Ghana Armwrestling Federation as the 40th sporting federation to be solely responsible for the development and promotion of armwrestling in Ghana.

In September 2019 the federation marked its third anniversary. In February 2020 the federation was courted by the Africa Armwrestling Federation to host the 2020 edition of the African championship after South Africa lost the rights to host due to administrative lapses to host a successful event. In April 2019 the federation announced that African championship which was slated for summer 2020 had been suspended due to the Coronavirus pandemic.

Ghana hosted and won the 2018 edition of the championship with 31 gold, 32 silver and 25 bronze medals with a grand total of 88 medals. The Ghana armwrestling national team is referred to as the golden arms.

== Armwrestling Champions in Ghana ==
National champions (Male)
Armwrestler	Nickname
Haruna Tahiru	Babs Don
Derrick Adu Kwakye	Asoka
Antwi Boasiako	Punisher
Fawzi George Saaud	The King

National champions (Female)
Armwrestler	Nickname
Yasmin Kadri Moro	N/A
Bambie Bamfo	N/A
Alberta Boatemaa Ampomah	N/A

In December 2019 the Minister responsible for the Ministry of Youth and Sports (Ghana) Isaac Kwame Asiamah commended the Ghana Armwrestling Federation for their contribution to sports development in the country.

In January 2020 16-year old arm wrestler Mariam Kadri Moro defeated the undefeated police woman Alberta Ampomah Boatemaa to become the new Queen of armwrestlering in Ghana. In July 2018 President of the Ghana Olympic Committee (GOC), Ben Nunoo Mensah commended the Ghana Armwrestling Federation for their efforts to making the sport popular in Ghana.
