= World Armwrestling Championship =

World Armwrestling Championships is the main arm wrestling championship in the World. It is organized by the World Armwrestling Federation, founded in 1977. The first WAF World Armwrestling was hosted by John Miazdzyk in Wetaskiwin, Alberta, Canada, in 1979.

== Events ==
Medals are awarded separately for right and left hands in every weight class and age groups. Age groups in 2019 included Sub-Junior (ages 14-15), Juniors (up to 18), Youth (21) Senior (adults), Masters (above 40), Grand Masters (above 50) and Senior Grand Masters (above 60). The Senior weight classes in 2019:

Men	Women
–55 kg	–50 kg
60 kg	55 kg
65 kg	60 kg
70 kg	65 kg
75 kg	70 kg
80 kg	80 kg
85 kg	90 kg
90 kg	+90 kg
100 kg	
110 kg	
+110 kg	

== Championships ==
=== Women's champions ===
Year (Note: The absence of some years reflects gaps in the available historical transcriptions, rather than proof that no women's competition took place.) (Note: The 1978, 1984 and 2020 World Championships were not held.)	City	Country	Women's right-hand champion (Note: The women's weight categories changed over the years. The heaviest recorded category was +69 kg in 1979, 90 kg in 1980, +80 kg in 1981–1983, +60 kg in the 1985 archive, and 85 kg in 1986. The heaviest category was generally +80 kg from 1987 to 2018, before increasing to +90 kg in 2019.)	Women's left-hand champion	Reference
1979 (Note: The 1979, 1980 and 1986 championships are described in the archive as sit-down WAWF World Championships. Their results may therefore not be directly comparable with later standing competitions.)	Wetaskiwin	Canada	Pam Carter (+69 kg)	— (Note: A dash (—) indicates that the archival results used here do not list a winner for that hand. It does not necessarily mean that the competition was not held.)	
1980	Calcutta	India	Aileen Motz (United States; 90 kg)	—	
1981	Brasília	Brazil	Mariene Ambrozini (Brazil; +80 kg)	—	
1982	Syracuse, New York	United States	Brenda Massena (+80 kg)	—	
1983	San José, Costa Rica	Costa Rica	Florence Obniawka (+80 kg)	—	
1985	Mexico City	Mexico	Stella Avanzini (Italy; +60 kg) (Note: The 1985 archival results only list women's categories up to +60 kg. This may reflect incomplete historical records and should not necessarily be interpreted as the maximum category available at the championship.)	Wendy Rowland (Canada; +60 kg)	
1986	Calcutta	India	Aysia Meher (India; 85 kg)	— (Note: The 1986 results record a women's right-hand 85 kg category, but no women's left-hand result.)	
1987	London	England	Marcelita Manning (England; +80 kg)	Kathy Riley (United States; 80 kg)	
1988	Eskilstuna	Sweden	Maristella Avanzini (Italy; +80 kg)	—	
1989	Athens	Greece	Flo Obniwaka (Canada; +80 kg)	—	
1990	Houston	United States	Carolyn Liebel (United States; +80 kg)	—	
1993	Edmonton	Canada	Heitje VanArendenk (+80 kg)	Rose Jowsey (Canada; +80 kg)	
1994	Södertälje	Sweden	Liane Dufresne (Canada; +80 kg)	Liane Dufresne (Canada; +80 kg)	
1995	Campinas	Brazil	Vika Gabagkova (Russia; +80 kg)	Vika Gabakova (Russia; +80 kg) (Note: The spelling of some athletes' names varies between historical records. In particular, the name Vika Gabakova is also transcribed as Vika Gabagkova, and Liliya Khamidullina as Lilia Khamidoullina.)	
1996	Virginia Beach	United States	Vika Gabagkova (Russia; +80 kg)	Vika Gabagkova (Russia; +80 kg)	
1997	Guwahati	India	Vika Gabagkova (Russia; +80 kg)	Vika Gabagkova (Russia; +80 kg)	
2002	Springfield, Illinois	United States	Vika Gabagkova (+80 kg)	Lilia Khamidoullina (Russia; +80 kg)	
2004	Durban	South Africa	Lilia Khamidoullina (+80 kg)	Mirela Pirjol (+80 kg)	
2005	Tokyo	Japan	—	Liliya Khamidullina (+80 kg)	
2006	Manchester	England	Liliya Khamidullina (+80 kg)	Liliya Khamidullina (+80 kg)	
2007	Veliko Tarnovo	Bulgaria	Zhanna Chingule (Latvia; +80 kg)	Svetlana Tikhonova (Russia; +80 kg)	
2008	Kelowna	Canada	—	Nurcihan Gonul (+80 kg)	
2009	Rosolina	Italy	—	Nurcihan Gonul (+80 kg)	
2015	Kuala Lumpur	Malaysia	Antonina Lissyanskaya (Kazakhstan; +80 kg)	Antonina Lissyanskaya (Kazakhstan; +80 kg)	
2016	Blagoevgrad	Bulgaria	Eglė Vaitkutė (Lithuania; +80 kg)	Antonina Lissyanskaya (Kazakhstan; +80 kg)	
2017	Budapest	Hungary	Eglė Vaitkutė (Lithuania; +80 kg)	Antonina Lissyanskaya (Kazakhstan; +80 kg)	
2018	Antalya	Turkey	Antonina Lissyanskaya (Kazakhstan; +80 kg)	Eglė Vaitkutė (Lithuania; +80 kg)	
2019	Constanța	Romania	Barbora Bajčiová (Slovakia; +90 kg)	Madina Kairova (Russia; +90 kg)	
2021	Bucharest	Romania	Barbora Bajčiová (Slovakia; +90 kg)	Barbora Bajčiová (Slovakia; +90 kg)	
2022	Antalya	Turkey	Barbora Bajčiová (Slovakia; +90 kg)	Barbora Bajčiová (Slovakia; +90 kg)	
2023	Almaty	Kazakhstan	Merve Yenidunya (Turkey; +90 kg)	Antonina Lissyanskaya (Kazakhstan; +90 kg)	
2024	Chișinău	Moldova	Barbora Bajčiová (Slovakia; +90 kg)	Barbora Bajčiová (Slovakia; +90 kg)	
2025	Albena	Bulgaria	Giulia Pari (Italy; +90 kg)	Malena Sydykzhan (Kazakhstan; +90 kg)	

=== Men's Champions ===
Edition	Year	City	Country	Champion men's right 90+ kg	Champion men's left 90+ kg	Ref
1st	1979	Wetaskiwin	Canada	Dan Mason (USA)	–	
2nd	1980	Kolkata	India	none	–	
3rd	1981	Brasília	Brazil	Mike Shadduck (USA)	–	
4th	1982	Syracuse	United States	Bob Hopkins (USA)	–	
5th	1983	San José	Costa Rica	Rick Baarbe (CAN)	–	
6th	1985	Mexico City	Mexico	Roger Payne (CAN)	–	
7th	1986	Kolkata	India	Jim Northern (USA)	–	
8th	1987	London	England	Gary Goodridge (CAN)	–	
9th	1988	Eskilstuna	Sweden	Richard Lupkes (USA)	–	
10th	1989	Athens	Greece	Sotiris Batsinilas (GRE)	–	
11th	1990	Houston	United States	Gary Goodridge (CAN)	–	
12th	1991	Netanya	Israel	Zaur Tskadadze (GEO)	–	
13th	1992	Geneva	Switzerland	Zaur Tskadadze (GEO)	–	
14th	1993	Edmonton	Canada	Gary Goodridge (CAN)	Gary Goodridge (CAN)	
15th	1994	Södertälje	Sweden	Zaur Tskadadze (GEO)	Cleve Dean (USA)	
16th	1995	Campinas	Brazil	Glauco Prior (BRA)	Aslanbek Yenaldiev (RUS)	
17th	1996	Virginia Beach	United States	Alan Karaev (RUS)	Eric Woelful (USA)	
18th	1997	Guwahati	India	Alan Karaev (RUS)	Alan Karaev (RUS)	
19th	1998	Thunder Bay	Canada	Glauco Prior (BRA)	Glauco Prior (BRA)	
20th	1999	Tokyo	Japan	Shigeki Kanai (JPN)	Mikel Gould (CAN)	
21st	2000	Rovaniemi	Finland	Dick Ivars (CAN)	Earl Wilson (CAN)	
22nd	2001	Gardone Riviera	Italy	?	Dagir Tebver (UZB)	
23rd	2002	Springfield	United States	Greg Boyes (CAN)	Ryan Espey (CAN)	
25th	2003	Ottawa	Canada	Travis Bagent (USA)	Ryan Espey (CAN)	
26th	2004	Durban	South Africa	Alexey Voevoda (RUS)	Alexey Voevoda (RUS)	
27th	2005	Tokyo	Japan	August Smisl (GER)	August Smisl (GER)	
28th	2006	Manchester	England	Nasir Khalikov (RUS)	Nasir Khalikov (RUS)	
29th	2007	Veliko Tarnovo	Bulgaria	Andriy Pushkar (UKR)	Farid Usmanov (UZB)	
30th	2008	Kelowna	Canada	Andriy Pushkar (UKR)	Andriy Pushkar (UKR)	
31st	2009	Rosolina	Italy	Andriy Pushkar (UKR)	Andriy Pushkar (UKR)	
32nd	2010	Mesquite	United States	Andriy Pushkar (UKR)	Andriy Pushkar (UKR)	
33rd	2011	Almaty	Kazakhstan	Andriy Pushkar (UKR)	Andriy Pushkar (UKR)	
34th	2012	São Vicente	Brazil	Andriy Pushkar (UKR)	Andriy Pushkar (UKR)	
35th	2013	Gdynia	Poland	Revaz Lutidze (GEO)	Juraj Michalička (SVK)	
36th	2014	Vilnius	Lithuania	Levan Saginashvili (GEO)	Levan Saginashvili (GEO)	
37th	2015	Kuala Lumpur	Malaysia	Genadi Kvikvinia (GEO)	Levan Saginashvili (GEO)	
38th	2016	Blagoevgrad	Bulgaria	Genadi Kvikvinia (GEO)	Levan Saginashvili (GEO)	
39th	2017	Budapest	Hungary	Dmitry Silaev (RUS)	Levan Saginashvili (GEO)	
40th	2018	Antalya	Turkey	Levan Saginashvili (GEO)	Levan Saginashvili (GEO)	
41st	2019	Constanţa	Romania	Arif Ertem (TUR)	Kody Merritt (USA)	
	2020	postponed due COVID-19 pandemic				
42nd	2021	Bucharest	Romania	Arif Ertem (TUR)	Georgi Tsvetkov (BUL)	
43nd	2022	Antalya	Turkey	Georgi Tsvetkov (BUL)	Alizhan Muratov (KAZ)	
44nd	2023	Almaty	Kazakhstan	Boris Gapchenko (KAZ)	Alizhan Muratov (KAZ)	
45th	2024	Chișinău	Moldova	Gabor Botta-Dukat (HUN)	Medet Kuttymuratov (KAZ)	
46th	2025	Albena	Bulgaria	Murat Efe Kömek (TUR)	Medet Kuttymuratov (KAZ)	
47th	2026	New Delhi	India	Boris Poska (RUS)	Beka Bogveradze (GEO)	
