= Levan Saginashvili =

Georgian professional arm-wrestler

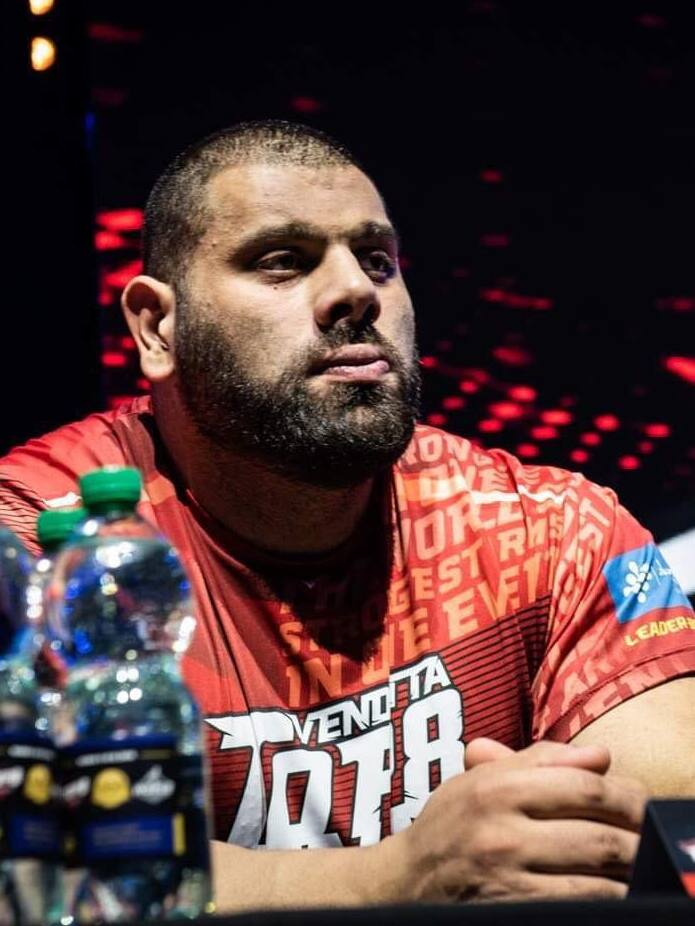
- Saginashvili in 2019

Personal information
- Nickname: The Georgian Hulk
- Nationality: Georgian
- Born: 15 September 1988 (age 38) Tbilisi, Georgia
- Height: 191 cm (6 ft 3 in)
- Weight: 180 kg (397 lb)

Sport
- Country: Georgia
- Sport: Arm wrestling

Levan Saginashvili (Georgian: ლევან საგინაშვილი), nicknamed the Georgian Hulk, is a Georgian professional arm-wrestler who was ranked number 1 in the world on the right hand, but announced at the East vs West 25 press conference that he is going to vacate his title. He is expecting to return in 2027. He was the winner of the World Armwrestling Championship seven times, the European arm-wrestling championship six times, the Vendetta Top 8 four times, and used to be the holder of the East vs West Super Heavyweight Championship.

== Career ==
After winning the 2013 World Police and Fire Games arm-wrestling gold medal in Belfast, Saginashvili was awarded the merit of first degree by the Ministry of Internal Affairs of Georgia.

In 2018 he won the EuroArm, World Arm-wrestling Championship, and Vendetta All Stars #50 in Rumia, Poland.

Saginashvili started arm-wrestling at the age of 20, after he was spotted working out at the gym.

On 20 April 2024, Saginashvili returned from a wrist injury to defeat rival arm-wrestler Devon Larratt for the East vs West Super Heavyweight championship.

== Acting ==
Levan appears in the 2021 historical drama film The Lady of Heaven, as well as the 2023 action film Extraction 2.

== Tournaments/Notable matches ==
Year	Tournament	Place	Hand	Weight class
2025	East vs West 18 – Chicago, United States (21 June 2025) Levan Saginashvili 5 : 0 Ermes Gasparini	1st	Right Hand	Super Heavyweight
2024	King Of The Table 13 – New Jersey, United States (14 December 2024) Levan Saginashvili 4 : 0 Jerry Cadorette	1st	Right Hand	Super Heavyweight
2024	East vs West 12 – Istanbul, Turkey (20 April 2024) Levan Saginashvili 4 : 0 Devon Larratt	1st	Right Hand	Super Heavyweight
2023	King Of The Table 6 – Dubai, United Arab Emirates (25 February 2023) Levan Saginashvili 4 : 2 Ermes Gasparini	1st	Right Hand	Super Heavyweight
2022	King Of The Table 4 – Dubai, United Arab Emirates (25 June 2022) Levan Saginashvili 6 : 0 Devon Larratt	1st	Right Hand	Super Heavyweight
2021	Vendetta Top 8 – Kyiv, Ukraine (5 September 2021) Levan Saginashvili 6 : 0 Dave Chaffee	1st	Right Hand	105 kg+
2019	Zloty Tur & Vendetta Top 8 – Rumia, Poland (8 December 2019) Levan Saginashvili 6 : 0 Vitaly Laletin	1st	Right Hand	105 kg+
2019	Vendetta Top 8 – Shenzhen, China (14 September 2019) Levan Saginashvili 6 : 0 Kydyrgali Ongarbaev	1st	Right Hand	105 kg+
2019	Vendetta Top 8 – Kuching, Malaysia (5 April 2019) Levan Saginashvili 6 : 0 Tim Bresnan	1st	Right Hand	105 kg+
2018	Vendetta – All Stars #50 – Rumia, Poland (18 November 2018) Levan Saginashvili 6 : 0 Dmitry Trubin	1st	Right Hand	105 kg+
2018	World Armwrestling Championships 2018 (WAF) – Antalya, Turkey	1st	Left Hand	Senior Men 110 kg+
2018	World Armwrestling Championships 2018 (WAF) – Antalya, Turkey	1st	Right Hand	Senior Men 110 kg+
2018	Euroarm 2018 – Sofia, Bulgaria	1st	Left Hand	Senior Men 110 kg+
2018	Euroarm 2018 – Sofia, Bulgaria	1st	Right Hand	Senior Men 110 kg+
2017	Zloty Tur – Rumia, Poland	1st	Left Hand	Senior Men 110 kg+
2017	Zloty Tur – Rumia, Poland	1st	Right Hand	Senior Men 110 kg+
2017	World Armwrestling Championships 2017 (WAF) – Budapest, Hungary	1st	Left Hand	Senior Men 110 kg+
2017	World Armwrestling Championships 2017 (WAF) – Budapest, Hungary	5th	Right Hand	Senior Men 110 kg+
2017	Euroarm 2017 – Katowice, Poland	1st	Left Hand	Senior Men 110 kg+
2017	Euroarm 2017 – Katowice, Poland	1st	Right Hand	Senior Men 110 kg+
2016	World Armwrestling Championships 2016 (WAF) – Blagoevgrad, Bulgaria	1st	Left Hand	Senior Men 110 kg+
2016	World Armwrestling Championships 2016 (WAF) – Blagoevgrad, Bulgaria	2nd	Right Hand	Senior Men 110 kg+
2016	Euroarm 2016 – Bucharest, Romania	1st	Left Hand	Senior Men 110 kg+
2016	Euroarm 2016 – Bucharest, Romania	4th	Right Hand	Senior Men 110 kg+
2015	World Armwrestling Championships 2015 (WAF) – Kuala Lumpur, Malaysia	1st	Left Hand	Senior Men 110 kg+
2015	World Armwrestling Championships 2015 (WAF) – Kuala Lumpur, Malaysia	2nd	Right Hand	Senior Men 110 kg+
2014	World Armwrestling Championships 2014 (WAF) – Vilnius, Lithuania	1st	Left Hand	Senior Men 110 kg+
2014	World Armwrestling Championships 2014 (WAF) – Vilnius, Lithuania	1st	Right Hand	Senior Men 110 kg+
2014	Euroarm 2014 – Baku, Azerbaijan	6th	Left Hand	Senior Men 110 kg+
2014	Euroarm 2014 – Baku, Azerbaijan	2nd	Right Hand	Senior Men 110 kg+
2014	Georgian National Armwrestling Championship – Tbilisi, Georgia	1st	Left Hand	Senior Men 100 kg+
2014	Georgian National Armwrestling Championship – Tbilisi, Georgia	1st	Right Hand	Senior Men 100 kg+
2013	World Armwrestling Championships 2013 (WAF) – Gdynia, Poland	4th	Left Hand	Senior Men 110 kg+
2013	World Armwrestling Championships 2013 (WAF) – Gdynia, Poland	9th	Right Hand	Senior Men 110 kg+
2013	Georgian National Armwrestling Championship – Tbilisi, Georgia	2nd	Left Hand	Senior Men 100 kg+
2013	Georgian National Armwrestling Championship – Tbilisi, Georgia	3rd	Right Hand	Senior Men 100 kg+
2012	Georgian National Armwrestling Championship – Tbilisi, Georgia	2nd	Left Hand	Senior Men 100 kg+
2012	Georgian National Armwrestling Championship – Tbilisi, Georgia	2nd	Right Hand	Senior Men 100 kg+
