= Andriy Pushkar =

Ukrainian athlete (1985–2018)

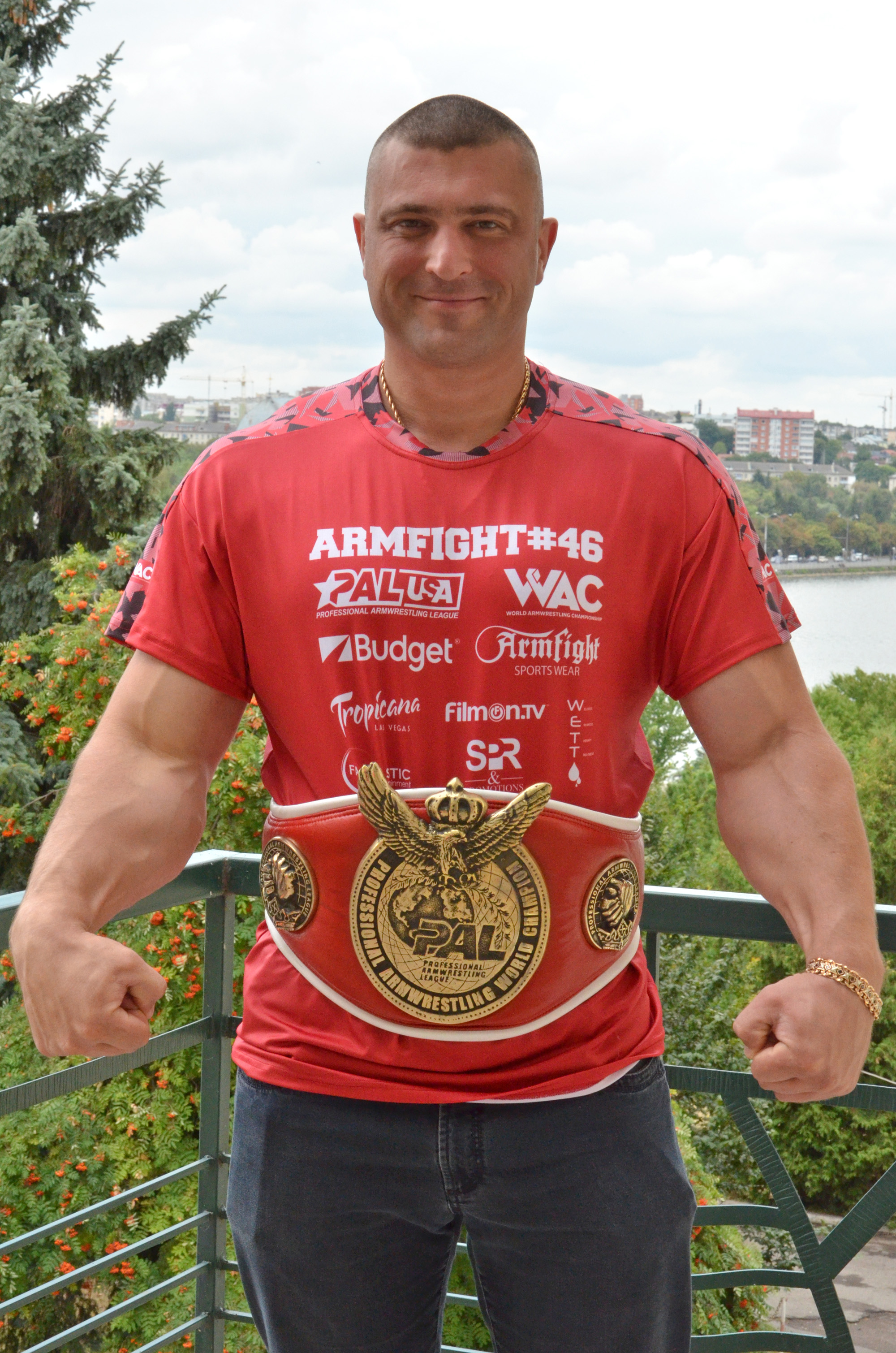
- Born: Andriy Pushkar; August 6, 1985; Kremenets, Ukraine
- Died: November 14, 2018 (aged 33); Radyvyliv Raion, Ukraine
- Other name: Andrii Pushkar
- Education: Fakulʹtet Obliku I Audytu Ternopil
- Occupations: Arm wrestler, bodybuilder
- Height: 1.92 m (6 ft 4 in)
- Spouse: Svitlana Pushkar
- Children: 1

Andriy Anatoliyovych Pushkar (Ukrainian: Андрій Анатолійович Пушкар; August 6, 1985 – November 14, 2018), also known as Andrii Pushkar or Andrey Pushkar, was a Ukrainian professional arm wrestler and bodybuilder. He is widely considered as one of the greatest armwrestlers of all time. He won the World Armwrestling Championship a record eleven times in both right and left hand.

== Early life ==
Andriy Pushkar was born in the city of Kremenets, Ukraine on August 6, 1985. When he was 11-years old, he saw the movie Commando with Arnold Schwarzenegger and decided to become an athlete. In 2007, Pushkar won in the heavyweight division of arm wrestling competition where he took his first world championship medal.

== Death ==
On November 14, 2018, while driving with Oleg Zhokh and Oleg's father in the Rivne region, Andriy Pushkar was killed in a traffic collision. Oleg became comatose and Oleg's father died. According to the media report, the Ukrainian athlete from Ostroh District was the driver of a Citroën. He lost control of the car due to oncoming traffic and collided with a truck. The accident occurred on a highway between the villages of Hai-Leviatynski and Krupets.
