= World Armwrestling Federation =

Sports organization

- Membership: 82 countries
- Abbreviation: WAF
- Founded: 1977
- Headquarters: Sofia, Bulgaria
- President: Assen Hadjitodorov

Official website
- waf-armwrestling.com

The World Armwrestling Federation (WAF) is an international federation of national and regional arm wrestling associations. Currently, WAF has members from 82 countries.

== WAF members ==
Association	Continent	Website
Afghanistan	Asia	N/A
Albania	Europe	N/A
Argentina	South America	luchadebrazos.com.ar
Armenia	Europe	N/A
Australia	Oceania	www.armwrestlingaustralia.com
Austria	Europe	N/A
Azerbaijan	Europe	aqgf.az
Belarus	Europe	N/A
Belgium	Europe	N/A
Bolivia	South America	N/A
(Bosnia and Herzegovina) Bosnia	Europe	N/A
Brazil	South America	cblbh.com.br
Bulgaria	Europe	www.armfight.com
Cameroon	Africa	N/A
Canada	North America	www.cawf.ca
China	Asia	c-armwrestling.org
Chile	South America	N/A
Colombia	South America	N/A
Costa Rica	North America	N/A
Croatia	Europe	obaranje-ruke.hr
Czech Republic	Europe	www.armwrestling.cz
Denmark	Europe	N/A
Dominican Republic	North America	N/A
Egypt	Africa	N/A
(United Kingdom) England	Europe	armwrestling.co.uk
Estonia	Europe	www.armwrestling.ee
Finland	Europe	www.skvl.net
France	Europe	www.ffforce.fr
(Georgia (country)) Georgia	Europe	N/A
Germany	Europe	armwrestling.de
Ghana	Africa	armwrestlinggh.com
Greece	Europe	N/A
Greenland	Europe	N/A
Hungary	Europe	magyarszkander.hu
Hong Kong, China	Asia	armwrestling.org.hk
Iceland	Europe	N/A
India	Asia	pafi.co.in
Indonesia	Asia	N/A
Iran	Asia	N/A
Iraq	Asia	N/A
Israel	Europe	www.powerhand.co.il
Italy	Europe	www.bracciodiferroitalia.it
Japan	Asia	www.japan-arm.jp

Association	Continent	Website
Kazakhstan	Asia	N/A
South Korea	Asia	armwrestling.kr
Kyrgyzstan	Asia	N/A
Latvia	Europe	armwrestling.lv
Lebanon	Europe	N/A
Lithuania	Europe	N/A
Malaysia	Asia	N/A
Mali	Africa	N/A
Mexico	North America	N/A
Moldova	Europe	N/A
Mongolia	Asia	N/A
Morocco	Africa	N/A
Nepal	Asia	N/A
Netherlands	Europe	N/A
New Zealand	Oceania	www.nzarmwrestling.co.nz
Nigeria	Africa	www.nigeriaarmwrestling.org.
Norway	Europe	www.bryting.no/handbak/
Poland	Europe	N/A
Pakistan	Asia	www.paffederation.com
Palestine	Asia	N/A
Romania	Europe	www.bratdefier.ro
Russia	Europe	armwrestling-rus.ru
Scotland	Europe	N/A
Serbia	Europe	N/A
Singapore	Asia	N/A
Slovakia	Europe	armsport.sk
South Africa	Africa	N/A
Spain	Europe	N/A
Sweden	Europe	N/A
Switzerland	Europe	www.armsport.ch
Syria	Asia	N/A
Chinese Taipei	Asia	www.facebook.com/Ironauditt18
Tajikistan	Asia	N/A
Tunisia	Africa	N/A
Turkey	Europe	www.tvgfbf.com/tr
Turkmenistan	Asia	N/A
Uganda	Africa	N/A
Ukraine	Europe	www.armsport.com.ua
United Arab Emirates	Asia	N/A
United States	North America	www.theusaf.com
Uzbekistan	Asia	N/A

== World Armwrestling Championships ==
World Armwrestling Federation (WAF) is the international governing organization for the sport of arm wrestling, established in 1977. WAF is WADA Code Compliant. The WAF is the main organizer of the World Armwrestling Championships, which is held every year. Official programme has 36 events for senior athletes.
