= August Smisl =

Austrian wrestler

Personal information
- Born: 19 February 1968 (age 58) Graz, Austria

Professional wrestling career
- Ring name(s): August Smisl; Joseph August
- Billed height: 1.93 m (6 ft 4 in)
- Billed weight: 133 kg (293 lb)
- Trained by: Otto Wanz
- Debut: 1992
- Retired: 1998

August Smisl (born 19 February 1968) is an Austrian retired professional wrestler, who spent his whole career in Catch Wrestling Association in Germany in the 1990s.

== Professional wrestling career ==
Smisl had a background in judo where he won three silver and two bronze medals from 1985 to 1993. He would make his debut in 1992 for Catch Wrestling Association in Germany after being trained by Austrian wrestler Otto Wanz.

In 1994, Smisl won the CWA World Tag Team Championship with Ulf Herman as they held the titles for 446 days. Smisl also won the titles again with Herman in 1996 and Tony St. Clair in 1995.

In 1996, Smisl won the Catch Cup in Graz where he defeated Maxx Payne in the finals.

Smisl fought in a match for the WWF in the DX in Germany Tour losing to Bradshaw.

Smisl retired from wrestling at the end of 1998.

Smisl returned for one match on 23 September 2002, teaming with Tony St. Clair as they defeated Salvatore Bellomo and Colonel Brody for EWP Gilde Wrestling Festival 2002 in Hanover, Germany.

== Mixed martial arts career ==
Smisl fought only one match in MMA on 16 May 1996, in Tokyo, Japan losing to Masakatsu Funaki at Pancrase: Truth 5 by submission with a rear naked choke in round 1.

== Personal life ==
Smisl owns a gym in Bremen, Germany called Top Gym.

== Championships and accomplishments ==
- Catch Wrestling Association
  - Catch Cup (1996)
  - CWA World Tag Team Championship (3 times) - with Ulf Herman (2) and Tony St. Clair (1)

== Mixed martial arts record ==
Professional record breakdown
1 match	0 wins	1 loss
By submission	0	1

Res.	Record	Opponent	Method	Event	Date	Round	Time	Location	Notes
Loss	0–1	Masakatsu Funaki	Submission (rear-naked choke)	Pancrase: Truth 5	May 16, 1996	1	2:01	Tokyo, Japan	
