= Arm wrestling =

Sport between two competitors

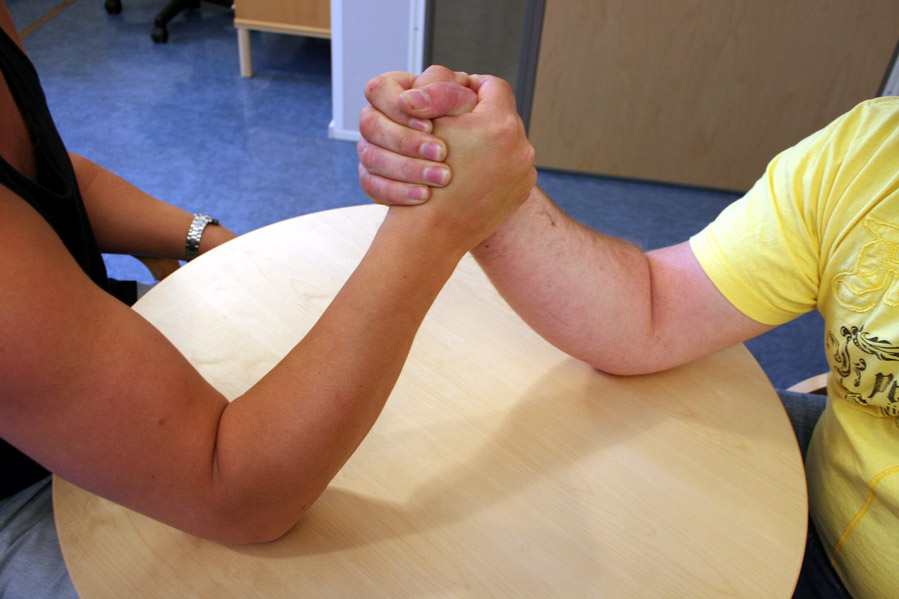
- Two individuals arm wrestling recreationally
- First played: c. 8th century CE

Characteristics
- Contact: Yes
- Team members: No
- Mixed-sex: No (competition)
- Equipment: Arm wrestling table, straps (competition)

Presence
- Country or region: International
- Olympic: No

Arm wrestling (also spelled "armwrestling") is a strength sport in which two participants, facing each other with their bent elbows placed on a flat surface (usually a table) and hands firmly gripped, each attempt to "pin" their opponent's hand by forcing it to the surface. In popular culture, arm wrestling is commonly interpreted as a display of physical dominance, symbolizing superior strength and toughness between two individuals.

== History ==
=== Early history ===
Current knowledge of the history of arm wrestling is based on written and pictorial evidentiary sources, and arm wrestling may have existed in any number of ancient or medieval cultures that did not record it. The most popular claims that it was practiced in ancient Egypt or ancient Greece, while not necessarily implausible, are founded on misinterpretation of sources (confusing references to wrestling with the arms or images of wrestling with the hands or of dancing for arm wrestling).

Modern-day practices and depictions of arm wrestling have been widely practiced during the Edo-period of Japan (Japanese: 腕相撲, romanized: udezumō; formerly known as "wrist wrestling" in this context in English, the literal translation of the Japanese) depicted in art from as early as the 1700s, and recorded in writing as early as the eighth century in the Kojiki. Illustrations unambiguously demonstrate this was the same as modern arm wrestling. It is likely that the modern popularity of arm wrestling comes from the Japanese treatment of the sport.

Arm wrestling was also practiced by Spaniards and Cubans in the nineteenth century, possibly via the influence of Japanese contact; these arm-wrestlers would place a piece of money under each elbow.

Arm wrestling in the United States was formerly also called "Indian arm wrestling"; some sources suggest the practice originated amongst Native American peoples such as the Lenape. A similar sport, "Indian hand wrestling", attested from the early 20th century and commonly ascribed Native American origins, was conducted standing upright. Both "Indian arm wrestling" (or simply "arm wrestling") and "Indian hand wrestling" were popular among Boy Scouts and other American youth in the early to mid 20th century.

=== Contemporary era ===
The transition from informal arm wrestling matches to professionally organized competitions began in the 1950s. In late 1954, a "wristwrestling" challenge issued by Jack Homel at Mike Gilardi's bar in Petaluma, California, sparked local interest and led to the formation of a committee to organize a fundraising event for the March of Dimes. The first contest was held on 27 January 1955, and its success led to the establishment of an annual event that steadily grew in scale and popularity. In 1962, the sport was formalized with the creation of the World's Wristwrestling Championship, Inc., which hosted the first official World's Wristwrestling Championship on 2 February 1962. This marked a pivotal shift from informal local contests to structured, professional tournaments.

By the late 1960s, arm wrestling had gained national attention, with televised broadcasts on ABC's Wide World of Sports and references in popular culture, including a Peanuts comic strip by Charles Schulz.

The 1970s and 1980s are often considered the "golden age" of professional arm wrestling, characterized by increased media coverage and corporate sponsorships. The sport reached mainstream audiences with the release of Sylvester Stallone's 1987 film "Over the Top", which was inspired by real-life arm wrestling events. As the only major motion picture centered on the sport, it played a significant role in popularizing arm wrestling worldwide.

In the late 1990's and early 2000's, global expansion continued through the efforts of organizations such as the World Armwrestling Federation (WAF), and the World Armwrestling League (WAL). While arm wrestling's popularity did see modest growth during this time, it remained a niche sport. The 2009 documentary "Pulling John", chronicling the career of world champion arm wrestler John Brzenk, grew some interest, but fell short of pushing arm wrestling into the forefront to the extent that Over The Top had.

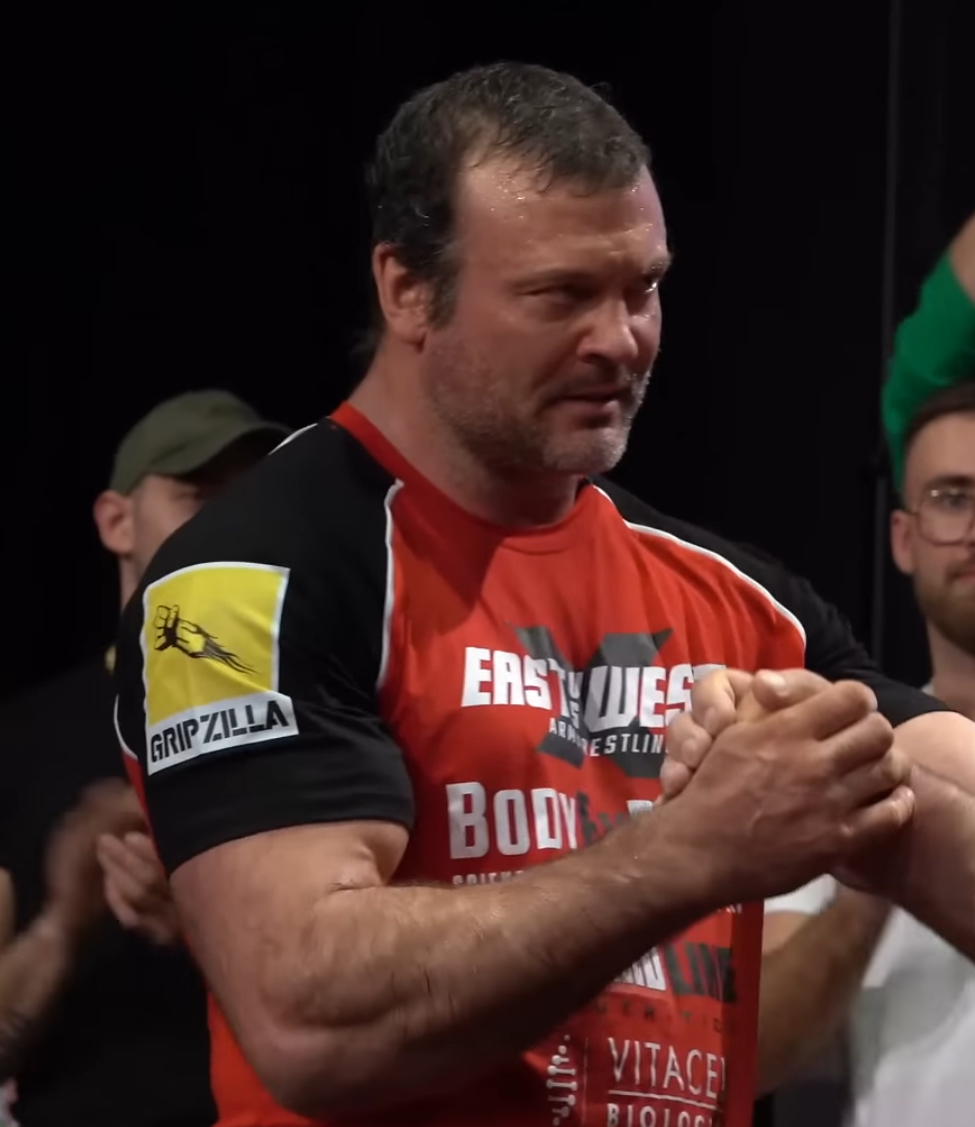
Devon Larratt

In the early 2020s, arm wrestling experienced a resurgence in popularity, partly due to widespread lockdowns during the COVID-19 pandemic. The rise of digital platforms played a major role, with athletes like Devon Larratt and Levan Saginashvili attracting millions of viewers through YouTube and social media.

Social media continues to be a driving force behind the sport's growth, with additional interest generated by established professional athletes crossing over from other disciplines to train for and compete in arm wrestling events. There is a growing movement to have arm wrestling included in the Olympic Games. In popular culture, arm wrestling remains a symbolic contest of physical dominance, often representing strength, toughness, and personal resolve between two individuals.

== Competitive structure ==
Most competitive arm wrestling governing bodies align on general principles within their rule sets, although there may be slight variations. Since there is no central governing body, rule sets must be agreed to prior to a tournament or match. Organized arm wrestling competitions are typically arranged in either tournament or supermatch format.

A tournament usually involves successive rounds of a single match (or "pull") between any two opponents and a large number of total participants. Most tournaments are double-elimination, meaning two losses will eliminate a competitor from the tournament. As with other strength sports in which body weight is recognized to play a significant role in victory, arm wrestling tournaments are usually divided along weight classes as well as left and right-handed divisions.

A "supermatch" usually involves a best three out of five matches, or best of four out of either six or seven matches between two specific athletes, with short rest periods between consecutive matches. The supermatch format is usually reserved for more experienced and high-level pullers. Supermatch format varies depending on the rule set utilized by the organizing body.

Recreational (not organized) arm wrestling typically adheres to the most fundamental principles, often taking place on any available flat surface, with the competitors either sitting or standing, and without specialized equipment or referees. Recreational matches run a higher risk of injury than competitive matches, as they do not follow weight or skill class requirements, do not take place on surfaces with standard positions or dimensions, and may take place between individuals of significantly different size, strength and skill levels. "Sit-down" arm wrestling, where competitors are seated at a table instead of standing, is a variant of arm wrestling that is more common in a recreational setting.

== Equipment ==
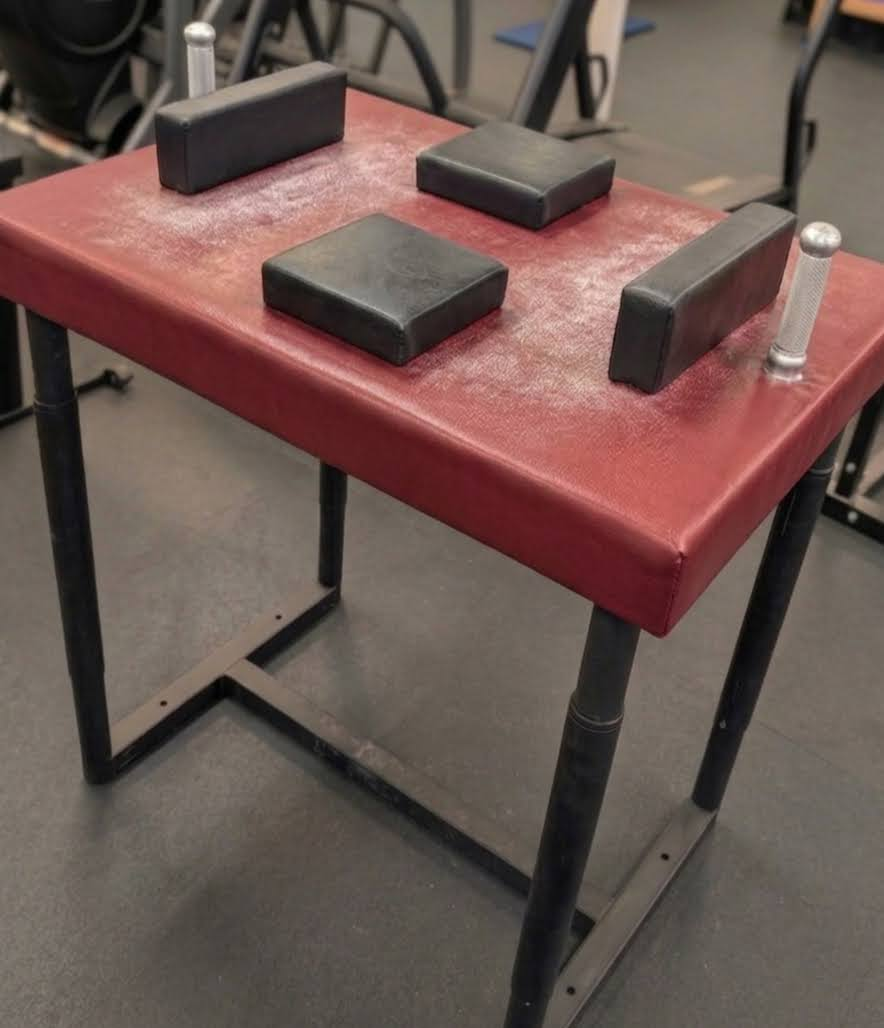
Competitive arm wrestling table.

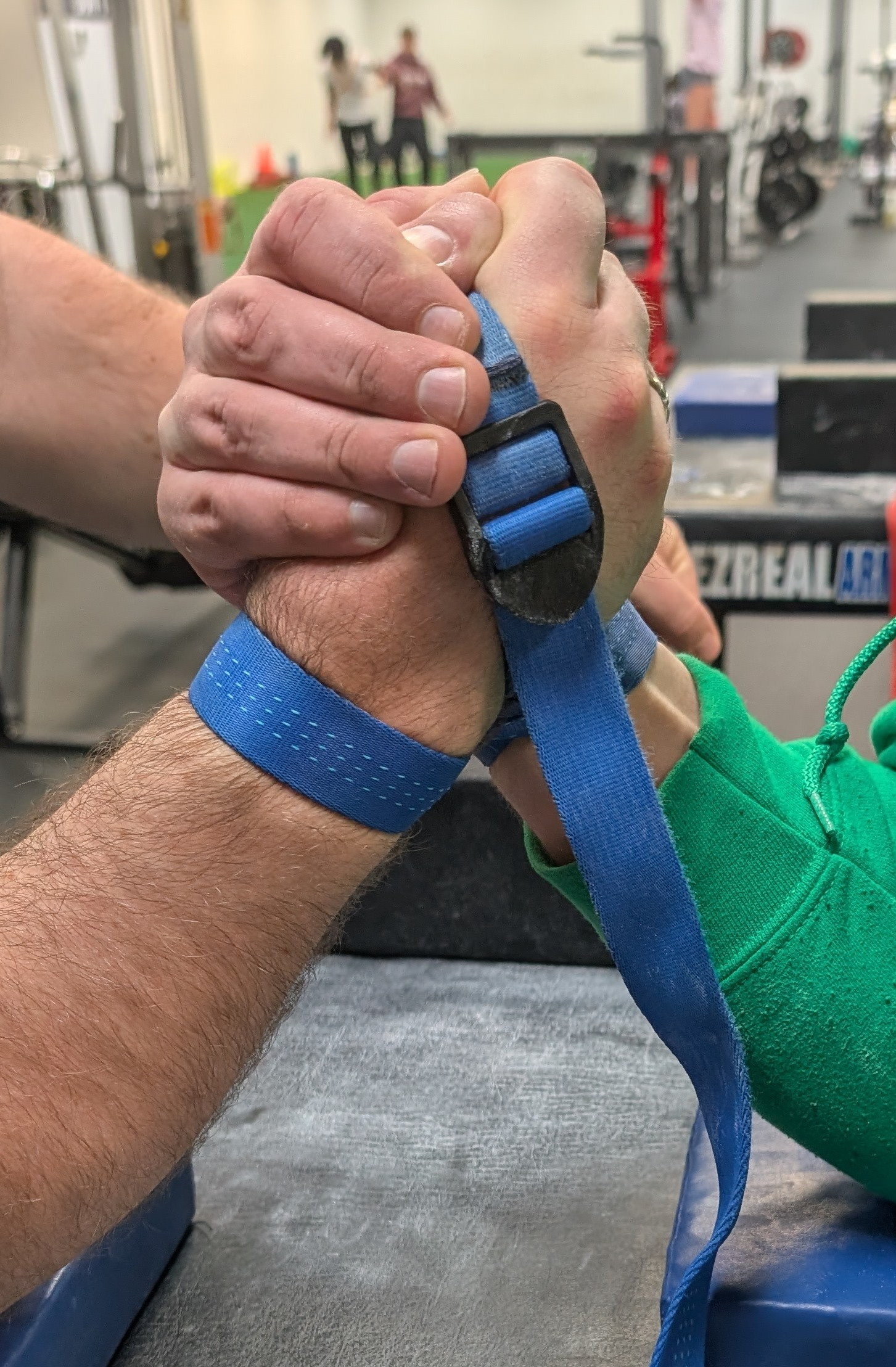
Arm wrestling "in the strap".

=== Table ===
Competitive arm wrestling matches utilize specialized tables which include elbow pads, pin pads, and hand pegs. These tables vary slightly in their dimensions based on the governing body of the competition, but are always symmetrical with predefined distances between the elbow pads and pin pads. The elbow pads indicate the area within which a competitor's elbow must remain throughout the match. The pin pads indicate the height below which an opponent's hand must be in order to be pinned. Hand pegs must be gripped with the non-wrestling arm and are used for additional leverage.

=== Strap ===
A strap typically composed of a 1" wide strip of nylon or cloth, with a plastic or metal buckle on one end, may be used to bind the competitors' hands and wrists in order to prevent a slip during an arm wrestling match.

== Match format ==
=== Setup ===
Organized matches begin with competitors setting their elbows on the pads, gripping hands under strict alignment rules, and maintaining proper positioning. The referee controls the setup and start of the match, enforcing penalties when necessary.

- Competitors approach table, place elbows of their competing arms on elbow pads and grip hands palm-to-palm.
- Non-competing hands hold the hand pegs at all times.
- Thumbs must remain visible, hands must stay centered on table.
- No part of competing hand may touch the competitor's own body.
- Referee ensures proper alignment of hands, wrists, and forearms, and that shoulders are square.
- A referee will impose a "ref's grip" if competitors cannot achieve a legal grip within a set time; any movement during a ref's grip may result in a foul.
- A referee will apply a strap for a "strap match" if required due to a slip in previous round, or by prior mutual agreement of competitors.
- Referee starts match with "Ready... Go!" or an equivalent signal.

=== Engagement ===
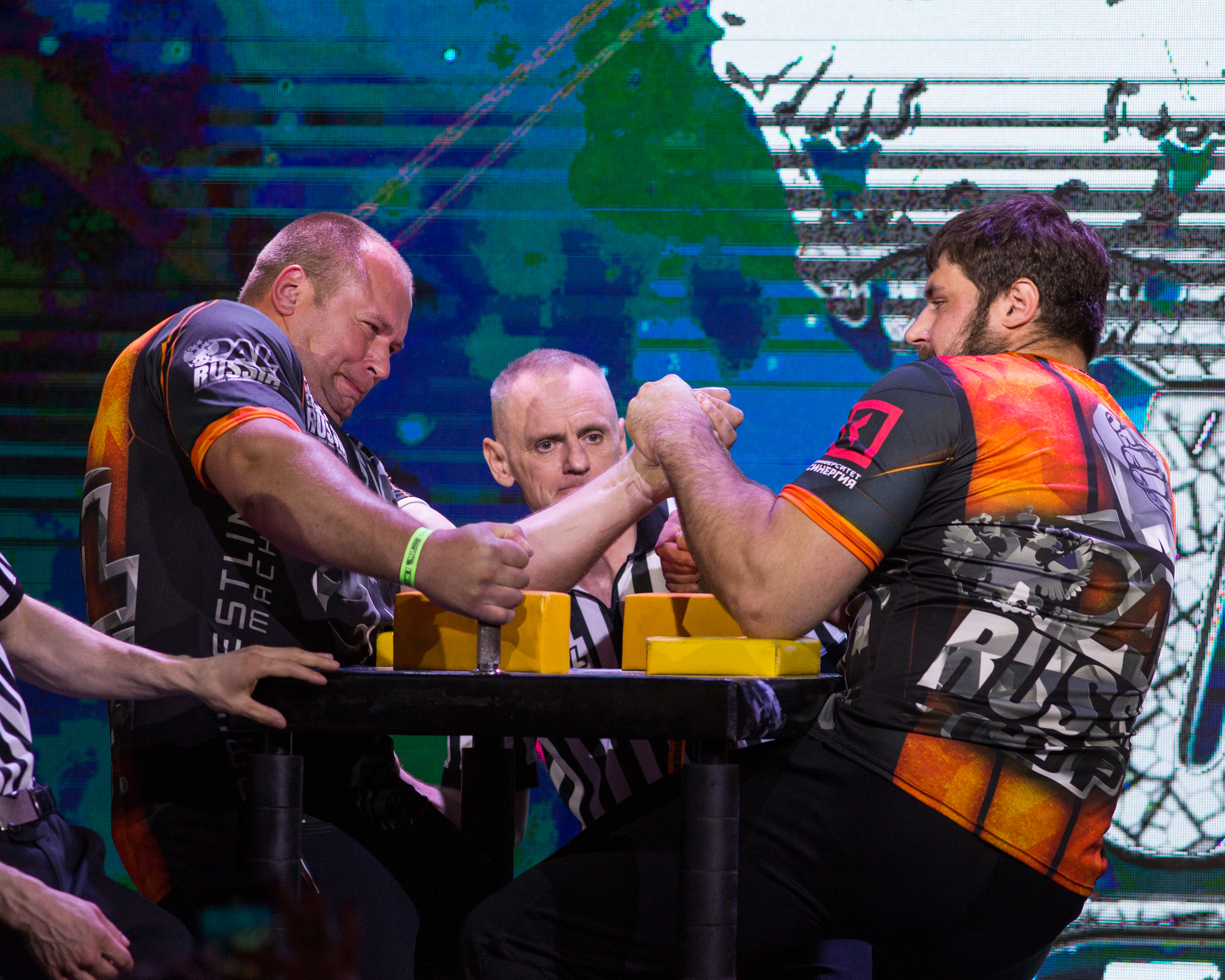
A competitive arm wrestling match.

After the referee's signal, each competitor attempts to pin their opponent's hand to the pad while following strict rules on positioning and conduct.

- After the "Ready... Go!", each competitor tries to "pin" the other by forcing any part of their opponent's hand parallel to or below the line of the pin pad.
- The referee uses a verbal command and/or hand signal to indicate a pin.
- Competitors may use legal techniques while keeping their non-competing hand on the hand peg and at least one foot touching the ground.
- If competitors slip and lose grip, a strap is applied and the match restarts as a strap match.

=== Warnings and fouls ===
Referees may issue warnings or fouls at any point during the match. Two consecutive warnings typically result in a foul. Two consecutive fouls typically result in a loss. Warnings or fouls may be given for:

- early movement, delays, or shifting during the setup
- removing non-competing hand from the peg
- lifting the competing elbow off the pad
- forcing an opponent off their elbow pad
- slipping in a losing position
- lifting both feet off the ground
- touching their own body with the competing hand (i.e. touching shoulder when attempting to press)

Misconduct, intentional fouling, unsportsmanlike behavior, or foul language may result in disqualification.

== Techniques ==
The three main techniques in arm wrestling are known as the "hook", the "toproll", and the "press". There are many movements within these techniques, but all arm wrestling engagement involves one or a combination of these three techniques.

=== Hook ===
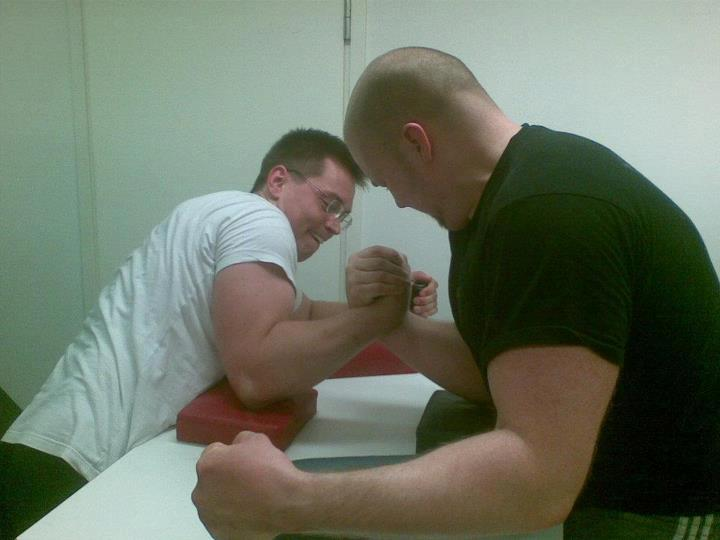
Hook match

The hook (or "hooking") is an "inside" arm wrestling technique where a competitor attempts to cup their hand at the wrist toward their forearm, pulling their opponent toward them in while supinating the hand and forearm. The competitor will combine hand and arm positioning to reduce the opponent's leverage and shift toward the pin pad to gain control. The hook relies primarily on wrist pressure and arm strength, particularly in the biceps, rather than hand control or technique, in contrast to the toproll.

=== Toproll ===
The toproll (or "toprolling") is an "outside" arm wrestling style characterized by pronating the hand and forearm to apply wrist pressure on the opponent, while pulling back and sideways to control the opponent's hand. The competitor's arm should remain at a tight angle, with body movement toward the winning side and the non-competing leg bending to generate momentum. The goal is to open the opponent's wrist, forcing them into a vulnerable position before securing the pin. A successful toproll relies heavily on strength in the rising, pronation, and back pressure movements.

=== Press ===
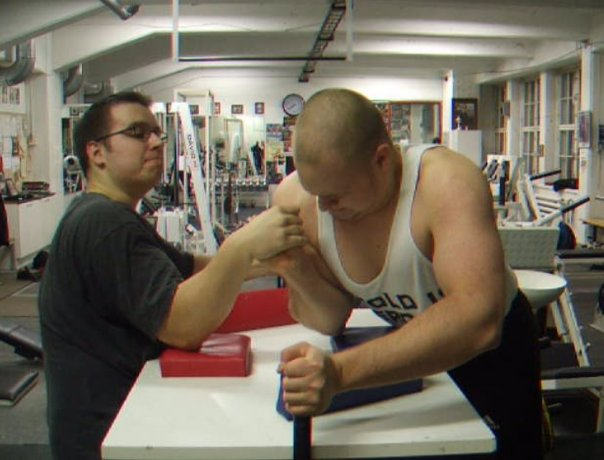
Toproll (left) against press (right)

The press (or "flop wrist press"; "triceps press") is an outside style which involves a competitor getting their body behind their arm to use their shoulder, chest, and triceps to press their opponent's hand and arm to the pin pad. Effective pressing requires proper alignment with the hips and non-competing leg positioned to avoid blocking the pin. This technique is often reserved for neutral or advantageous positions in order to finish an opponent. Beginners should be careful using the press as it can put stress the elbow tendons and cause injury if applied incorrectly. The press can be accessed from either a hook or toproll.

== Movements ==
- "Cupping" refers to flexion of the hand and wrist toward the inner arm. Cupping uses the forearm muscles to bend back an opponent's wrist and decrease their accessible leverage. Strength in this movement is a key factor to success when implementing a hook.
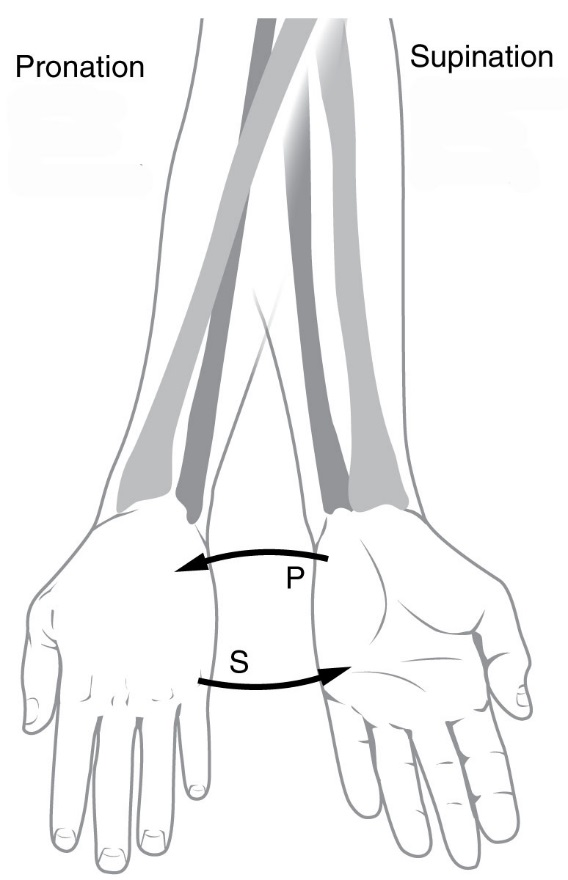
Pronation is downward rotation; supination is upward rotation.
- "Pronation" involves downward rotation of the palm, wrist and forearm. This movement applies hand pressure on an opponent, opening up their fingers, bending back their wrist, and setting them up for a pin. Strength in this movement is important for toprolling.
- "Supination" of the hand involves upward rotation of the palm, wrist and forearm. A competitor will often apply this movement in combination with downward movement of the arm. Strong supination can contribute to success in the hook movement.
- "Rising" involves radial deviation of the hand on the plane of the palm. This movement involves a competitor lifting their wrist to put pressure on the opponent and forcing them into a disadvantageous position. Toprolling in particular utilizes strength in the rising movement.
- "Side pressure" involves isometric contraction of the pectoral muscles, internal shoulder rotators, and whole-body movement to generate force against the opponent's hand, typically sideways across the table toward the pin pad.
- "Back pressure" involves contraction of the back muscles (primarily the lats) and biceps which generate force to pull the opponent across the table toward the competitor. This move increases the opponent's elbow angle and limits the opponent's leverage, while decreasing the angle of the competitor's elbow in relation to their body.
- "Posting" involves upward pressure of the forearm, lifting an opponent's arm upward, in an attempt to bring the competitor's forearm as vertical as possible on the elbow pad. Posting is often utilized in a toproll as an effective counter against a hook. (Note: Meale, Harvey; quote:You want to get your forearm as vertical as possible in the setup with your wrist as close to directly above your elbow as possible. We call this 'posting' because your arm is almost upright, like a post sticking out of the ground.)

== Training ==
There is significant debate surrounding the most effective training methods for arm wrestling due to limited empirical research specific to the sport. While there is not a consensus as to whether arm wrestling practice (commonly known as "table time") or strength training is most effective for developing arm wrestling strength, it is generally accepted that both are important. Strength training typically takes the form of gym exercises specific to arm wrestling movements, and technique is typically gained through table time. Most arm wrestlers rely on trial and error, gathering insights from peers to determine what works best for them.

Common exercises for arm wrestling include lifts such as bicep curls, hammer curls, wrist curls, rows, pull-ups, and other exercises which specialize in developing overall pulling strength. Pushing exercises are generally secondary, except in certain cases where they strengthen techniques and movements such as the press (bench press) and side pressure (JM press).

In addition to standard dumbbells and barbells, arm wrestlers often make use of resistance bands, straps, martial arts belts, and cable systems with specialized handles in order to more closely replicate the angles and tensions of real arm wrestling. Arm wrestlers will often construct their own specialized equipment.

A majority of technique training takes the form of table time. Table time often involves engaging in recreational matches or exercises between two individuals on an arm wrestling table, starting from various starting positions and scenarios, with the intended purpose of developing one's strategy and techniques against a large variety of opponents and styles. Arm wrestling practice strategies and scenarios can include endurance, static reps, strap training, "ready go" training, and speed training.

== Organizations and promotions ==
Notable governing organizations include the International Federation of Armwrestling (IFA) and the World Armwrestling Federation (WAF). Notable promotions include the World Armwrestling League (WAL), and East vs West.

== Risks ==
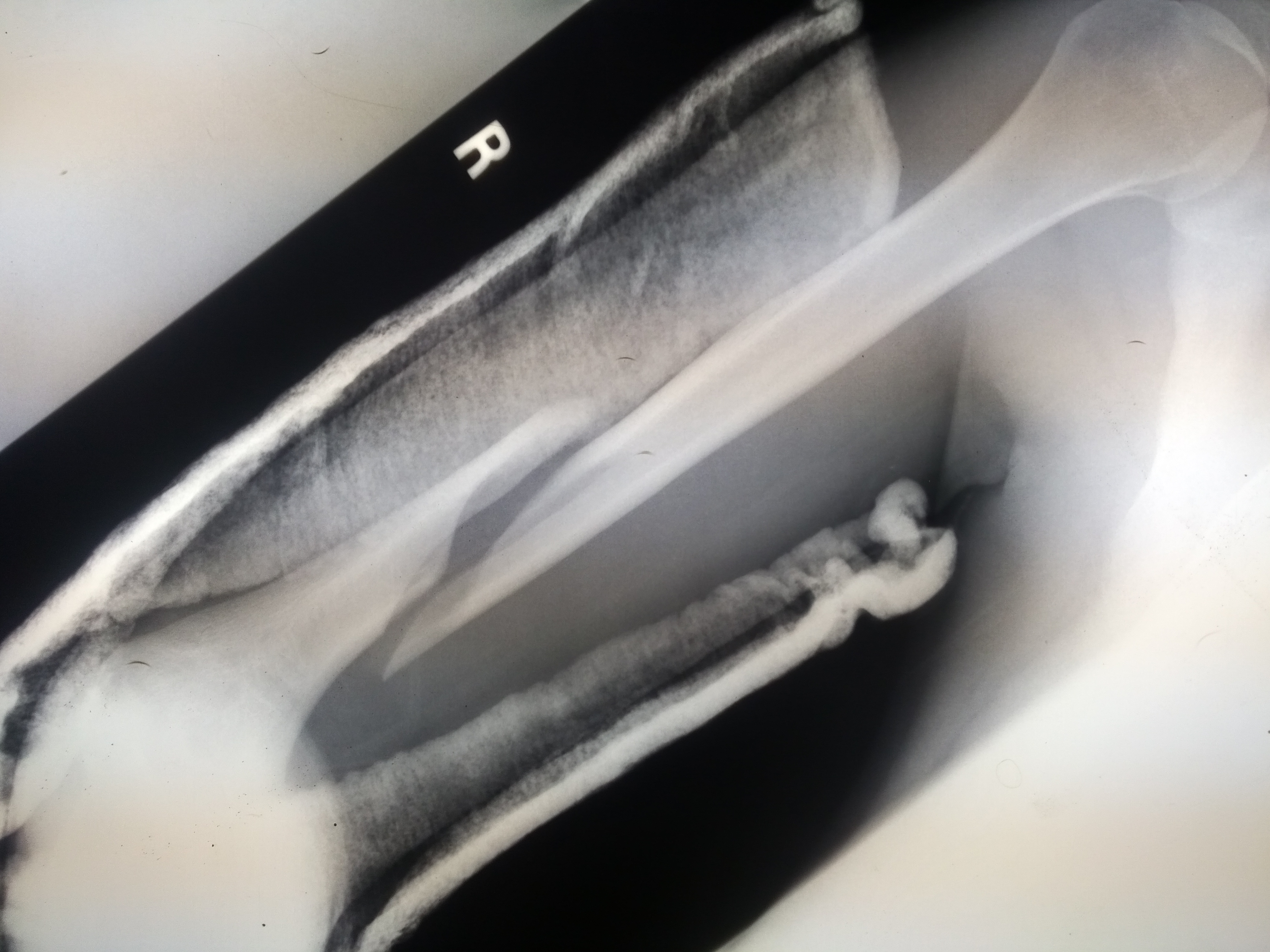
Typical fracture

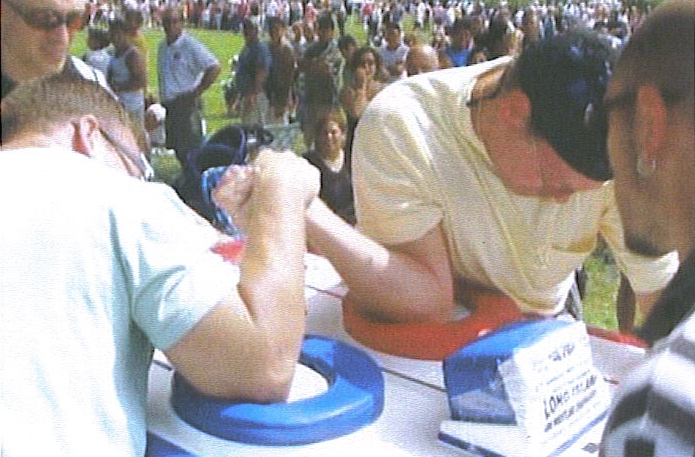
The competitor on the right is in an injury-prone or "break arm" position. To avoid injury, a competitor's shoulder should be in line with or behind their arm, and their arm and body should be facing their competing hand.

Arm wrestling is associated with various injuries, including humerus fractures, shoulder dislocations, soft-tissue damage, nerve injuries, and tendonitis. Injuries associated with arm wrestling occur most commonly between novices or athletes of significant strength difference, when competitors are forced into unsafe positions out of inexperience or inability to maintain advantage. Matches or practices involving experienced competitors with the proper conditioning and knowledge produce injuries at a lower rate than novices. Most individuals experiencing injuries regain full function with proper treatment.

Spiral humerus fractures are the most common fracture experienced and often occur in the dominant arm, especially among amateurs. Fractures may require longer recovery times and, in severe cases, surgical intervention. Fractures are significantly more likely when one of the competitors rotates their shoulder inward (as in a press) without first getting behind their hand, a position known as the "break arm" position.

Beginners should attempt to maintain eye contact with their own hand, keep their shoulders square, and pull (rather than push) their opponent to the pin pad, in order to prevent reaching a position that could cause injury.

== See also ==
- Hand strength
- Grip strength
- Grappling
- Thumb war
