= Merve Yenidünya =

Turkish arm wrestler (born 2004)

Personal information
- Nationality: Turkish
- Born: 2004 (age 21–22) Kilis, Turkey
- Education: Kilis 7 Aralık University
- Years active: 2015–

Sport
- Country: Turkey
- Sport: Armwrestling
- Event(s): +90 kg, +70 kg (Junior)
Medal record
Women's Arm wrestling
Representing Turkey
World Armwrestling Championship
Bronze medal – third place	2023 Almaty	+90 kg Left arm
Gold medal – first place	2023 Almaty	+90 kg Right arm
Silver medal – second place	2023 Almaty	Y +70 kg Left arm
Gold medal – first place	2023 Almaty	Y +70 kg Right arm
Bronze medal – third place	2022 Antalyay	+90 kg Left arm
Silver medal – second place	2022 Antalya	J +70 kg Left arm
Gold medal – first place	2022 Antalya	J +70 kg Right arm
Gold medal – first place	2021 Bucharest	J +70 kg Left arm
Gold medal – first place	2019 Constanța	Y +70 kg Left arm
Gold medal – first place	2019 Constanța	Y +70 kg Right arm
European Armwrestling Championship
Bronze medal – third place	2023 Chișinău	+90 kg Left arm
Bronze medal – third place	2023 Chișinău	+90 kg Right arm
Gold medal – first place	2023 Chișinău	Y +70 kg Left arm
Gold medal – first place	2023 Chișinău	Y +70 kg Right arm
Silver medal – second place	2022 Bucharest	+90 kg Left arm
Silver medal – second place	2022 Bucharest	+90 kg Right arm

Merve Yenidünya (born 2004) is a Turkish armwrestler. Competing in the senior women's +90 kg category, she has been world and European champion several times in both left and right arm categories.

== Sport career ==
Inspired by her older brother, Yenidünya started her armwrestling career at Kilis in 2015. She won 16 Turkish championships as of 2023.

She won the gold medals in both arms events of the Sub-junior (Youth) +70 kg at the 2019 World Armwrestling Championship held in Constanța, Romania.

In 2021, she captured the gold medal in the Junior +70 kg event of the World Armwrestling Championship in Bucharets, Romania.

She won the silver medal in both arms at the 2022 European Armwrestling Championship in Bucharest, Romania. She received the bronze medal in the +90 kg event, and the silver and the gold medal in the Junior +70 kg left and right arm events respectively at the 2022 World Armwrestling Championship in Antalya, Turkey.

At the 2023 European Armwrestling Championship in Chișinău, Moldova, she took the gold medal in the left arm event and another gold medal in the right arm event of the Youth +70 kg category, as well as two bronze medals in the left and right arm events of the Senior +90 kg category. She won the silver medal in the left arm and the gold medal in the right arm event of the Youth +70 kg category, as well as the bronze medal in the left arm and the gold medal in the right arm event of the Senior +90 kg category at the 2023 World Armwrestling Championship in Almaty, Kazakhstan.

== Personal life ==
Merve Yenidünya was born in 2004. She lives in Kilis, southeastern Turkey, and studies in the School of Physical Education and Sports at Kilis 7 Aralık University.
