= Rabia Kayahan =

Turkish arm wrestler (born 2000)

Personal information
- Nationality: Turkish
- Born: 2000 (age 25–26) Torul, Gümüşhane Province, Turkey
- Education: Bayburt University
- Years active: 2017-

Sport
- Country: Turkey
- Sport: Armwrestling
- Event: 65 kg
- Club: Gümüşhane Kayak S.K.
- Coached by: Davut Altıntaş

Rabia Kayahan (born 2000) is a Turkish armwrestler competing in the 65 kg category. She is a world and European medalist.

== Private life ==
Rabia Kayahan was born in Torul district of Gümüşhane Province, Turkey in 2000. She lost her mother in 2019.

She finished the İmam Hatip High School in her hometown. She is a student of Physical Education and Sports at Bayburt University.

== Sports career ==
Kayahan started performing arm wrestling with the encouragement of her teacher of Physical education in the senior year of high school. She was motivated by her father and older sisters for this sport. She is a member of Gümüşhane Kayak S.K. (Ski club).

At her first participation at the Turkish Championship in 2017, she placed first on the left arm and third on the right. Admitted to the national team, she debuted at the 2018 European Championship held in Sofia, Bulgaria. She became European champion on both arms in the Youth 70 kg category. The same year, she took the bronze medal on the right arm at the World Championship in Antalya, Turkey. In 2019, she took the bronze medal on the left arm and the silver medal on the right in the Youth 70 kg category at the European Championship in Loutraki, Greece. In March 2020, Kayahan won two gold medals in the 70 kg category at the Turkish Untrauniversity Tournament in Antalya. From the 2021 World Armwrestling Championship in Bucharest, Romania, she returned home with two bronze medals won on both arms in the 65 kg category. She confirmed her champion title on both arms in the Turkish Championship in March 2022. At the 2022 World Armwrestling Championship in Antalya, she placed 6th on the left arm.

== International individual achievements ==
Year	Date	Location	Competition	Event (kg)	Left rm	Right arm	Ref.
2018	25 May – 3 Jun	(Bulgaria) Sofia	28th European Champ.	Youth 70	1st place, gold medalist(s)	1st place, gold medalist(s)	
2018	12–21 Oct	(Turkey) Antalya	40th World Champ.	Youth 70	4th	3rd place, bronze medalist(s)	
2019	14 - 23 May	(Greece) Loutraki	29th European Champ.	Youth 70	3rd place, bronze medalist(s)	2nd place, silver medalist(s)	
2019	26 Oct – 4 Nov	(Romania) Constanța	41st World Champ.	Youth 70	3rd place, bronze medalist(s)	2nd place, silver medalist(s)	
2021	23 Nov – 3 Dec	(Romania) Bucharest	42nd World Champ.	65	3rd place, bronze medalist(s)	3rd place, bronze medalist(s)	
2022	7–14 May	(Romania) Bucharest	31st European Champ.	65	3rd place, bronze medalist(s)	4th	
2022	14–23 Oct	(Turkey) Antalya	43rd World Champ.	65	6th	9th	
