= Gülendam Sarıbal =

Turkish arm wrestler (born 1972)

Personal information
- Born: 1972 (age 53–54) Turkey

Sport
- Sport: Arm wrestling
- Weight class: 80 kg
- Club: Güngören Yeni Akıncılar Sports Club
- Coached by: Emin Kaska

Gülendam Sarıbal (born 1972) is a Turkish armwrestler. She won medals on both arms in the 80 kg Senior, Master and Grand Master categories at the world and European championships.

== Private life ==
Gülendam Sarıbal was born in 1972. She is the mother of four children. She lives in Güngören district of Istanbul Province.

== Sports career ==
Sarıbal became interested in arm wrestlingwhile watching her husband in competition. In 2011 at age 39, she entered Güngören Yeni Akıncılar Sports Club in Istanbul, and started performing arm wrestling. Following trainings coached by Emin Kaska, she became champion at the Istanbul Provincial Tournament. She then won the Turkish Championship in the Senior 80 kg category. In 2018, she became Turkish champion in the 80 kg, and was admitted to the national team to participate at the European Championship in Bulgaria. She returned from Sofia, Bulgaria with a 5th place on the left arm.

== International individual achievements ==
Year	Date	Location	Competition	Event (kg)	Left rm	Right arm	Ref.
2016	21–29 May	(Romania) Bucharest	26th European Champ.	Master 80	3rd place, bronze medalist(s)	2nd place, silver medalist(s)	
2016	1–10 Oct	(Bulgaria) Blagoevgrad	38th World Champ.	80	-	9th	
2016	1–10 Oct	(Bulgaria) Blagoevgrad	38th World Champ.	Master 80	2nd place, silver medalist(s)	2nd place, silver medalist(s)	
2018	25 May – 3 Jun	(Bulgaria) Sofia	28th European Champ.	80	5th	7th	
2018	12–21 Oct	(Turkey) Antalya	40th World Champ.	80	8th	7th	
2019	26 Oct – 4 Nov	(Romania) , Constanta	41st World Champ.	80	8th	4th	
2021	23 Nov-3 Dec	(Romania) Bucharest	42nd World Champi.	80	4th	5th	
2021	23 Nov-3 Dec	(Romania) Bucharest	42nd World Champi.	Master 80	2nd place, silver medalist(s)	1st place, gold medalist(s)	
2022	7–14 May	(Romania) Bucharest	31st European Champ.	80	4th	3rd place, bronze medalist(s)	
2022	14–23 Oct	(Turkey) Antalya	43rd World Champ.	80	3rd place, bronze medalist(s)	2nd place, silver medalist(s)	
2022	14–23 Oct	(Turkey) Antalya	43rd World Champ.	Grand Master 80	X	1st place, gold medalist(s)	
