= Esra Kiraz =

Turkish arm wrestler (born 1992)

Personal information
- Nationality: Turkish
- Born: 1992 (age 33–34) Turkey
- Education: Kocaeli University
- Years active: 2008–

Sport
- Country: Turkey
- Sport: Armwrestling
- Event: 55 kg
- Club: Individual
Medal record
Women's Arm wrestling
Representing Turkey
World Armwrestling Championship
Bronze medal – third place	2023 Almaty	55 kg Left arm
Silver medal – second place	2023 Almaty	55 kg Right arm
Gold medal – first place	2022 Antalya	55 kg Left arm
Gold medal – first place	2022 Antalya	55 kg Right arm
Gold medal – first place	2021 Bucharest	55 kg Left arm
Gold medal – first place	2021 Bucharest	55 kg Right arm
Silver medal – second place	2019 Constanța	50 kg Left arm
Gold medal – first place	2019 Constanța	50 kg Right arm
Gold medal – first place	2018 Antalya	50 kg Left arm
Gold medal – first place	2017 Budapest	50 kg Left arm
Gold medal – first place	2017 Budapest	50 kg Right arm
Silver medal – second place	2016 Blagoevgrad	50 kg Left arm
Silver medal – second place	2016 Blagoevgrad	50 kg Right arm
Silver medal – second place	2015 Kuala Lumpur	50 kg Right arm
Bronze medal – third place	2014 Vilnius	50 kg Right arm
Silver medal – second place	2013 Gdynia	J21 55 kg Left arm
Silver medal – second place	2013 Gdynia	J21 55 kg Right arm
Gold medal – first place	2009 Rosolina	Girls 50 kg Left arm
Gold medal – first place	2009 Rosolina	Girls1 50 kg Right arm
Silver medal – second place	2008 Kelowna	Girls 50 kg Left arm
Silver medal – second place	2008 Kelowna	Girls1 50 kg Right arm
European Armwrestling Championship
Gold medal – first place	2022 Bucharest	55 kg Left arm
Gold medal – first place	2022 Bucharest	55 kg Right arm
Gold medal – first place	2018 Sofia	50 kg Left arm
Gold medal – first place	2018 Sofia	50 kg Right arm
Gold medal – first place	2016 Bucharest	50 kg Left arm
Gold medal – first place	2016 Bucharest	50 kg Right arm
Silver medal – second place	2015 Sofia	50 kg Left arm
Gold medal – first place	2015 Sofia	50 kg Right arm
Silver medal – second place	2014 Baku	50 kg Right arm
Bronze medal – third place	2013 Druskininkai	50 kg Left arm}
Bronze medal – third place	2012 Gdańsk	50 kg Left arm}
Bronze medal – third place	2012 Gdańsk	50 kg Right arm
Gold medal – first place	2011 Antalya	50 kg Left arm
Silver medal – second place	2011 Antalya	50 kg Right arm
Silver medal – second place	2010 Moscow	J 50 kg Right arm

Esra Kiraz (born 1992) is a Turkish armwrestler. Competing in the senior women's 55 kg category, she has been world and European champion several times in both left and right arm categories.

== Early life ==
Esra Kiraz was born into a family of sportspeople in 1992. She went to İmam Hatip High School in Kadıköy, Istanbul. As of 2012–13 she was a student at Kocaeli University.

She grew up helping her father Ömer Kiraz with floor and wall tiling at his construction site, where she carried 50 kg (110 lb) cement bags.

== Sports career ==
=== Early years ===
At school, Kiraz was not a diligent student. She spent more of her time in the school yard. Her teacher of physical education directed her initially to play basketball. In 2006 at age 14, she was selected by her teachers to be sent to an intra-school arm wrestling tournament as no other candidate was available. She took part, and became champion in both left and right arm attracting the attention of a coach of the Istanbul Youth and Sport Directorate, who saw a future world and European champion in her.

In fact she was interested in martial arts, but pursued a career as an armwrestler. Although in the beginning her mother was against her intention, her father fully supported her. Her father accompanied her at trainings, and contributed financially for her participations at international competitions. On the way to the championship, they always walked shoulder to shoulder.

=== Club career ===
Kiraz became Turkish champion in the first official national competition. She competed for Üsküdar Belediye Spor, before she joined Haliç Su Sporları ("Golden Horn Water Sports Club"). During her student time, she competed at the 2013 Turkish Interuniversity Armwrestling Tournament held in Bilecik, and became champion on both arms in the 60 kg category.

In 2014, she became Turkish champion in Kemer, Antalya, where for the first time a great number of sportspeople participated. She was so entitled to take part at the European Championship in Baku, Azerbaijan. Kiraz defended her champion title at the 2015 Turkish Championship in Kemer, Antalya. In 2018, she again won the Turkish champion title in both arms of the 50 kg category. She was selected to the national team again following the Turkish Championship held in Eskişehir between 21 and 25 March 2022.

She is nicknamed "Çelik Bilek" ("The Steel Wrist").

=== International career ===
Kiraz faced her first obstacle when she was about to participate at the 2008 World Championship in Kelowna, British Columbia, Canada. The Turkish Bodybuilding, Fitness and Armwrestling Federation ("Türkiye Vücut Geliştirme, Fitness ve Bilek Güreşi Federasyonu, TVGFBF") did not cover the travel expenses, and she had no sponsors. Her father stepped in selling his work equipment.

She was part of the national team at the 2012 World Championship held in São Vicente, Brazil. After taking many medals and runners-up titles in the Youth and Junior divisions at the world and European championships, she won her first gold medal in the Senior division at the 2011 European Championship in Antalya, Turkey. At the 2015 European Championship in Sofia, Bulgaria, Kiraz competed in the Senior 50 kg category against 13 opponents including some former world and European champions. On the left arm in the final, she lost to her Russian opponent, and took the silver medal. On the right arm in the final, she defeated the Russian, and became European champion. Kiraz took two silver medals at the 2016 World Championship in Blagoevgrad, Bulgaria. She became champion in both arms of the 50 kg at the 2017 World Armwrestling Championship held in Budapest, Hungary. At the 2018 World Championship held in Antalua, Turkey, she won the gold medal in the 50 kg left arm category.

=== Coaching ===
She shared her experience by coaching. Two women, Burcu Korkmaz and Beyzanur Avcı, were coached by Kiraz.

== International individual achievements ==
Year	Date	Location	Competition	Event (kg)	Left rm	Right arm	Ref.
2008	29 Nov – 7 Dec	(Canada) Kelowna	30th World Champ.	Girls 50	2nd place, silver medalist(s)	2nd place, silver medalist(s)	
2009	7–12 Sep	(Italy) Rosolina	31st World Champ.	Girls 50	1st place, gold medalist(s)	1st place, gold medalist(s)	
2010	31 May – 6 Jun	(Russia) Moscow	20th European Champ.	Junior 50	-	2nd place, silver medalist(s)	
2010	4–12 Dec	(United States) Mesquite	32nd World Champ.	Girls 50	5th	6th	
2011	9–15 May	(Turkey) Antalya	21st European Champ.	50	1st place, gold medalist(s)	2nd place, silver medalist(s)	
2011	28 Nov – 4 Dec	(Kazakhstan) Almaty	33rdWorld Champ.	50	4th	-	
2012	3–20 May	(Poland) Gdańsk	22nd European Champ.	50	3rd place, bronze medalist(s)	3rd place, bronze medalist(s)	
2012	10–18 Sep	(Brazil) São Vicente	34th World Champ.	50	5th	4th	
2013	5–12 May	(Lithuania) Druskininkai	23rd European Champ.	50	3rd place, bronze medalist(s)	-	
2013	4–7 Sep	(Poland) Gdynia	35th World Champ.	Junior21 55	2nd place, silver medalist(s)	2nd place, silver medalist(s)	
2014	18–25 May	(Azerbaijan) Baku	24th European Champ.	50	-	2nd place, silver medalist(s)	
2014	4–21 Sep	(Lithuania) Vilnius	36th World Champ.	50	4th	3rd place, bronze medalist(s)	
2015	1–7 Jun	(Bulgaria) Sofia	25th European Champ.	50	2nd place, silver medalist(s)	1st place, gold medalist(s)	
2015	26 Sep – 4 Oct	(Malaysia) Kuala Lumpur	37th World Champ.	50	5th	2nd place, silver medalist(s)	
2016	21–29 May	(Romania) Bucharest	26th European Champ.	50	1st place, gold medalist(s)	1st place, gold medalist(s)	
2016	1–10 Oct	(Bulgaria) Blagoevgrad	38th World Champ.	50	2nd place, silver medalist(s)	2nd place, silver medalist(s)	
2017	2–11 Sep	(Hungary) Budapest	39th World Champ.	50	1st place, gold medalist(s)	1st place, gold medalist(s)	
2018	25 May – 3 Jun	(Bulgaria) Sofia	28th European Champ.	50	1st place, gold medalist(s)	1st place, gold medalist(s)	
2018	12–21 Oct	(Turkey) Antalya	40th World Champ.	50	1st place, gold medalist(s)	4th	
2019	26 Oct – 4 Nov	(Romania) Constanta	41st World Champ.	50	2nd place, silver medalist(s)	1st place, gold medalist(s)	
2021	23 Nov-3 Dec	(Romania) Bucharest	42nd World Champi.	55	1st place, gold medalist(s)	1st place, gold medalist(s)	
2022	7–14 May	(Romania) Bucharest	31st European Champ.	55	1st place, gold medalist(s)	1st place, gold medalist(s)	
2022	14–23 Oct	(Turkey) Antalya	43rd World Champ.	55	1st place, gold medalist(s)	1st place, gold medalist(s)	

== Honours ==
In 2009, she was named the "Armwrestler of the Year" in Turkey.
