= Esma Nur Çakmak =

Turkish arm wrestler (born 2004)

Personal information
- Full name: Esma Nur Çakmak
- Nationality: Turkish
- Born: Esma Nur Çakmak; 2004 (age 21–22) Ankara, Turkey

Sport
- Country: Turkey
- Sport: Armwrestling
- Event: 60 kg
- Coached by: Hüseyin Tuncel

Esma Nur Çakmak (born 2004) is a Turkish arm wrestler competing in the 60 kg category.

== Private life ==
Esma Nur Çakmak was born to Arif and Satı Çakmak in Ankara, Turkey in 2004. She has three siblings.

== Sports career ==
Aspiring her father, a former sport wrestler, Çakmak initially started with boxing. She then settled on performing arm wrestling in January 2020.

In August 2021, she won the Turkish Championship in the Senior 60 kg category. She is coached by Hüseyin Tuncel.

She won two gold medals in the 60 kg Junior 18 category at the 2021 World Championship held in Bucharest, Romania.

She again became champion on both arms of the 60 kg Junior 18 category, and she captured the gold medal on the right hand of the Senior 60 kg category at the 2022 World Championship in Antalya, Turkey.

== International individual achievements ==
Year	Date	Location	Competition	Event (kg)	Left rm	Right arm	Ref.
2021	23 Nove-3 Dec	(Romania) Bucharest	42nd World Champi.	Junior 18 60	1st place, gold medalist(s)	1st place, gold medalist(s)	
2022	14–23 Oct	(Turkey) Antalya	43rd World Champ.	Junior 18 60	1st place, gold medalist(s)	1st place, gold medalist(s)	
2022	14–23 Oct	(Turkey) Antalya	43rd World Champ.	60 kg	11th	1st place, gold medalist(s)	
