= List of Palestinian rocket attacks on Israel in 2016 =

The following is a detailed list of Palestinian rocket and mortar attacks on Israel in 2016. All of the attacks originated in the Gaza Strip, unless stated otherwise. For information pertaining to the wider conflict, see Arab–Israeli conflict and Israeli–Palestinian conflict. This list does not include reports of deaths and injuries caused by Hamas rocket and mortar attacks that fell within Gaza.

In August 2014, Operation Protective Edge was ended after 4,594 rockets and mortars launched toward Israel. From the end of the operation came into force an unofficial cease-fire between Israel and Hamas.

== January ==
January 1

Around 11pm, five rockets were fired from Gaza at Israel. Two rockets fell inside Israel in open areas at Sha'ar Hanegev regional council. The other three fell in Gaza.

January 24

Around 9pm, 1 rocket was fired from Gaza at Israel. The rocket fell inside Israel in an open area at Sha'ar Hanegev regional council.

== February ==
There were no Palestinian rocket attacks on Israel in February.

== March ==
March 11

Around 10:30pm, 4 rockets fired from Gaza at Israel. All rockets fell in open area at Sha'ar Hanegev regional council.

March 14

Around 11:40pm, 1 rocket fired from Gaza at Israel. The rocket fell in open area at Sha'ar Hanegev regional council.

== April ==
There were no Palestinian rocket attacks on Israel in April.

== May ==
May 7

1 rocket fired from Gaza at Israel. The rocket fell at Eshkol Regional Council without injures or damage. The attack came after 3 days of clashes near the border between Hamas and Israel.

May 25

Around 11pm, 1 rocket fired from Gaza at Israel. The rocket fell at Sha'ar Hanegev Regional Council without injures or damage. A salafist group named Ajnad Bait al-Maqdis claimed responsibility.

== June ==
There were no Palestinian rocket attacks on Israel in June.

== July ==
July 1

Around 11pm, 2 rockets fired from Gaza at Israel. One rocket fell in an empty preschool in Sderot causing extensive damage to the building. No direct casualties were reported. The second rocket fell in open area.

== August ==
August 21

Around 14:25, 1 rocket fired from Gaza at Israel. The rocket fell in Sderot between 2 homes; no injuries were reported.

== See also ==
- ISIL rocket attacks on Turkey (2016)
