= Niyazi Kurt =

Turkish arm wrestler (born 1971)

Personal information
- Nationality: Turkish
- Born: 1971 (age 54–55) Artova, Tokat Province, Turkey
- Education: Marmara University
- Years active: 1989-2011

Sport
- Country: Turkey
- Sport: Armwrestling

Niyazi Kurt (born 1971) is a Turkish school teacher, former world and European champion armwrestler and sport coach. Currently, he is the president of the Turkish Bodybuilding, Fitness and Armwrestling Federation.

== Private life ==
Niyazi Kurt was born in Artova district of Tokat Province in 1971. Around 1976, he settled in Pendik district of Istanbul Province.

He finished İmam Hatip High School in Pendik in 1989, and studied Physical Education and Sports at Marmara University graduating in 1997. He was appointed as a school teacher the same year. After serving in the military between December 1998 and August 1999, he worked as a teacher of physical education at Mehmet Akif Ersoy Middle SChool in Pendik. He was honored as the "Most successful teacher of the Year". Between 1992 and 1998, he ran a gym for bodybuilding and arm wrestling in Pendik.

Kurt is father of one child.[1]

== Sports career ==
=== Armwrestler ===
Kurt started performing arm wrestling in 1989. He won the Turkish Championship 26 times. He became European champion in 1998, 1999, 2010 and 2011. he took the bronze medal in 2000, 2002 and 2007. At the World Championships, he captured the gold medal in 1998 and 2000, the silver medal in 1997, and the bronze medal in 2001 and 2006.

=== Sport coach ===
He holds coaching certificates in badminton, volleyball and swimming (3rd level) and arm wrestling (4th level). He served as swimming coach in summer sports schools for many years. He trained many athletes in arm wrestling branch, who became national team members successfully representing Turkey at international competitions. He also served as the coach of national arm wrestling team.

=== Administrator ===
Kurt served as the Arm Wrestling Technical Committee and Board member in the Turkish Bodybuilding, Fitness and Armwrestling Federation. He was elected president of the federation, serving in 2011, 2012, 2016, 2021, and 2022.
