= Gökhan Budak =

- Born: 1968; Olur, Erzurum, Turkey
- Died: 26 January 2013 (aged 44–45); Erzurum, Turkey
- Education: Ankara University
- Spouse: Sibel Budak
- Scientific career
- Fields: Quantum physics
- Workplaces: Atatürk University; Ağrı İbrahim Çeçen University; Bayburt University

Gökhan Budak (1968 – 26 January 2013) was a Turkish professor of quantum physics. He was the Rector of Bayburt University from 7 September 2012 to his death.

== Biography ==
Gökhan Budak was born in Olur, Erzurum. He graduated first in his year with a B.S. degree from Ankara University Faculty of Language, History and Geography in 1989. He started his academic career as a research assistant in 1990. He became an assistant professor (yardımcı doçent) in 1996, an associate professor (doçent) in 2000 and a full professor in 2006.

He committed suicide by cutting his wrists and jumping from balcony of his house on 26 January 2013. His funeral was held at both Bayburt University and Olur Merkez Mosque, and buried in Olur Cemetery on 27 January 2013.
