= Şükriye Yılmaz =

Turkish arm wrestler (born 2001)

Personal information
- Nationality: Turkish
- Born: 2001 (age 24–25) Gümüşhane, Turkey
- Education: Gümüşhane University
- Years active: 2015–

Sport
- Country: Turkey
- Sport: Armwrestling
- Event: 55 kg
- Club: Gümüşhane Belediyesi S.K.
- Coached by: Davut Altıntaş

Şükriye Yılmaz (born 2001) is a Turkish armwrestler competing in the 60 kg category. She won medals mostly in the 55 kg category of Youth and Junior events.

== Early life and education ==
Şükriye Yılmaz was born in a village of Gümüşhane Province, Turkey in 2001. She is the youngest of her two siblings.

She finished the İmam Hatip Anatolian Girls' High School in her hometown. She is a student of Physical Education and Sports at Gümüşhane University.

== Sports career ==
Yılmaz met armwrestling when she changed her school, where she played handball. After two months of training, she decided to pursue this sport at age 14 in 2015. Although the armwrestling is widely known as a men's sport, she continued to perform. She went to her first tournament without the knowledge of her parents. Yılmaz proved herself to her family with her achievements. She became successful at national and international level.

At the 2018 World Championship in Antalya, Turkey, she became champion on the left arm and took the silver medal on the right arm in the 55 kg Juniur category. At the 2019 World Championship in Constanța, Romania, she became champion on the left arm of the Junior 55 kg category.

She is a member of Gümüşhane Belediyesi Sports Club. She is coached by Davut Altuntaş. The successes of Yılmaz, who had to train with male athletes due to the lack of female armwrestlers in this branch in the years she started, also changed the view of women living in the city towards arm wrestling.

== International individual achievements ==
Year	Date	Location	Competition	Event (kg)	Left rm	Right arm	Ref.
2018	25 May – 3 Jun	(Bulgaria) Sofia	28th European Champ.	Junior 55	2nd place, silver medalist(s)	2nd place, silver medalist(s)	
2018	25 May – 3 Jun	(Bulgaria) Sofia	28th European Champ.	55	-	3rd place, bronze medalist(s)	
2018	12–21 Oct	(Turkey) Antalya	40th World Champ.	Junior 55	1st place, gold medalist(s)	2nd place, silver medalist(s)	
2018	12–21 Oct	(Turkey) Antalya	40th World Champ.	55	-	7th	
2019	26 Oct – 4 Nov	(Romania) Constanța	41st World Champ.	Junior 55	1st place, gold medalist(s)	2nd place, silver medalist(s)	
2019	26 Oct – 4 Nov	(Romania) Constanța	41st World Champ.	55	8th	9th	
2021	23 Nov – 3 Dec	(Romania) Bucharest	42nd World Champi.	Youth 55	1st place, gold medalist(s)	1st place, gold medalist(s)	
2021	23 Nov – 3 Dec	(Romania) Bucharest	42nd World Champi.	55	4th	3rd place, bronze medalist(s)	
2022	14–23 Oct	(Turkey) Antalya	43rd World Champ.	Youth 55	2nd place, silver medalist(s)	1st place, gold medalist(s)	
2022	14–23 Oct	(Turkey) Antalya	43rd World Champ.	55	10th	5th	
