= List of Palestinian rocket attacks on Israel in 2017 =

This is a detailed list of Palestinian rocket and mortar attacks on Israel in 2017. The Israeli military reported that 35 rockets and mortars were launched from the Gaza Strip in 2017, the vast majority of them in December. All of the attacks originated in the Gaza Strip, unless stated otherwise. For information pertaining to the wider conflict, see Arab–Israeli conflict and Israeli–Palestinian conflict. This list does not include reports of deaths and injuries caused by Palestinian rocket and mortar attacks that fell within Gaza.

In August 2014, Operation Protective Edge was ended after 4,594 rockets and mortars launched toward Israel. From the end of the operation came into force an unofficial cease-fire between Israel and Hamas.

== February ==
February 6

Around 9am, one rocket was fired from Gaza at Israel. It fell inside Israel in an open area in Hof Ashkelon Regional Council.

February 8

Around 11pm, a barrage of rockets was fired from Sinai at Israel. The Iron Dome defense system intercepted at least 3 rockets over Eilat.

February 20

Around 10am, 2 rockets were fired from Sinai at Israel. fell inside Israel in an open area in Eshkol Regional Council.

February 27

Around 13pm, one rocket was fired from Gaza at Israel. It fell inside Israel in an open area in the Negev.

== March ==
March 15

Around 10pm, one rocket was fired from Gaza at Israel. It fell inside Israel in an open area in the Negev.

March 18

Around 10am, two rockets were fired from Gaza at Israel. One landed short in Gaza, and one fell inside Israel in an open area in the Hof Ashkelon Regional Council.

== April ==
April 10

Around 3pm, one rocket was fired from Sinai at Israel. It fell inside Israel in an open area in the Eshkol Regional Council.

== May ==
May 23

Around 8am, one rocket was fired from Sinai at Israel. It fell inside Israel in an open area in the Negev.

== June ==
June 26

Around 11pm, one rocket was fired from Gaza at Israel. It fell inside Israel in an open area in the Sha'ar Hanegev Regional Council. .

== July ==
July 23

Around 1am, one rocket was fired from Gaza at Israel. It fell inside Israel in an open area in the Sha'ar Hanegev Regional Council.

July 24

Around 1am, one rocket was fired from Gaza at Israel. It fell inside Israel in an open area in the Eshkol Regional Council.

== August ==
August 8

In the August terrorism report by Shabak, it was said that in August there had been one rocket attack from Gaza.

Around 9pm, one rocket was fired from Gaza at Israel. It fell inside Israel in an open area near the city of Ashkelon.

== October ==
In the August terrorism report by Shin Bet, it was said that in October there had been one rocket attack from Sinai.

== November ==
November 30

Around 6:30pm, a barrage of 12 mortars were fired from Gaza at Israeli forces near the Gaza border. The IDF retaliated by striking Hamas positions. Later IDF assessments indicated that the mortars were fired by Palestinian Islamic Jihad.

== December ==
December 7

Around 6pm, on the evening Hamas leader Ismail Haniyeh made calls for a third Intifada the day after the United States declared Jerusalem the capital of Israel, media reports a total of 7 rockets were fired from Gaza at Israel. The first fell inside Israel in an open area near the city of Ashkelon. The IDF retaliated by striking Hamas positions.

December 8

Around 7pm, 4 rockets were fired from Gaza towards Israel, 1 rocket landed short in Gaza, 1 was intercepted by the Iron Dome defense system and 2 rockets landed in the city of Sderot causing damage to a kindergarten and several vehicles. The IDF retaliated by striking Hamas positions killing 2 Hamas members and injuring 25 more Palestinians.

December 11

Around 7pm, 4 rockets were fired from Gaza towards Israel, 2 rockets landed short in Gaza, 2 rockets landed in open areas near the border fence. The IDF retaliated by striking Hamas positions.

Around 11:30pm, 1 rocket was fired from Gaza towards Israel and was intercepted by the Iron Dome. The IDF retaliated by striking Hamas positions.

December 12

Around 7pm, 1 rocket was fired from Gaza towards Israel, it landed short in Gaza.

Around 11pm, 1 rocket was fired from Gaza towards Israel, it landed in an open area in the Hof Ashkelon Regional Council, No damage or injuries were caused. The IDF retaliated by striking Hamas positions.

December 13

Around 8:30pm, 4 rockets were fired from Gaza towards Israel, 2 rockets were intercepted by the Iron Dome, 1 rocket landed in an open area in the Eshkol Regional Council and 1 rocket landed short in Gaza. The IDF retaliated by striking Hamas positions.

December 15

A rocket had been fired from Gaza, but it hit within Gaza hitting a residential building

December 17

Around 9pm, 2 rockets fired from Gaza towards Israel landed in Hof Ashkelon Regional Council causing damage to a home. The IDF retaliated by striking 6 Hamas positions.

December 21

On the 21st, Coordinator of Government Activities in the Territories reported that a mortar, fired toward Israel from Gaza, hit a civilian home in the Gaza Strip.

December 29

Around 12pm, 3 rockets were fired from Gaza towards Israel, 2 were intercepted by the Iron Dome, 1 rocket fell in the area of Nachal Oz causing damage to a public building. The IDF assessed that the mortars were fired by Palestinian Islamic Jihad.

== See also ==
- ISIL rocket attacks on Turkey (2016)
