= Şükriye =

Şükriye , meaning "grateful";, is a feminine given name. Notable people with the name include:

- Şükriye Dikmen ((1918–2000), Turkish painter
- Şükriye Sultan (1906–1972), Ottoman princess
- Şükriye Yılmaz (born 2001), Turkish armwrestler
