= Öncüpınar, Kilis =

Village in Kilis Province, Turkey

Öncüpınar
- Neighbourhood
- Location in Turkey
- Coordinates: 36°38′38″N 37°5′14″E
- Country: Turkey
- Province: Kilis
- District: Kilis
- Municipality: Kilis
- Population (2022): 1,333
- Time zone: UTC+3 (TRT)

Öncüpınar, historically Tibil, is a neighbourhood and village of the city Kilis, Kilis District, Kilis Province, Turkey. It lies south of the city of Kilis, and north of the Syrian town of Azaz. The village had a population of 1,333 in 2022.

In late 19th century, German orientalist Martin Hartmann listed the village as a settlement of 15 houses inhabited by nomadic Turkmen.

A border gate with the same name (Öncüpınar Border Gate, or Öncüpınar Hudut Kapısı in Turkish) opens to Syria here, and the Kilis Öncüpınar Accommodation Facility, a camp for refugees fleeing the Syrian Civil War, is at this village.

== History ==
Tibil has been at least tentatively identified by a number of modern scholars as the site of the Syro–Hittite city of Muru in Bit Agusi.

During the 11th century, it was a fortified place known as Tubbal. It served as the camp of the Byzantine emperor Romanos III during the Battle of Azaz against the Mirdasids of Aleppo in 1030. The Byzantines were routed, but the following year raided the region and burned down Tubbal.

== Bibliography ==
- Dušek, Jan (2019). Dušek, Jan; Mynářová, Jana (eds.). Aramaean Borders: Defining Aramaean Territories in the 10th – 8th Centuries B.C.E. Leiden: Brill. ISBN 978-90-04-39852-8.
- Halm, Heinz (2003). Die Kalifen von Kairo: Die Fatimiden in Ägypten, 973–1074 [The Caliphs of Cairo: The Fatimids in Egypt, 973–1074] (in German). Munich: C. H. Beck. ISBN 3-406-48654-1.
- Younger Jr., K. Lawson (2016). A Political History of the Arameans: From Their Origins to the End of Their Polities. Atlanta: SBL Press. ISBN 978-1-62837-080-5.
