= 2023 World Armwrestling Championship =

Armwrestling contest - see World Armwrestling Championship in wikipedia

2023 World Armwrestling Championship.
- Venue: Sadu Arena, Almaty
- Location: Almaty, Kazakhstan
- Dates: 24 August – 3 September

The 2023 World Armwrestling Championship was the 44th edition of the World Armwrestling Championship held in Almaty, Kazakhstan from 24 August to 3 September .

== Medal summary ==
=== Medal table ===
* Host nation (Kazakhstan)

Rank	Nation	Gold	Silver	Bronze	Total
1	Kazakhstan*	14	19	7	40
2	Georgia	5	5	8	18
3	Bulgaria	3	1	1	5
4	Sweden	2	2	4	8
5	Moldova	2	2	0	4
6	Ukraine	2	0	1	3
6	Uzbekistan	2	0	1	3
8	Japan	2	0	0	2
8	Lithuania	2	0	0	2
10	Turkey	1	2	4	7
11	Romania	1	1	2	4
12	Latvia	1	1	0	2
13	Croatia	1	0	1	2
14	Slovakia	0	2	2	4
15	Switzerland	0	1	1	2
16	Azerbaijan	0	1	0	1
16	United States	0	1	0	1
18	Egypt	0	0	2	2
19	Belarus	0	0	1	1
19	Hungary	0	0	1	1
19	Italy	0	0	1	1
19	Norway	0	0	1	1
23	Armenia	0	0	0	0
Totals (23 entries)		38	38	38	114

=== Medalists ===
==== Men ====
===== Left arm =====
Event	Gold	Silver	Bronze
55 kg	Yerdaulet Nurmakhan; Kazakhstan	Oraz Bassarov; Kazakhstan	Enes Talha Ay; Turkey
60 kg	Meirambek Yersaiyn; Kazakhstan	Kozhantay, Bekzhan; Kazakhstan	Kassem, Ali; Egypt
65 kg	Yerdaulet Sarybay; Kazakhstan	Turarbek Turganbek; Kazakhstan	Natsvlishvili, Tengizi; Georgia
70 kg	Mindaugas Tarasaitis; Lithuania	Rustamov, Ramazan; Azerbaijan	Ustinov, Danil; Kazakhstan
75 kg	Daniel Procopciuc; Moldova	Blumanis, Kristaps; Latvia	Rakhmet, Azamat; Kazakhstan
80 kg	Oleg Zhokh; Ukraine	Nifontov, Mikhail; Kazakhstan	Aidarkhan, Nurdaulet; Kazakhstan
85 kg	Avtandil Tutberidze; Georgia	Aktayev, Talgat; Kazakhstan	Dobrin, Viorel; Romania
90 kg	Sasho Andreev; Bulgaria	Gamtenadze, Irakli; Georgia	Hristov, Nedalin; Bulgaria
100 kg	Elchin Binatov; Georgia	Kostadinov, Krasimir; Bulgaria	Saginashvili, Bacho; Georgia
110 kg	Rino Masic; Croatia	Aitbek, Beket; Kazakhstan	Skaaren, Joachim; Norway
+110 kg	Alizhan Muratov; Kazakhstan	Gapchenko, Boris; Kazakhstan	Murat Efe Kömek; Turkey

===== Right arm =====
Event	Gold	Silver	Bronze
55 kg	Oraz Bassarov; Kazakhstan	Yerdaulet Nurmakhan; Kazakhstan	Zokhir Fayzullaev; Uzbekistan
60 kg	Meirambek Yersaiyn; Kazakhstan	Zhishkariani, Datuna; Georgia	Kassem, Ali; Egypt
65 kg	Natsvlishvili, Tengizi; Georgia	Samat Mukassan; Kazakhstan	Mykola Burko; Ukraine
70 kg	Mindaugas Tarasaitis; Lithuania	Yusuf Ziya Yıldızoğlu; Turkey	Nurdaulet Kadyr; Kazakhstan
75 kg	Daniel Procopciuc; Moldova	Tsikhelashvili, Nodari; Georgia	Sakashvili, Levani; Georgia
80 kg	Nurdaulet Aidarkhan; Kazakhstan	Abdulmanaf Tuzuyev; Kazakhstan	Dgebuadze, Duglas; Georgia
85 kg	Viorel Dobrin; Romania	Egian, David; United States	Melikishvili, Giorgi; Georgia
90 kg	Sasho Andreev; Bulgaria	Botchoidze, Tamaz; Georgia	Gamtenadze, Irakli; Georgia
100 kg	Yesbolat Karzhau; Kazakhstan	Chipreanov, Andrei; Romania	Vladimir Matchenko; Kazakhstan
110 kg	Sandris Sedis; Latvia	Daniyar Roman; Kazakhstan	Masic, Rino; Croatia
+110 kg	Boris Gapchenko; Kazakhstan	Medet Kuttymuratov; Kazakhstan	Manuel Battaglia; Italy

==== Women ====
===== Left arm =====
Event	Gold	Silver	Bronze
50 kg	Nazira Ziyadulla; Kazakhstan	Babaieva, Snizhana; Switzerland	Nodia, Mariam; Georgia
55 kg	Ayane Takenaka; Japan	Zhanna Kaztuganova; Kazakhstan	Esra Kiraz; Turkey
60 kg	Carolina Pettersson; Sweden	Debnarova, Lucia; Slovakia	Karlsson, Viktoria; Sweden
65 kg	Oxana Pismennaya; Kazakhstan	Rebeka Martinkovicova; Slovakia	Reisek, Fia; Sweden
70 kg	Nazokat Solieva; Uzbekistan	Gunko, Yevgeniya; Kazakhstan	Ivanfi, Brigitta; Hungary
80 kg	Deshi Dursayeva; Kazakhstan	Iordachi, Marina; Moldova	Gronlund, Anna; Sweden
90 kg	Irina Driaeva; Georgia	Felicia Eklund; Sweden	Kaliuk, Tatsiana; Belarus
+90 kg	Antonina Lissyanskaya; Kazakhstan	Sydykzhan, Malena; Kazakhstan	Merve Yenidünya; Turkey

===== Right arm =====
Event	Gold	Silver	Bronze
50 kg	Sandugash Seidish; Kazakhstan	Karimbayeva, Laura; Kazakhstan	Babaieva, Snizhana; Switzerland
55 kg	Ayane Takenaka; Japan	Esra Kiraz; Turkey	Zhanna Kaztuganova; Kazakhstan
60 kg	Dimitrina Petrova; Bulgaria	Pettersson, Carolina; Sweden	Debnarova, Lucia; Slovakia
65 kg	Fia Reisek; Sweden	Plieva, Bela; Georgia	Martinkovic, Rebeka; Slovakia
70 kg	Nazokat Solieva; Uzbekistan	Gozhamberdiyeva, Takhmina; Kazakhstan	Malik, Arailym; Kazakhstan
80 kg	Liliya Zanko; Ukraine	Iordachi, Marina; Moldova	Gronlund, Anna; Sweden
90 kg	Irina Driaeva; Georgia	Raushan Janaliyeva; Kazakhstan	Kaliuk, Tatsiana; Belarus
+90 kg	Merve Yenidünya; Turkey	Bakayeva, Alua; Kazakhstan	Bercea, Alexia; Romania
