= Oylum, Kilis =

Village in Kilis Province, Turkey

Oylum
- Neighbourhood
- Location within Turkey
- Coordinates: 36°41′52″N 37°10′50″E
- Country: Turkey
- Province: Kilis
- District: Kilis
- Municipality: Kilis
- Population (2022): 517
- Time zone: UTC+3 (TRT)

Oylum is a neighbourhood of the city Kilis, Kilis District, Kilis Province, Turkey. The village had a population of 517 in 2022.

In late 19th century, German orientalist Martin Hartmann listed the village as a settlement of 15 houses inhabited by Turks.

== Archaeology ==
Oylum is home to a höyük mound with evidence of settlement dating as far back as the Chalcolithic. Settlement continued into the Bronze and Iron Ages. Some or all of the settlement was destroyed by fire twice in the Middle Bronze Age. A third destruction event in the Late Bronze Age may be associated with Šuppiluliuma I's military campaign in Syria.

The name of the site during this period of settlement has not been definitively determined. "Oylum might be the Ulisum/Ullis referred to in the third millennium BC and the Ullaza/Ukulzat/Kuilzila of the second millennium BC." Alternatively, Oylum has been suggested as the location of Hassuwa.

Excavations have revealed a palace or administrative building dating to the Middle Bronze Age I period that was destroyed by fire. A well-preserved pottery kiln was discovered that was built during the Middle Bronze Age II period on top of the palace ruins.

Bronze Age artifacts discovered at Oylum Höyük that contain inscriptions include a fragmentary cuneiform tablet from the Hittite period, which has been identified as a treaty between the Hittite King and a local ruler; a lapis lazuli cylinder seal with a cuneiform inscription indicating that it belonged to a vizier named Bitna; and a tablet written in Old Babylonian concerning a commercial debt. Non-epigraphic finds suggest that Bronze Age Oylum shared a similar material culture to nearby Alalakh.
