= Kilis =

- Municipality
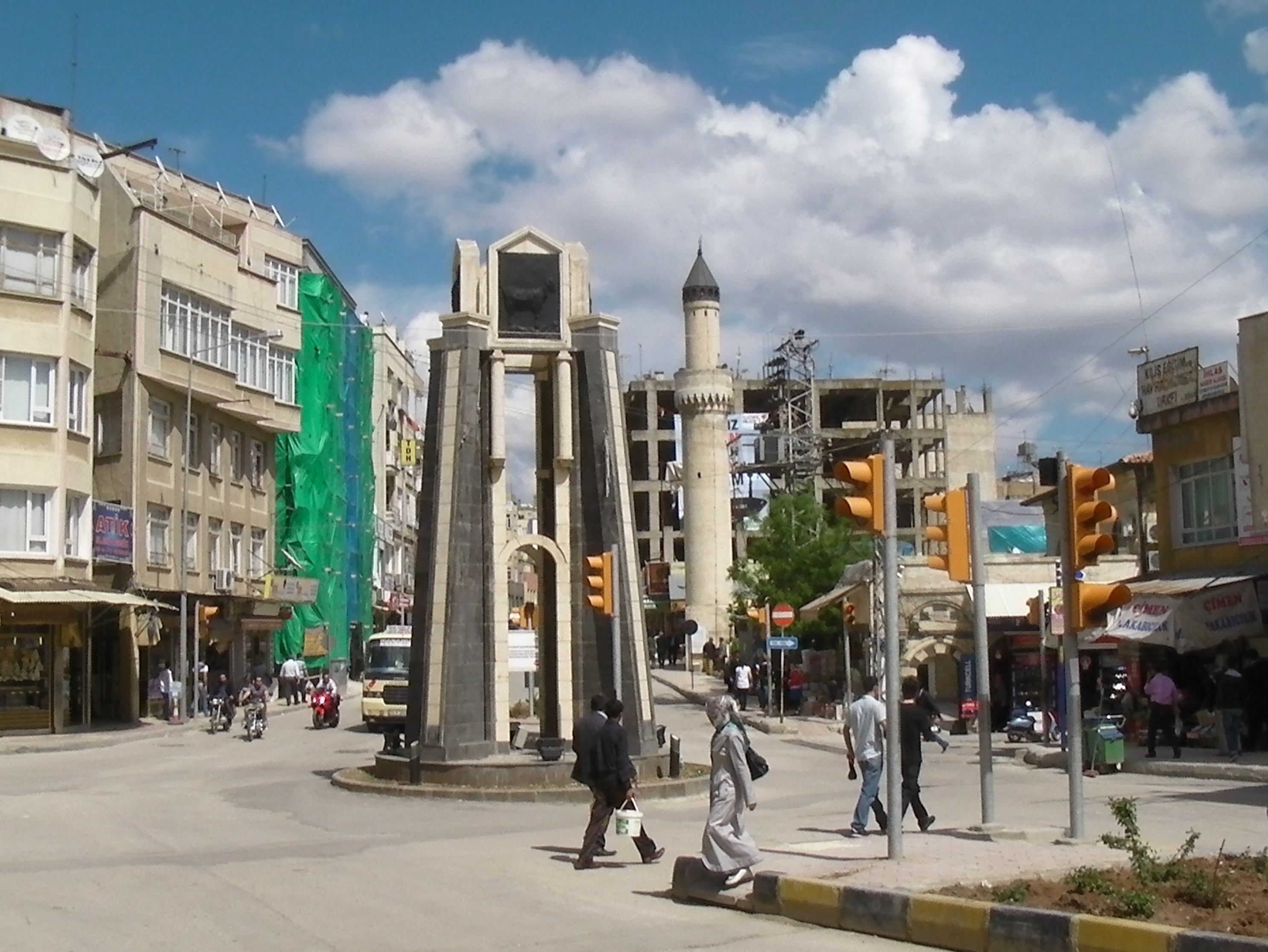
- Kilis city center

- Coat of arms

- Location within Turkey
- Coordinates: 36°43′N 37°07′E
- Country: Turkey
- Province: Kilis
- District: Kilis

Government
  - Mayor: Hakan Bilecen (Ind.)
- Elevation: 660 m (2,170 ft)
- Population (2022): 112,187
- Time zone: UTC+3 (TRT)
- Postal code: 79000
- Area code: 0348
- Website: www.kilis.bel.tr

Kilis is a city in southernmost Turkey, near the border with Syria, and the administrative centre of Kilis Province and Kilis District. Its population is 112,187 (2022).

On 6 February 2023 Kilis was badly affected by the twin Turkey-Syria earthquakes.

== History ==
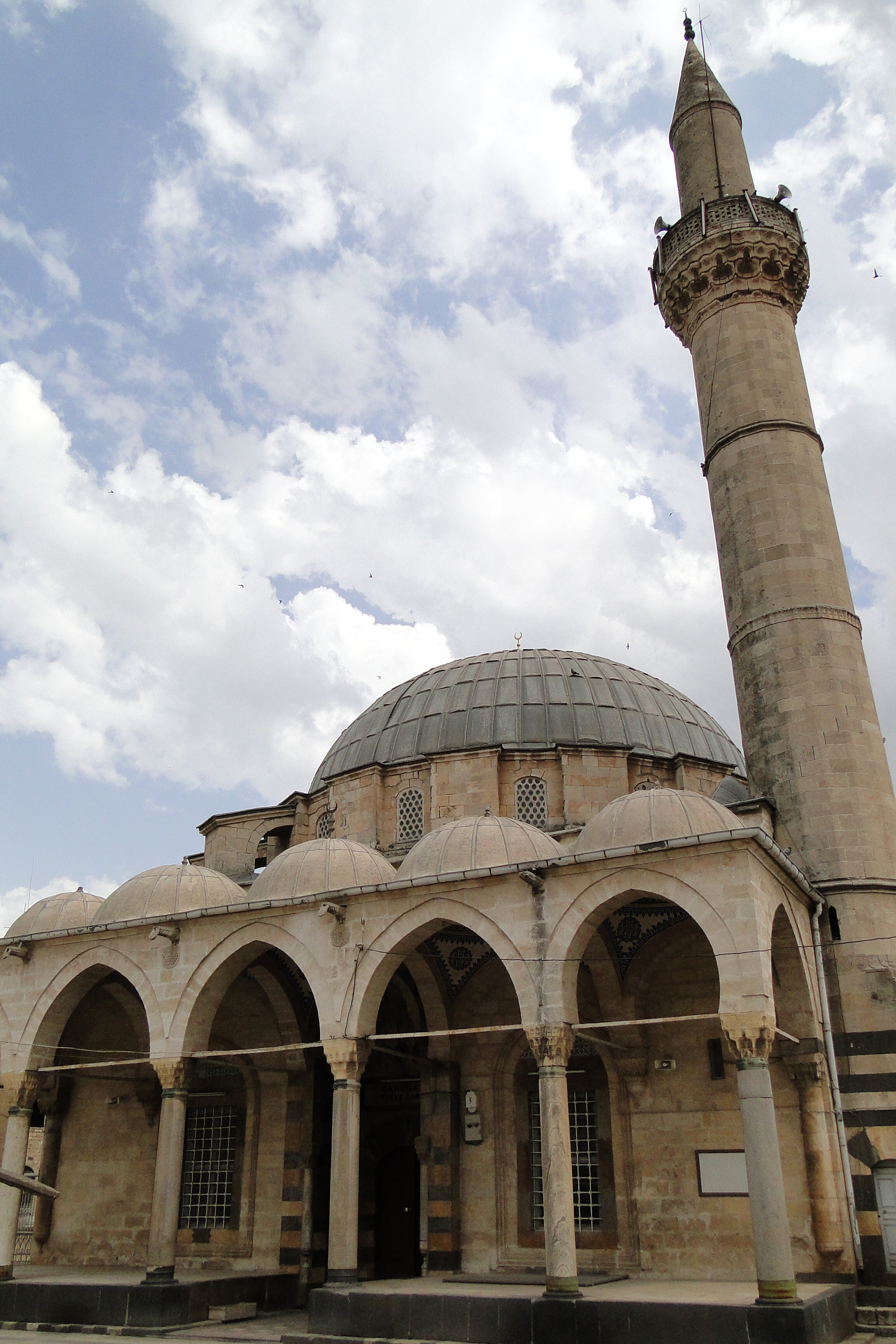
Exterior of 16th-Century Tekke Mosque

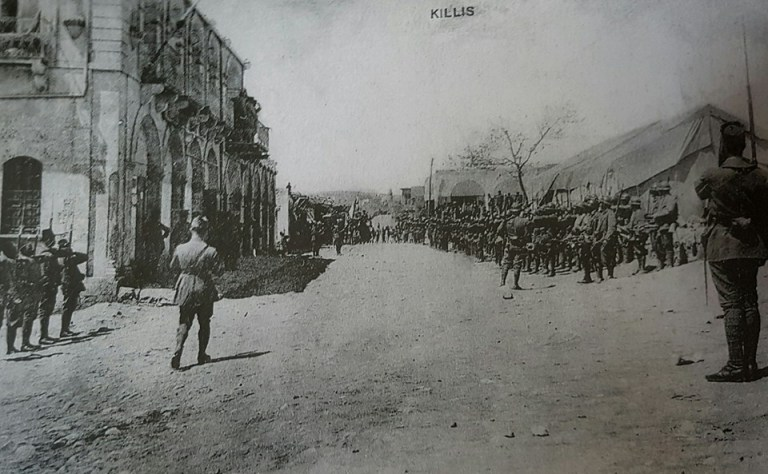
French Occupation Army in Kilis, 1918-22.

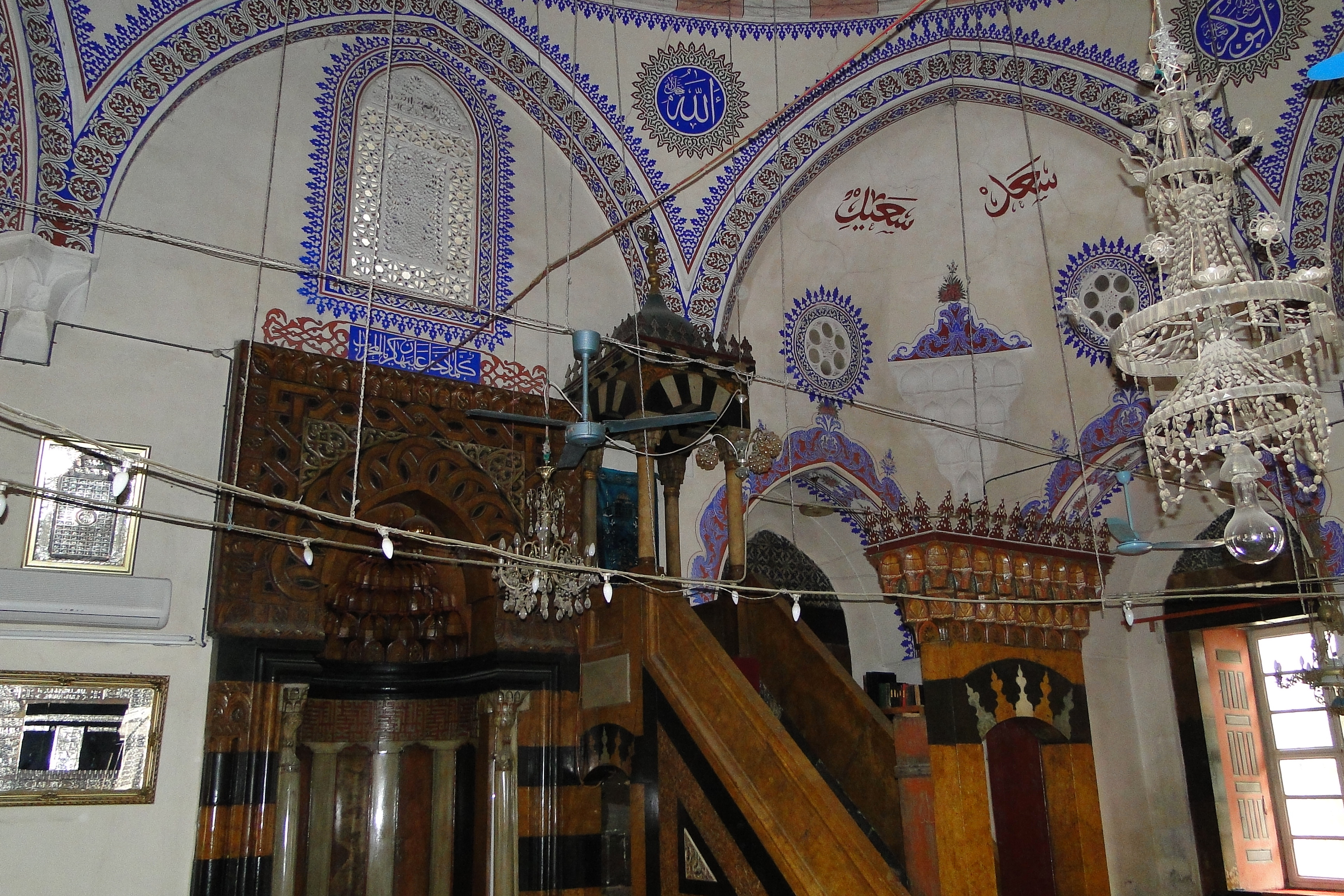
Interior of Tekke Mosque

Although there aren't any definite information related to its foundation, today's Kilis mainly developed and became urbanized during the Ottoman period. However, traces of important cities found in the near surroundings of Kilis and the historical documents prove that important centres were always present here in every period. In the tablets belonging to the Assyrian period, the name 'Ki-li-zi' is written in cuneiform and a city named as "Ciliza Sive Urnagiganti" during the Roman Empire period is mentioned.

In addition to centers such as Kirus antique city, Oylum Höyük, Ravanda Castle, Ilezi and Tarzime Han, many other residential areas starting from the Neolithic period have also been discovered in the surrounding of Kilis as a result of archaeological surface explorations. Hittite, Greek, Persian, Roman, Byzantine, Crusader, Mamluk and Ottoman periods were experienced in the region respectively.

During the late 12th and centuries the Kilis and Aroud became the seat of the Emirate of Kilis, a Kurdish-ruled emirate established c. 1181/1183 under the aegis of the Ayyubid dynasty. The emirate continued in varying degrees of autonomy through the Mamluk period and into the early years of the Ottoman era until its final incorporation c. 1610.

As a result of the researchers, it has been determined that the 2 oldest structures (Ulu Mosque, 1388 and Katrancı Mosque, 1460) in the city center of Kilis belong to the Mamluk Period. Besides these two mosques approximately 135 monumental structures have being constructed since 1516 during the Ottoman Period.

The population of Kilis was 20.000 and it was a city in which production, commerce and cultural functions were developed at the end of the 19th century and it was also a center in which agricultural products (such as grapes, cereals etc.) cultivated in nearly 500 villages around it was processed and industrial products were produced and marketed.

As in the whole Ottoman geography, members of the three major religions are living here together and culture and art are highly developed. 37 mosques, 14 small mosques, 4 Dervish Lodges, 8 madrasahs, 4 churches, 1 synagogue, 31 fountains, 5 Turkish baths, 40 coffee houses, 5 pharmacies and 5 drinking houses that were present in the city at the end of the 19th century give information about the social and cultural structure here. Poetry, music and handicrafts and especially architecture was developed.

Kilis was part of the Aleppo Vilayet of the Ottoman Empire until the First World War, after which it passed to the Republic of Turkey. There was also an Armenian and Jewish community.

Being a border town, Kilis has long had a reputation for smuggling and drug trafficking. Although this has apparently been reduced, even today cigarettes, spirits and cheap electrical items can be bought for cash at low prices. During the Syrian Civil War, the city became a target of continuous rocket attacks by ISIL. in April 2016, the town was struck by rockets fired by the Islamic State killing 21 people and injuring others. Öncüpınar Accommodation Facility is near the town.

== Demographics ==
Zakariya al-Qazwini mentioned Kilis as a Sunni Turkoman village in Athar al-Bilad. In his magazine from 1844, William Harrison Ainsworth included Kilis as a settlement of 12 thousand people, mostly composed of Turkomans and some Armenians, Arabs, and Osmanli. In 1850, Francis Rawdon Chesney mentioned that Kilis was chiefly inhabited by Turkomans, who were agriculturists and carriers, and also Armenians, Turks, and Arabs, totaling to 12 thousand people. In 1869, American missionaries noted that the prevalent language in Kilis was Turkish unlike Aleppo, while Arabic was mostly spoken by the Greeks of the town, who also understood Turkish but didn't prefer the language. In 1911, Kilis was reported to be a town of 20 thousand inhabitants, mainly composed of Circassians, Turkomans, and Arabs. In 1914, the kaza of Kilis consisted of 78,905 Muslims, 434 Greeks, 3,934 Armenians, 775 Jews, 376 Armenian Catholics, and 390 Protestants.

== Geography ==
Kilis is surrounded by three important cities, Gaziantep, Antakya, and Aleppo, and located at the crossroads of Anatolia and Syria. As a result of its proximity to the Mediterranean Sea, it is located in a region where the climate transitions from a Mediterranean to a continental character. It is also located on the Fertile Crescent, which has been home to settlements since the very beginning of history.

The Öncüpınar Syrian border crossing is 5 km (3 mi) to the south and the large city of Gaziantep is 60 km (37 mi) to the north. Indeed, until 1996 Kilis was a district of Gaziantep Province, being made into a province by Tansu Çiller following an open vote-winning gambit in the 1995 general election.

The municipality consists of 76 neighbourhoods, including Öncüpınar and Oylum.

== Cuisine ==
The local kebab known as Kilis Tava is renowned, and also the breads, baklava, künefe and stuffed vegetables.

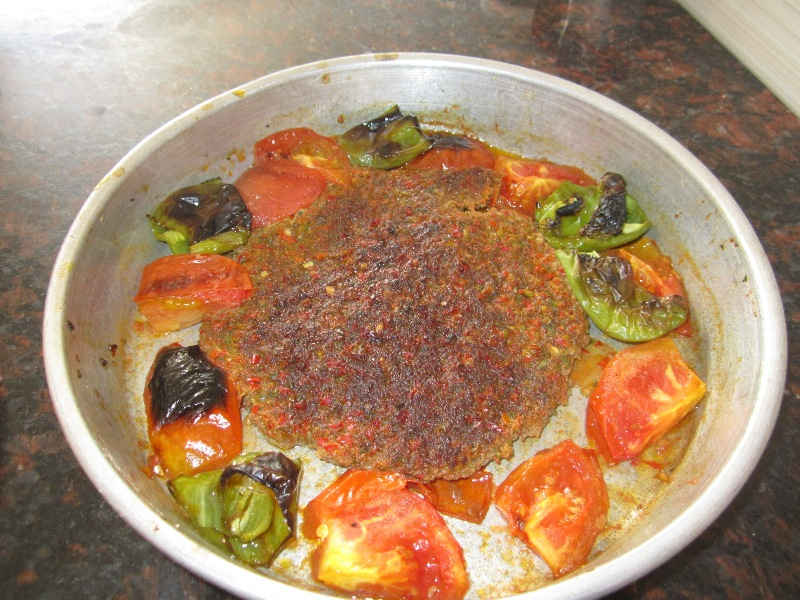
Kilis Tava

== Education ==
Kilis 7 Aralık University is located in Kilis and has around 8,000 undergraduate and graduate students.

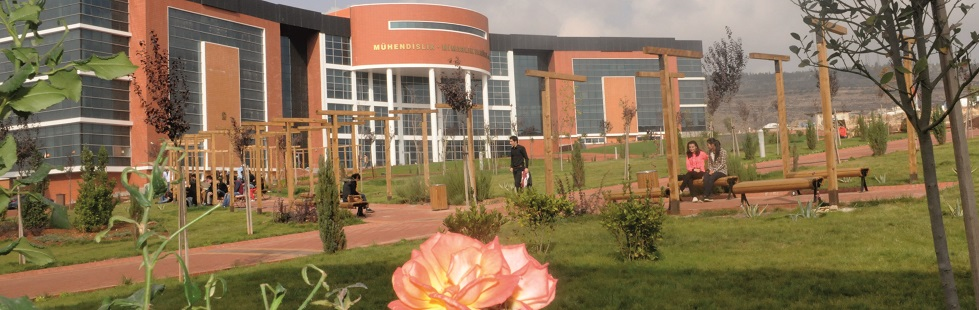
Kilis 7 Aralık University

== Places of interest ==
Sights in the town include a number of Ottoman mosques and stone houses with courtyards and elaborate carved wooden fittings.

=== Mosques ===
- Canbolat or Tekke, built in the 16th century.
- Muallak, built in the 16th century.
- Hacı Derviş, built in 1551.
- Şeyhler or Şeyh Süleyman, built in 1655.
- Hindioğlu, built in 1664.
- Akcurun, built in the 16th or 17th century.
- Şeyh, built in 1569.
- Şeyh Hilal, the minaret was built in 1641.
- Katrancı or Alacalı, the present structure was rebuilt in 1962.
- Murtaza, built in 1659 repaired in 1948.
- Cüneyne, built in 1569.

=== Mausoleums (Türbe) ===
- The Mausoleum of Sheikh Mansur
- The Mausoleum of Sheikh Muhammed Bedevi (Rıttali)
- The Mausoleum of Sheikh Muhammed Ensari

=== Dervish lodges (Tekke) ===
- Shurahbil bin Hasanah Dervish Lodge and Mausoleum

=== Turkish baths (Hamam) ===
- Old (Eski) Baths
- Paşa Baths
- Tuğlu (Daltaban Pasha) Baths

== Climate ==
Kilis has a hot summer Mediterranean climate (Köppen climate classification Csa), with very hot, dry and long summers and cool and rainy winters, with occasional snowfall.

Highest recorded temperature: 47.6 °C (117.7 °F) on 14 August 2023
Lowest recorded temperature: −12.0 °C (10.4 °F) on 19 January 1964 and 2 February 1967

Climate data for Kilis (normals 1991-2020, extremes 1959-present)
Month	Jan	Feb	Mar	Apr	May	Jun	Jul	Aug	Sep	Oct	Nov	Dec	Year
Record high °C (°F)	20.9 (69.6)	25.1 (77.2)	30.1 (86.2)	35.4 (95.7)	40.2 (104.4)	42.5 (108.5)	44.2 (111.6)	47.6 (117.7)	42.5 (108.5)	36.5 (97.7)	29.9 (85.8)	26.3 (79.3)	47.6 (117.7)
Mean daily maximum °C (°F)	9.8 (49.6)	11.8 (53.2)	16.4 (61.5)	21.1 (70.0)	27.7 (81.9)	33.1 (91.6)	36.5 (97.7)	36.6 (97.9)	32.9 (91.2)	26.6 (79.9)	17.9 (64.2)	11.6 (52.9)	23.5 (74.3)
Daily mean °C (°F)	6.1 (43.0)	7.4 (45.3)	11.2 (52.2)	15.8 (60.4)	21.1 (70.0)	25.8 (78.4)	28.6 (83.5)	28.6 (83.5)	25.4 (77.7)	20.5 (68.9)	13.1 (55.6)	7.8 (46.0)	17.6 (63.7)
Mean daily minimum °C (°F)	2.9 (37.2)	3.8 (38.8)	6.8 (44.2)	10.7 (51.3)	15.2 (59.4)	19.2 (66.6)	21.9 (71.4)	22.2 (72.0)	19.3 (66.7)	15.2 (59.4)	9.0 (48.2)	4.6 (40.3)	12.6 (54.6)
Record low °C (°F)	−12.0 (10.4)	−12.0 (10.4)	−6.8 (19.8)	−4.4 (24.1)	1.5 (34.7)	7.4 (45.3)	13.1 (55.6)	12.9 (55.2)	8.5 (47.3)	0.4 (32.7)	−4.4 (24.1)	−8.0 (17.6)	−12.0 (10.4)
Average precipitation mm (inches)	80.6 (3.17)	71.4 (2.81)	60.6 (2.39)	44.0 (1.73)	26.7 (1.05)	11.4 (0.45)	4.1 (0.16)	4.9 (0.19)	11.2 (0.44)	32.2 (1.27)	59.1 (2.33)	87.2 (3.43)	493.4 (19.42)
Average precipitation days	12.3	10.87	10.4	8.87	5.93	1.47	0.37	0.37	1.73	5.43	7.7	11.1	76.54
Average snowy days	2.3	0.6	0.5	0	0	0	0	0	0	0	0	0.6	4
Average relative humidity (%)	66.8	63.1	57.7	53.1	46.3	42.3	44.8	47.2	45.6	46.4	54.5	66.3	52.8
Mean monthly sunshine hours	112.6	132.4	187.6	228.3	286.1	334.5	358.3	337.7	292.6	226.8	158.7	102.1	2,757.6
Source 1: Devlet Meteoroloji İşleri Genel Müdürlüğü (extremes)
Source 2: NOAA NCEI(humidity, sun 1991-2020), Meteoman
