= 2016 World Armwrestling Championship =

International arm wrestling competition

- Location: Blagoevgrad, Bulgaria
- Dates: 1 – 10 October

The 2016 World Armwrestling Championship was the 38th edition of the World Armwrestling Championship held in Blagoevgrad, Bulgaria from 1 to 10 October.

== Medal summary ==
=== Medal table ===
* Host nation (Bulgaria)

Rank	Nation	Gold	Silver	Bronze	Total
1	Russia	8	10	9	27
2	Kazakhstan	7	6	3	16
3	Georgia	5	7	8	20
4	Bulgaria	3	3	2	8
5	Brazil	2	2	0	4
6	Ukraine	2	1	5	8
7	Armenia	2	1	1	4
8	Slovakia	2	1	0	3
9	Turkey	1	2	2	5
10	Sweden	1	1	1	3
11	Lithuania	1	1	0	2
12	Kyrgyzstan	1	0	1	2
13	Azerbaijan	1	0	0	1
14	Uzbekistan	0	1	0	1
15	Latvia	0	0	2	2
16	Belarus	0	0	1	1
16	Hungary	0	0	1	1
Totals (17 entries)		36	36	36	108

=== Medalists ===
==== Men ====
===== Left arm =====
Event	Gold	Silver	Bronze
55 kg	Islam Reiissov; Kazakhstan	Levani Pogosiani; Georgia	Mussa Bayramkulov; Russia
60 kg	Vali Farajov; Kazakhstan	Imeda Tchintcharauli; Georgia	Roman Tserekaev; Russia
65 kg	Jambuli Vibliani; Georgia	Shokhrukh Abduyokubov; Uzbekistan	Merab Kakabadze; Georgia
70 kg	Emil Amirshadyan; Armenia	Khetag Dzitiev; Russia	Valentin Gospodinov; Bulgaria
75 kg	Vrezh Sedrakyan; Armenia	Magzhan Shamiyev; Kazakhstan	Dzmitry Mikhei; Belarus
80 kg	Atsamaz Urtaev; Russia	Zurab Tavberidze; Georgia	Ruslan Nabiev; Russia
85 kg	Oleh Zhokh; Ukraine	Artem Tainov; Russia	Elchin Binatov; Georgia
90 kg	Ievgenii Prudnyk; Ukraine	Yordan Tsonev; Bulgaria	Irakli Gamtenadze; Georgia
100 kg	Georgiy Dzeranov; Kazakhstan	Vitali Laletin; Russia	Anton Kaliazin; Ukraine
110 kg	Krasimir Kostadinov; Bulgaria	Ivan Matyushenko; Russia	Evgenii Lukıanov; Kyrgyzstan
+110 kg	Levan Saginashvili; Georgia	Dmitrii Silaev; Russia	Arif Ertem; Turkey

===== Right arm =====
Event	Gold	Silver	Bronze
55 kg	Levani Pogosiani; Georgia	Aleks Pretsuashvili; Georgia	Maksym Marchenko; Ukraine
60 kg	Nurdaulet Aidarkhan; Kazakhstan	Vali Farajov; Kazakhstan	Ashot Adamyan; Armenia
65 kg	Gismat Vakilov; Azerbaijan	Jambuli Vibliani; Georgia	Maksim Yandubaev; Russia
70 kg	Artur Makarov; Russia	Emil Amirshadyan; Armenia	Sergey Yermolchik; Kazakhstan
75 kg	Shynbolat Raikhanov; Kazakhstan	Magzhan Shamiyev; Kazakhstan	Davit Samushiau; Georgia
80 kg	Oğuzhan Koçak; Turkey	Zurab Tavberidze; Georgia	Evgenii Mirzasaidov; Russia
85 kg	Sasho Andreev; Bulgaria	Spartak Zoloev; Russia	Ivan Lukyanchuk; Ukraine
90 kg	Khadzhimurat Zoloev; Russia	Petro Marharint; Bulgaria	Irakli Gamtenadze; Georgia
100 kg	Vitali Laletin; Russia	Georgiy Dzeranov; Kazakhstan	Vasili Dautashvili; Georgia
110 kg	Evgenii Lukianov; Kyrgyzstan	Mitko Petrov; Bulgaria	Andrei Kaizer; Russia
+110 kg	Genadi Kvikvinia; Georgia	Levan Saginashvili; Georgia	Arif Ertem; Turkey

==== Women ====
===== Left arm =====
Event	Gold	Silver	Bronze
50 kg	Snezhana Babayieva; Slovakia	Esra Kiraz; Turkey	Aigerim Karamanova; Kazakhstan
55 kg	Alina Volkova; Russia	Viktoria Iliushyna; Ukraine	Dimitrina Dimitrova; Bulgaria
60 kg	Ekaterina Afoniva; Russia	Lucia Debnarova; Slovakia	Irina Driaeva; Georgia
65 kg	Olga Shlizhevskaya; Kazakhstan	Fia Reisek; Sweden	Irına Gladkaia; Russia
70 kg	Gabriela Vascongelos; Brazil	Oxana Pismennaya; Kazakhstan	Brigitta Ivanfi; Hungary
80 kg	Evgenia Fomina; Russia	Irına Makeeva; Russia	Nino Makharadze; Georgia
+80 kg	Antonina Lissyanskaya; Kazakhstan	Egle Vaitkute; Lithuania	Zanna Gingule; Latvia

===== Right arm =====
Event	Gold	Silver	Bronze
50 kg	Snezhana Babayieva; Slovakia	Esra Kiraz; Turkey	Maryna Levchenko; Ukraine
55 kg	Dimitrina Dimitrova; Bulgaria	Chris Souza; Brazil	Alina Volkova; Russia
60 kg	Irina Driaeva; Georgia	Tatiane Faria; Brazil	Viktoria Karlsson; Sweden
65 kg	Fia Reisek; Sweden	Olga Shlizhevskaya; Kazakhstan	Irına Gladkaia; Russia
70 kg	Gabriela Vascongelos; Brazil	Viktoria Voronina; Russia	Oxana Pismennaya; Kazakhstan
80 kg	Irına Makeeva; Russia	Evgenia Fomina; Russia	Oksana Diachenko; Ukraine
+80 kg	Egle Vaitkute; Lithuania	Alina Samotoy; Russia	Zanna Gingule; Latvia
