= Kilis 7 Aralık University =

Public university located in Kilis, Turkey

- Kilis 7 Aralık Üniversitesi
- Motto: Aydınlık Yarınlar İçin, Kilis 7 Aralık Üniversitesi
- Motto in English: For a Bright Future, Kilis 7 Aralık University
- Type: Public
- Established: 2007
- Affiliations: Erasmus+ Programme, The Magna Charta, Higher Education Council, TÜBİTAK (The Scientific and Technological Research Council of Turkey)
- Rector: Prof. Dr. Mustafa Doğan Karacoşkun
- Faculty: 250
- Administrative staff: 300
- Students: 11,000
- Location: Mehmet Sanlı Mah. Doğan Güreş Paşa Bul. No:134 KİLİS / TURKEY, Kilis, Turkey
- Campus: Urban
- Colors: Turquoise and blue
- Nickname: KIYU
- Website: Official website

Kilis 7 Aralık University (Turkish: Kilis 7 Aralık Üniversitesi) is located in the city of Kilis, in southeastern Turkey. The name of the university comes from the date when the city of Kilis was liberated from occupation during the Turkish War of Independence – December 7, 1921 (Turkish: 7 Aralık 1921).

== History ==
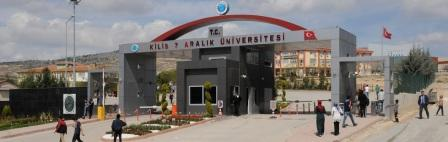
University Main Gate

Kilis 7 Aralık University was founded on May 29, 2007, by the Turkish government. The Yusuf Şerefoğlu School of Health was founded in 1997, and Kilisli Muallim Rıfat Education Faculty was founded in 1998. They were followed by Faculty of Arts and Sciences in 2003; the Faculty of Economics and Administrative Sciences, Vocational School of Health, and Graduate Schools of Science and Social Sciences in 2007; the Faculty of Engineering and Architecture in 2010; and the College of Physical Education and Sports (BESYO) and Faculty of Theology in 2012.

The University serves more than 8,000 undergraduate and graduate students from around the world in six faculties, two vocational schools, and three institutes, with 250 teaching staff in Karatas and on the main campus.

Kilis 7 Aralık University has had the Erasmus University Charter since 2009. Accordingly, the ECTS is recognized for all faculties. The university's strategy focuses on extending and improving cooperation with foreign partners. The introduction of ECTS in undergraduate programs has facilitated accreditation. The university actively encourages its students to participate in EU student exchange programs.

Because Kilis 7 Aralık University participates in the Bologna process, the students earn a diploma and diploma supplement (DS) that are valid throughout the world.

== Basic facts ==
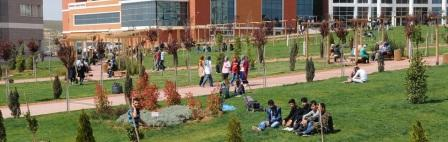
Students at Kilis 7 Aralık University Square

The university has many aspects in common with other large universities, including a university campus with an additional city location, broad course options, student mobility programs (Erasmus+, Mevlana (RUMI), and Farabi), dormitories, and social life and sports facilities.

== Education research and practice centers ==
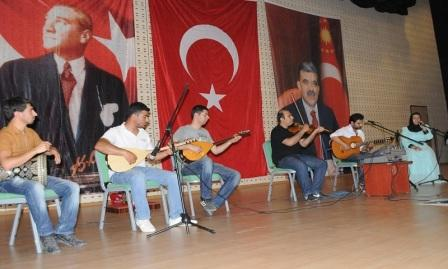
Folk Music Concert by Students at Kilis 7 Aralık University

The university's research centers include its Continuing Education Center (KÜSEM), Distance Education Center (KUZEM), Agricultural Research and Application Center (TUAM), Language Teaching Application and Research Center (DÖMER), Research Center for Middle Eastern Studies, and Application and Research Center for Computer Science.

== Social facilities ==
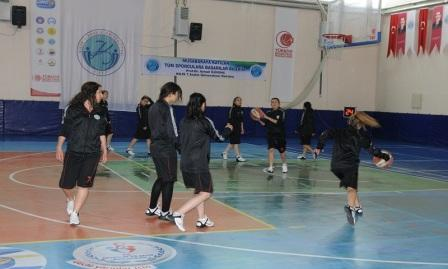
Basketball Match at Kilis 7 Aralık University

Social and sports facilities include basketball and tennis courts, football fields, an outdoor sports park, a fitness saloon, a swimming pool, an indoor sports facility, a theatre hall, the Kilis House, a music room, an Ebru (Turkish water painting, also known as paper marbling) art room, and an exhibition hall.

== Student clubs ==
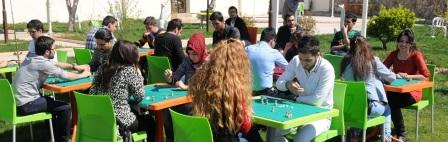
Peçiç tournament, a traditional/local game, at Kilis 7 Aralık University

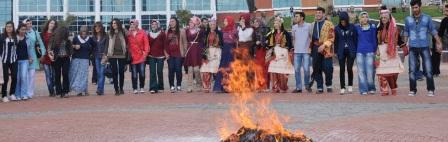
Kilis 7 Aralık University Nevruz Festival

Student clubs include:

- Community Volunteers Club
- Culture, Arts and Literature Club
- Travel and Organizing Club
- Youth and the Red Crescent Club
- Photography Club
- Student Assistance and Solidarity Club
- Career Club
- Attraction Club
- Turkish Culture Club
- Health Club
- Fit Youth Club
- Textile Club
- Scientific and Technical Club
- Aviation Club
- Music Club

== Programs and departments ==
=== Kilisli Muallim Rıfat Faculty of Education ===
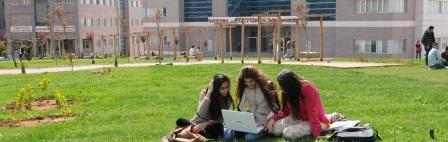
University Square

- Science Education
- Pre-School (Earlychildhood) Education
- Elementary (Primary) Education
- Social Studies Education
- Turkish Language Education
- Special Education
- Elementary Education Mathematics Teaching

=== Faculty of Arts and Sciences ===
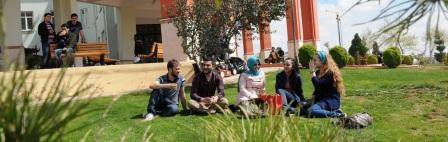
Arts and Sciences Faculty Building

- Arabic Language and Literature
- Geography
- Philosophy
- Molecular Biology and Genetics
- History
- Turkish Language and Literature

=== Faculty of Economics and Administrative Sciences ===
- Economics
- Business Administration
- Political Science and Public Administration
- International Trade and Logistics

=== Faculty of Engineering and Architecture ===
- Civil Engineering
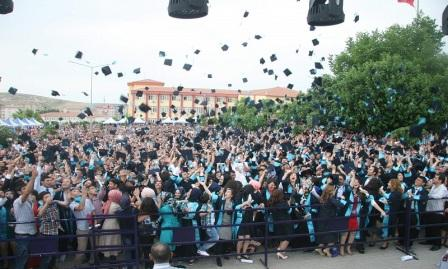
  rKilis 7 Aralık University Graduation Party
- Food Engineering
- Electrical and Electronics Engineering

=== Faculty of Theology ===
- Theology

=== Faculty of Agriculture ===
- Horticulture

=== Yusuf Şerefoğlu School of Health ===
- Nursing

=== College of Physical Education and Sports (BESYO) ===
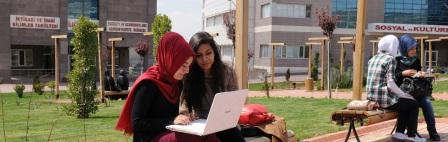
University Square

=== Vocational School of Health ===
- Paramedics
- Medical Documentation and Secretary
- Care of the Elderly
- Opticianry
- Child Development/Care
- Physiotherapy

=== Kilis Vocational School ===
- Gardening
- Cookery
- Computer Programming
- Foreign Trade
- Electricity
- Gas and Installation Technology
- Construction Technology
- Business Management
- Occupational Health and Safety
- Machine Design
- Accounting and Taxation Applications
- Landscape and Ornamental Plants
- Textile Technology
- Medicinal and Aromatic Plants
- Tourism and Hotel Management
- Construction Inspector Training

=== Institute of Science (Graduate School of Science) ===
- Biology
- Physics
- Civil Engineering
- Chemistry
- Mathematics
- Electrical and Electronics Engineering
- Science Education

=== Institute of Social Sciences (Graduate School of Social Sciences) ===
==== Masters Program ====
- Elementary School Religious Culture and Moral Knowledge Education
- Business Administration (MBA)
- History
- Economics
- Business Administration

==== Doctoral Program ====
- Business Administration

== Courses in English and Turkish ==
Courses are available in English and Turkish.

== Grading system ==
=== Degrees ===
Students who complete 120 ECTS credits and have a minimum 2.00 out of 4.00 grade point average (GPA) will earn an associate degree.

Students who complete 240 ECTS credits and have a minimum 2.00 out of 4.00 grade point average (GPA) will earn a bachelor's degree (B.A.).

The Ph.D. degree is awarded to students who have successfully completed all required courses with a GPA of at least 3.00 out of 4.00, and have prepared and defended a thesis.

=== Grading scale ===
The European Credit Transfer and Accumulation System (ECTS System) is used.

Students who receive any grade of CC or higher (CC, CB, BB, BA, or AA) for a course are considered to have satisfactorily completed the course. Students who receive a grade of either DC or DD in one or more courses can be considered successful only it their cumulative grade point average (CGPA) is 2.00 or higher at the end of the semester. Student who receive grades of FD or FF are considered unsuccessful. N/A means that the student never attended to courses and failed. Non-credit courses are evaluated as S (satisfactory) or U (Unsatisfactory). The grades S and U are not considered while calculating CGPA.

ECTS, the European Credit Transfer System, was created by the European Commission in order to offer standard procedures for academic recognition of studies abroad. A student can earn 30 ECTS credits for a semester and 60 ECTS credits for an entire academic year.

== Teaching and learning methods ==
The teaching methods used at Kilis 7 Aralık University vary with class size. The early years can be characterized by large groups. Almost all the modules require smaller interactive groups. For Erasmus+ students, if there are not enough students registered for the courses, individual study is often used.

== Library ==
The main library includes reading rooms and an Internet access center equipped with scanners, copy machines, and printers. The library offers:

- 40,000 books in an open shelf system and various periodicals
- Databases for research
- A book reading system for visually impaired people
- YORDAM Automation System for resource scan and access
- The KITS inter-library book loan system
- A lounge with daily newspapers

University Library opening hours are 8:00 am to 20:00 pm.

== Information technologies ==
The Communication and information Technologies Department provides computer facilities and information technologies for all staff and students. Each department has its own computer lab for students and all classrooms have wireless Internet access, a computer, and a projector.

== Health care ==
The Center for Medico-Social Unit is on the ground floor of Sosyal-Kültürel Merkez building on the main campus. In the unit, basic health services are provided for students, such as glucose and blood pressure measurement. It also provides first aid services for all students at the university.

== Accommodation ==
A 100-student dormitory for international students is available in Karatas campus.

There are also private student dorms around the campus that provide affordable accommodation to students.

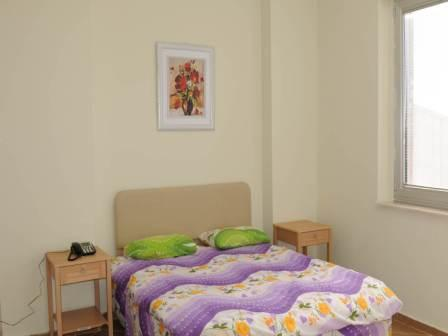
Kilis 7 Aralık University Guest House

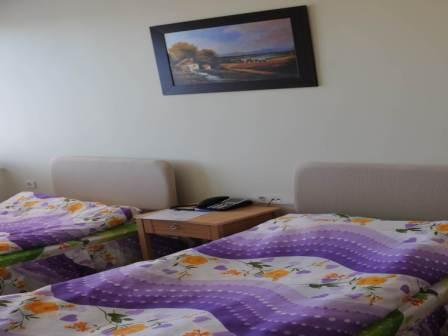
Kilis 7 Aralık University Guest House

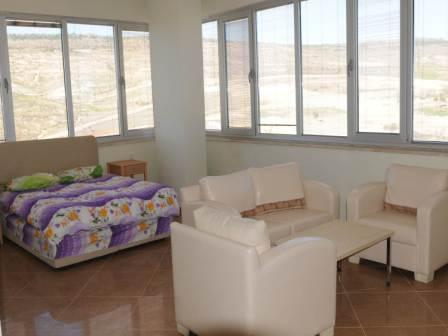
Kilis 7 Aralık University Guest House

== Disability support ==
This unit at the campus supports handicapped students to minimize challenges encountered during their education and campus life and improve the environment around them. The lifts, ramps, toilets, sidewalks, and roads at the campus are accessible for disabled students. The book-reading system for visually impaired students is available at the main library. The ring service is available for students who are physically disabled.

== Food and drink ==
- Student Dining Hall: There is an on-campus dining hall with a capacity of 1,000 students. Lunch and dinner, including traditional Turkish food, are served daily.
- Kilis House Social Facility: Breakfast and lunch are served in a renovated authentic Kilis House.
- Cafeterias: Student cafeterias serve hot and cold drinks. They also offer various food options in every faculty.

== Transportation ==
There are intercity coaches in Kilis and Gaziantep to travel to any city in Turkey. Kilis bus station is in the city center and easily accessible to the students.

When traveling by coach/bus, the Özgür Dolmuş (Midi Bus) at Gaziantep Otogar (Central Station for coaches) is taken to go to Kilis. It costs 7 TL (€2).

The distance from Kilis 7 Aralık University to the nearest airport (Gaziantep) is 40 km.

Local public transportation consists of midi buses (Dolmus) operating from 6:00 am to 23:00 pm. The price of a ticket is 1.25 TL for students (€0.40).

== Affiliations ==
The university is a member of the Caucasus University Association.
