= Gümüşhane University =

Public university in Gümüşhane, Turkey

Gumüşhane University
- Established: 2008
- Location: Gümüşhane, Turkey
- Website: Official website

Gümüşhane University is a state university located in Gümüşhane, Türkiye. It was established on May 31, 2008 by separating from Black Sea Technical University. The name of the Faculty of Engineering was changed to the Faculty of Engineering and Natural Sciences with the decision of the Council of Ministers published in the Official Gazette dated 26.04.2013 and numbered 28629. Faculty of Tourism was established. Gümüşhane University continues to grow rapidly.

Köse İrfan Can Vocational School, Kelkit Aydın Doğan Vocational School, Şiran Mustafa Beyaz Vocational School, Torul Vocational School, Kürtün Vocational School, Central Library, Social Facilities, Gümüşhane Vocational School, Physical Education and Sports Vocational School, Health Services Vocational School, Faculty of Theology, Faculty of Engineering and Natural Sciences, Faculty of Letters, Faculty of Economics and Administrative Sciences, and Faculty of Health Sciences have Wireless access to the eduroam network.
