= Bayburt University =

Public university in Bayburt, Turkey

- Bayburt Üniversitesi
- Type: Public
- Established: 2008
- President: Prof. Dr. Selçuk COŞKUN
- Academic staff: 263
- Undergraduates: 5123
- Postgraduates: 227
- Location: Bayburt, Turkey
- Member of: EUA
- Colors: blue and turquoise
- Website: bayburt.edu.tr

Bayburt University (BU; in Turkish, Bayburt Üniversitesi, commonly referred to as BÜ) is a public research university in the city of Bayburt, Turkey. The research and education conducted by the university have an emphasis on engineering and natural sciences.

The official language of instruction at BU is Turkish. The university's Demirözü Vocational School, Aydıntepe Vocational School, Baberti Complex and Dede Korkut Complex have wireless access to the eduroam network.

== History ==
Bayburt University was founded under the city name as a new university in Bayburt, in 2008. (Law no. 5765 Approval Date: 22/05/2008)

This University Includes:

a) The Faculty of Economic and Administrative Sciences, Faculty of Engineering, School of Education

b) A Vocational High School and a School of Higher Health Services,

c) Graduate School (Science Institute and the Institute of Social Sciences)

Second Cycle Programmes (Master's Degree)

Institute of Science

- Mechanical Engineering
- Civil Engineering
- Food Engineering
- Civil Engineering

Institute of Social Sciences

- Elementary Religious Culture and Moral Education
- Business Administration
- Elementary Mathematics Education
- Primary Teacher
- Basic Islamic Sciences
- Business Administration

First Cycle Programmes (Bachelor's Degree)

Bayburt Education Faculty

- Classroom Teaching
- Classroom Teaching S.E.
- Science Teacher
- Science Teacher S.E.
- Elementary Mathematics Education
- Turkish Education

Faculty of Economics and Administrative Sciences

- Economics
- Economics S.E.
- Business Administration
- Business Administration S.E.

Faculty of Engineering

- Mechanical Engineering
- Mechanical Engineering S.E.
- Food Engineering
- Food Engineering S.E.
- Civil Engineering S.E.
- Civil Engineering

Faculty of Theology

- Theology
- Theology S.E.
- Religious Culture and Moral Education
- Religious Culture and Moral Education S.E.

Short Cycle Programmes (Associate degree)

Bayburt Vocational School

- Accounting and Taxation S.E.
- Accounting and Taxation
- Office Management and Secretarial
- Marketing and Advertising
- Marketing and Advertising S.E.
- Foreign Trade
- Foreign Trade S.E.
- Chemistry and Chemical Processing Technology
- Chemistry and Chemical Processing Technology S.E.
- Management and Organization
- Management and Organization S.E.
- Computer Technology and Programming S.E.
- Computer Technology and Programming
- Electricity and Energy
- Electricity and Energy S.E.
- Finance, Banking and Insurance
- Finance, Banking and Insurance S.E.
- Finance, Banking and Insurance
- Electronics and Automation S.E.
- Electronics and Automation

Bayburt Vocational School of Health Services

- S.E.

== Affiliations ==
The university is a member of the Caucasus University Association. The University is also the partner of College of Law in Wroclaw.
