= 2016 Islamic State rocket attacks on Turkey =

Terrorist incident in Turkey

Rocket attacks on Kilis
- Part of the Turkey–Islamic State conflict
Date	8 March 2016 – 8 September 2016 (6 months)
Location	Kilis, Turkey; ISIS territory in Northern Syria
Status	With the start of the Turkish military intervention in Syria, ISIS is repelled from the Turkey-Syria border.

Belligerents
Turkey: Turkish Armed Forces; Turkish Gendarmerie; General Directorate of Security	(Islamic State) ISIS: Military of the Islamic State; Dokumacılar; Al-Sham Province; Al-Barakah

Commanders and leaders
(Turkey) Recep Tayyip Erdoğan (Turkey) Hulusi Akar	(Islamic State) Abu Bakr al-Baghdadi

Casualties and losses
None	54 killed
- 22 civilians (12 Syrian) killed and 80 wounded

From March to September 2016, the Turkish city of Kilis and surrounding areas came under continuous rocket bombardments by the Islamic State, resulting in retaliatory strikes by the Turkish military on ISIL militants located at the ISIL-occupied areas in North Syria. Since January 2016 and until early May, more than seventy rockets fired from across the border by ISIL had hit this town, killing at least 21 people.

== Background ==
Being a border town, Kilis has long had a reputation for smuggling and drug trafficking. Kilis is located 5 km (3 miles) from the Syrian border, where Syrian al-Bab district is located, under control of ISIL jihadists since 2014. Almost 100,000 Turkish citizens live in Kilis, but the population has been more than doubled by the arrival of Syrian refugees.

== Timeline ==
=== March ===
On 8 March, two people were killed, including a toddler, while two others were wounded as eight rocket projectiles hit Kilis. The projectiles hit the neighborhoods of Ekrem Çetin, Kazım Karabekir, Turgut Özal, and Tibilevler. Three people, including two children, were wounded after a piece of shrapnel hit an automobile on the Kilis highway. In response, the Turkish military retaliated against ISIL with artillery fire

=== April ===
11 April 2016 - 4 people were injured as a result of rocket barrage on Kilis.

On 19 April 2016, the town was struck by rockets fired by Islamic State of Iraq and the Levant (ISIL) from ISIL-occupied Syrian territories, killing 4 people and injuring 8 others.

On April 22, three people were killed and six others were wounded when ISIL rocket projectiles hit the border province of Kilis.

On April 24, two rockets fired from ISIL hit Kilis. 16 people were wounded, six of whom were Syrian citizens.

On April 25, the Turkish General Staff announced that eight militants of the ISIL were killed the same day when Turkish artillery units shelled a missile launcher. Also, the same day the U.S.-led coalition hit ISIL targets in northern Syria, located directly across from the southeastern province of Kilis.

On April 26, according to the Turkish army, two missile launchers belonging to the ISIL were destroyed in an artillery strike which also killed 11 ISIL militants. This was the second such initiative by the Turkish Army in the past two days.

On April 27, according to Turkish sources, 13 ISIL militants were killed when Turkish artillery units shelled a building in the Duwaibik region to the north of Aleppo. The building used by ISIL militants collapsed, killing 13 militants inside and injuring another seven. Around 150 Katyusha rocket projectiles stored on the ground floor of the building were also destroyed. The same day Turkish artillery units also shelled two missile launchers and killed 11 ISIL militants.

On April 28, five mortar shells targeting a border military post in the Karkamış district of the southeastern province of Gaziantep were fired by the ISIL. 11 ISIL militants were killed in Turkish artillery shellings following the attack according to Turkish sources.

On April 29, two rocket projectiles fired by the ISIL hit the border province of Kilis in Turkey.

=== May ===
On 12 May, it was reported that Turkish artillery pounded Islamic State targets in northern Syria and the U.S.-led coalition carried out air strikes, killing 28 militants near a Turkish border town of Kilis, repeatedly hit by rocket fire.

By May 16, Turkish authorities reported at least 21 people had been killed from shelling in Kilis Province as a whole since January, in more than 70 separate incidents.

=== August ===
On August 22, Turkey shelled ISIS positions after three mortar rounds hit Kilis.

== Aftermath ==
On 22 September, a rocket hit a bazaar area in the Canpolat Paşa neighborhood in the afternoon in Kilis injuring eight, including five children and an adult.

On 1 October, two of the three rockets hit a hilly area close to the border while the third one fell into an empty field in the neighborhood of Ekrem Cetin. A police officer was killed and two soldiers were slightly injured during the destruction of an unexploded rocket.

== Responses ==
- NATO: On 19 May 2016, at the foreign ministers meeting to be held in Brussels, NATO Secretary-General Jens Stoltenberg said that the situation in Iraq and Syria as well as Kilis, battered since January by rockets fired by Daesh in Syria, along with measures to counter Russia in Eastern Europe will top the agenda.

== See also ==
- Surface-to-surface missile
