= 2022 World Armwrestling Championship =

2022 World Armwrestling Championship.
- Venue: Amara Resort, Kemer
- Location: Antalya, Turkey
- Dates: 14 – 23 October

The 2022 World Armwrestling Championship was the 43rd edition of the World Armwrestling Championship held in Antalya, Turkey from 14 to 23 October.

== Medal summary ==
=== Medal table ===
* Host nation (Turkey)

Rank	Nation	Gold	Silver	Bronze	Total
1	Kazakhstan	15	14	12	41
2	Turkey*	5	5	5	15
3	Bulgaria	5	3	1	9
4	Sweden	4	1	2	7
5	Slovakia	4	1	1	6
6	Brazil	2	1	1	4
7	Moldova	1	3	1	5
8	Latvia	1	1	1	3
9	Hungary	1	1	0	2
10	Ukraine	0	4	4	8
11	Armenia	0	1	2	3
12	Croatia	0	1	1	2
12	Romania	0	1	1	2
14	Puerto Rico	0	1	0	1
15	United States	0	0	2	2
16	Azerbaijan	0	0	1	1
16	Egypt	0	0	1	1
16	Italy	0	0	1	1
16	Uzbekistan	0	0	1	1
Totals (19 entries)		38	38	38	114

=== Medalists ===
==== Men ====
===== Left arm =====
Event	Gold	Silver	Bronze
55 kg	Yerdaulet Nurmakhan; Kazakhstan	Oraz Bassarov; Kazakhstan	Bora Yıldırım; Turkey
60 kg	Meirambek Yersaiyn; Kazakhstan	Selçuk Özalp; Turkey	Ismayil Mustafayev; Azerbaijan
65 kg	Yerdaulet Sarybay; Kazakhstan	Cleiton Batista; Brazil	Davit Stepanyan; Armenia
70 kg	Salih Emir Koç; Turkey	Evren Serhat Arslan; Turkey	Rodion Nereuta; Moldova
75 kg	Daniel Procopciuc; Moldova	Magzhan Shamiyev; Kazakhstan	Nurdaulet Aidarkhan; Kazakhstan
80 kg	Mikhail Nifontov; Kazakhstan	Oleg Tudorean; Moldova	Davyd Popov; Ukraine
85 kg	Talgat Aktayev; Kazakhstan	Oleh Zhokh; Ukraine	Nedalin Hristov; Bulgaria
90 kg	Sasho Andreev; Bulgaria	Mansur Kambarov; Kazakhstan	Oleksandr Kulishov; Ukraine
100 kg	Kydyrgali Ongarbayev; Kazakhstan	Rino Masich; Croatia	Ihor Pasieka; Ukraine
110 kg	Beket Aitbek; Kazakhstan	Sandris Sedis; Latvia	Murat Efe Kömek; Turkey
+110 kg	Alizhan Muratov; Kazakhstan	Mitko Petrov; Bulgaria	Petro Kychuk; Ukraine

===== Right arm =====
Event	Gold	Silver	Bronze
55 kg	Oraz Bassarov; Kazakhstan	Yerdaulet Nurmakhan; Kazakhstan	Zokhir Fayzullaev; Uzbekistan
60 kg	Dauren Absattar; Kazakhstan	Meirambek Yersaiyn; Kazakhstan	Andria Jeha; Egypt
65 kg	Yerdaulet Sarybay; Kazakhstan	Yusuf Ziya Yıldızoğlu; Turkey	Davit Stepanyan; Armenia
70 kg	Evren Serhat Arslan; Turkey	Vachagan Hovhannisyan; Armenia	Azamat Rakhmet; Kazakhstan
75 kg	Nurdaulet Aidarkhan; Kazakhstan	Daniel Procopciuc; Moldova	Amolins Janis; Latvia
80 kg	Abdulmanaf Tuzuyev; Kazakhstan	Oleg Tudorean; Moldova	Talgat Aktayev; Kazakhstan
85 kg	Bozhidar Simeonov; Bulgaria	Viorel Dobrin; Romania	Bekzat Yessenbay; Kazakhstan
90 kg	Sasho Andreev; Bulgaria	Mansur Kambarov; Kazakhstan	Marius Jurovschi; Romania
100 kg	Krasimir Kostadinov; Bulgaria	Ihor Pasieka; Ukraine	Oğuzhan Kocak; Turkey
110 kg	Sandris Sedis; Latvia	Oleksandr Ilnytskyi; Ukraine	Ivo Krizan; Croatia
+110 kg	Georgi Tsvetkov; Bulgaria	Arif Ertem; Turkey	Manuel Battaglia; Italy

==== Women ====
===== Left arm =====
Event	Gold	Silver	Bronze
50 kg	Sandugash Seidish; Kazakhstan	Anna Hranatova; Bulgaria	Snezhana Babayieva; Slovakia
55 kg	Esra Kiraz; Turkey	Aruzhan Abdullaieva; Kazakhstan	Takhmina Gozhamberdiyeva; Kazakhstan
60 kg	Lucia Debnarova; Slovakia	Aigerim Karamanova; Kazakhstan	Viktoria Karlsson; Sweden
65 kg	Brigitta Ivanfi; Hungary	Rebeka Martinkovicova; Slovakia	Angela Matthews; United States
70 kg	Fia Reisek; Sweden	Deshi Dursayeva; Kazakhstan	Olga Shlizhevskaya; Kazakhstan
80 kg	Anna Gronlund; Sweden	Alena Stanskaya; Kazakhstan	Gülendam Sarıbal; Turkey
90 kg	Gabriela Vasconcelos; Brazil	Felicia Eklund; Sweden	Raushan Janaliyeva; Kazakhstan
+90 kg	Barbora Bajciova; Slovakia	Antonina Lissyanskaya; Kazakhstan	Merve Yenidünya; Turkey

===== Right arm =====
Event	Gold	Silver	Bronze
50 kg	Sandugash Seidish; Kazakhstan	Anna Hranatova; Bulgaria	Chris Souza; Brazil
55 kg	Esra Kiraz; Turkey	Viktoriia Iliushyna; Ukraine	Zhanna Kaztuganova; Kazakhstan
60 kg	Esma Nur Çakmak; Turkey	Akmaral Sovetkhanova; Kazakhstan	Aigerim Karamanova; Kazakhstan
65 kg	Rebeka Martinkovicova; Slovakia	Brigitta Ivanfi; Hungary	Angela Matthews; United States
70 kg	Fia Reisek; Sweden	Olga Shlizhevskaya; Kazakhstan	ODeshi Dursayeva; Kazakhstan
80 kg	Anna Gronlund; Sweden	Gülendam Sarıbal; Turkey	Alena Stanskaya; Kazakhstan
90 kg	Gabriela Vasconcelos; Brazil	Raushan Janaliyeva; Kazakhstan	Felicia Eklund; Sweden
+90 kg	Barbora Bajciova; Slovakia	Rosa Baltodano Acosta; Puerto Rico	Antonina Lissyanskaya; Kazakhstan
