= Turkish Bodybuilding, Fitness and Armwrestling Federation =

Turkish sports governing body

- Abbreviation: TBFAF
- Formation: 1991; 35 years ago
- Type: Government organisation
- Headquarters: Ulus
- Location: Ankara, Turkey
- Region served: Turkey
- Official language: Turkish
- President: Koray Girgin
- Website: tvgfbf.gov.tr

Turkish Bodybuilding, Fitness and Armwrestling Federation (Turkish: Türkiye Vücut Geliştirme, Fitness ve Bilek Güreşi Federasyonu, shortly TVGFBF) is the governing body of bodybuilding, physical fitness and arm wrestling in Turkey. It was formed in 1991, and is based in Ankara. It is a member of the World Bodybuilding Federation, World Fitness Federation and World Armwrestling Federation . It organizes Turkish championships for each sport branch, and selects national teams for international competitions. President of the federation is Koray Girgin.

== History ==
=== Bodybuilding ===
Developed by Eugen Sandow (1867–1925), and took its current form in the early 1980s, the bodybuilding was pioneered in Turkey by Ahmet Enünlü (born 1948). The sport became popular in Turkey, and was included into the Turkish Weightlifting Federation. After many years, it has gradually turned into an individual area since 1982. In 1991, the Turkish Bodybuilding Federation was established.

=== Fitness ===
The fitness sport was incorporated into the Turkish Bodybuilding Federation in 1997. The federation was renamed to Turkish Bodybuilding and Fitness Federation.

=== Arm wrestling ===
Arm wrestling became first time known in Turkey in 1991, when Haydar Gidil won the gold medal in the 70 kg category at the World Armwrestling Championship held in Netanya, Israel. It was officially recognized in 1998, and the first Turkish Championship was held in Yalova that year. Arm wrestling became part of the federation four years later in 2001.
