= 2021 World Armwrestling Championship =

- Venue: Bucharest World Trade Center
- Location: Bucharest, Romania
- Dates: 24 November – 3 December

The 2021 World Armwrestling Championship was the 42nd edition of the World Armwrestling Championship held in Bucharest, Romania from 24 November to 3 December. The event was supposed to be held from 18 to 27 September 2020 in Batumi, Georgia. It was later postponed and then moved to another location. Georgian Armwrestling Federation was disqualified by the WAF Executive Board because of failing to organize the 2021 World Armwrestling Championship.

== Medal summary ==
=== Medal table ===
* Host nation (Romania)

Rank	Nation	Gold	Silver	Bronze	Total
1	Kazakhstan	9	7	5	21
2	Russian Armwrestling Federation	6	22	12	40
3	Bulgaria	5	3	4	12
4	Turkey	4	1	8	13
5	Slovakia	4	0	1	5
6	Ukraine	2	1	4	7
7	Brazil	2	0	1	3
8	Belarus	2	0	0	2
9	Moldova	1	1	0	2
10	Kyrgyzstan	1	0	0	1
10	Romania*	1	0	0	1
10	Sweden	1	0	0	1
13	Latvia	0	2	1	3
14	Croatia	0	1	0	1
15	Italy	0	0	1	1
15	United States	0	0	1	1
Totals (16 entries)		38	38	38	114

=== Medalists ===
==== Men ====
===== Left arm =====
Event	Gold	Silver	Bronze
55 kg	Yerdaulet Nurmakhan; Kazakhstan	Oraz Bassarov; Kazakhstan	Enes Talha Ay; Turkey
60 kg	Meirambek Yersaiyn; Kazakhstan	Şahman Süleymanoglu; Turkey	Roman Tserekaev; Russian Armwrestling Federation
65 kg	Yerdaulet Sarybay; Kazakhstan	Egor Farniev; Russian Armwrestling Federation	Riiaz Bagautdinov; Russian Armwrestling Federation
70 kg	Daniel Procopciuc; Moldova	Oleg Cherkasov; Russian Armwrestling Federation	Evren Serhat Arslan; Turkey
75 kg	Alan Zoloev; Russian Armwrestling Federation	Magzhan Shamiyev; Kazakhstan	Valentin Gospodinov; Bulgaria
80 kg	Oleh Zhokh; Ukraine	Aleksandr Anfilofev; Russian Armwrestling Federation	Vadim Akperov; Russian Armwrestling Federation
85 kg	Nedalin Hristov; Bulgaria	Viktor Shevelenko; Russian Armwrestling Federation	Eldar Bubenko; Russian Armwrestling Federation
90 kg	Artem Tainov; Russian Armwrestling Federation	Sasho Andreev; Bulgaria	Vladimir Matchenko; Kazakhstan
100 kg	Yordan Tsonev; Bulgaria	Stefan Lengarov; Bulgaria	Adam Barkinkhoev; Russian Armwrestling Federation
110 kg	Ivan Matyushenko; Russian Armwrestling Federation	Sandris Sedis; Latvia	Murat Efe Komek; Turkey
+110 kg	Georgi Tsvetkov; Bulgaria	Zaur Paizulaev; Russian Armwrestling Federation	Manuel Battaglia; Italy

===== Right arm =====
Event	Gold	Silver	Bronze
55 kg	Oraz Bassarov; Kazakhstan	Yerdaulet Nurmakhan; Kazakhstan	Mahmut Kendirci; Turkey
60 kg	Roman Tserekaev; Russian Armwrestling Federation	Iliyas Ormankulov; Kazakhstan	Dauren Absattar; Kazakhstan
65 kg	Yusuf Ziya Yildizoglu; Turkey	Egor Farniev; Russian Armwrestling Federation	Riiaz Bagautdinov; Russian Armwrestling Federation
70 kg	Oleg Cherkasov; Russian Armwrestling Federation	Daniel Procopciuc; Moldova	Ivan Gregoricka; Slovakia
75 kg	Alan Zoloev; Russian Armwrestling Federation	Artur Makarov; Russian Armwrestling Federation	Emrah Okcu; Turkey
80 kg	Bozhidar Simeonov; Bulgaria	Cvetan Gashevski; Bulgaria	Vadim Akperov; Russian Armwrestling Federation
85 kg	Viorel Dobrin; Romania	Georgii Tautiev; Russian Armwrestling Federation	Detelin Yonchev; Bulgaria
90 kg	Plamen Dimitrov; Bulgaria	Khadzhimurat Zoloev; Russian Armwrestling Federation	Vladimir Matchenko; Kazakhstan
100 kg	Petro Marharint; Ukraine	Rino Masic; Croatia	Timur Mamedov; Russian Armwrestling Federation
110 kg	Alexandr Getalo; Kazakhstan	Artem Grishin; Russian Armwrestling Federation	Sandris Sedis; Latvia
+110 kg	Serkan Yazanoğlu; Turkey	Dmitrii Pavin; Russian Armwrestling Federation	Petro Kychuk; Ukraine

==== Women ====
===== Left arm =====
Event	Gold	Silver	Bronze
50 kg	Yevgeniya Gunko; Kazakhstan	Anastasiia Goncharenko; Ukraine	Anna Hranatova; Ukraine
55 kg	Esra Kiraz; Turkey	Olga Terpelova; Russian Armwrestling Federation	Chris Souza; Brazil
60 kg	Lucia Debnarova; Slovakia	Aigerim Karamanova; Kazakhstan	Iana Kovaleva; Russian Armwrestling Federation
65 kg	Kristina Boldyreva; Kyrgyzstan	Santa Ansonska; Latvia	Rabia Kayahan; Turkey
70 kg	Olga Shlizhevskaya; Kazakhstan	Elizaveta Dzutseva; Russian Armwrestling Federation	Angela Matthews; United States
80 kg	Gabriela Vasconcelos; Brazil	Elena Vdovichenko; Russian Armwrestling Federation	Anastasia Bryuntseva; Russian Armwrestling Federation
90 kg	Tatsiana Kaliuk; Belarus	Iana Baranovskaya; Russian Armwrestling Federation	Teodora Krasteva; Bulgaria
+90 kg	Barbora Bajciova; Slovakia	Madina Kairova; Russian Armwrestling Federation	Antonina Lissyanskaya; Kazakhstan

===== Right arm =====
Event	Gold	Silver	Bronze
50 kg	Yevgeniya Gunko; Kazakhstan	Diana Bareeva; Russian Armwrestling Federation	Anna Hranatova; Ukraine
55 kg	Esra Kiraz; Turkey	Olga Terpelova; Russian Armwrestling Federation	Şükriye Yılmaz; Turkey
60 kg	Aigerim Karamanova; Kazakhstan	Adelia Fazdalova; Russian Armwrestling Federation	Iana Kovaleva; Russian Armwrestling Federation
65 kg	Rebeka Martinkovicova; Slovakia	Irina Gladkaia; Russian Armwrestling Federation	Rabia Kayahan; Turkey
70 kg	Fia Reisek; Sweden	Olga Shlizhevskaya; Kazakhstan	Viktoria Voronina; Russian Armwrestling Federation
80 kg	Gabriela Vasconcelos; Brazil	Elena Vdovichenko; Russian Armwrestling Federation	Ruslana Kulyk; Ukraine
90 kg	Tatsiana Kaliuk; Belarus	Alena Stanskaya; Kazakhstan	Daniela Karakasheva; Bulgaria
+90 kg	Barbora Bajciova; Slovakia	Madina Kairova; Russian Armwrestling Federation	Antonina Lissyanskaya; Kazakhstan
