= Iran Armwrestling Association =

Sports organization

- انجمن مچ‌ اندازی ایران
- Type: Sports organization
- Headquarters: Iran
- President: Mehdi Abdolvand

The Iran Armwrestling Association (Persian: انجمن مچ‌ اندازی ایران) is associated with the organization and development of arm wrestling in Iran. Iranian news reports have documented the activities of the country's arm wrestling committee and Iranian athletes' participation in international competitions.

== History ==
Arm wrestling developed in Iran through domestic competitions and participation in international events. A report published by Tasnim News Agency in April 2019 discussed the development of the sport and the activities of its committee in Iran.

In August 2021, Tasnim reported that Iran had been selected to host the 2022 Asian Armwrestling Championships. The report identified Ezzat Rajablu as the head of Iran's arm wrestling committee at that time.

== Leadership ==
The following individuals have been associated with the leadership of organized arm wrestling in Iran:

- Mehdi Abdolvand — President of the Iran Armwrestling Association.
- Ezzat Rajablu — Former head of Iran's arm wrestling committee. In August 2021, Tasnim News Agency identified Rajablu as the head of the committee in a report about Iran's selection to host the 2022 Asian Armwrestling Championships.

A channel associated with the Tehran Province Armwrestling Committee has also published information about regional arm wrestling activities and officials.

== International competitions ==
Iranian athletes have competed in the Asian Armwrestling Championships. At the 2021 championships in Almaty, Kazakhstan, Iranian competitors won 31 medals across age categories, including four gold, seven silver and 20 bronze medals, according to Iran Press.

Iranian women also won medals at the 2021 Asian Armwrestling Championships, as reported by Iran Press.

The World Armwrestling Federation published information about the 2021 Asian Armwrestling and Para-Armwrestling Championships on its website.

== See also ==
- Arm wrestling
- World Armwrestling Federation
- Bodybuilding in Iran
