= Sport in Iran =

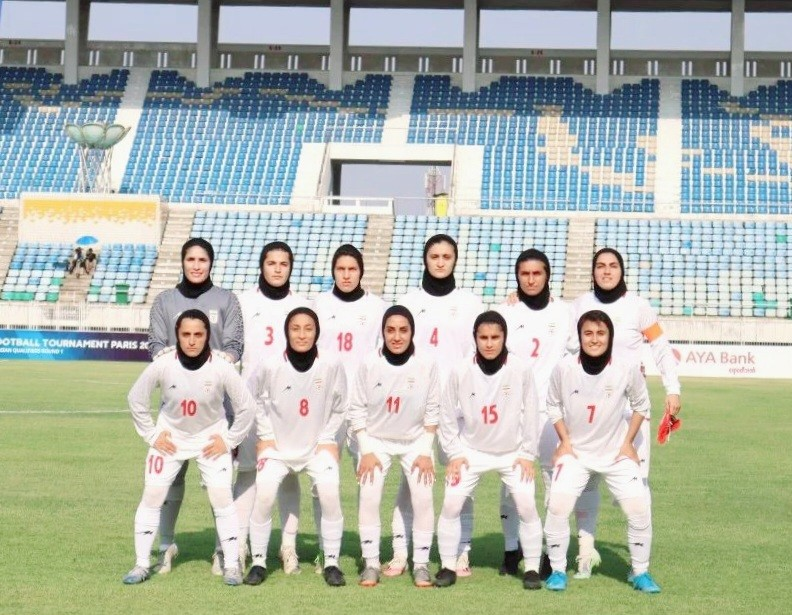
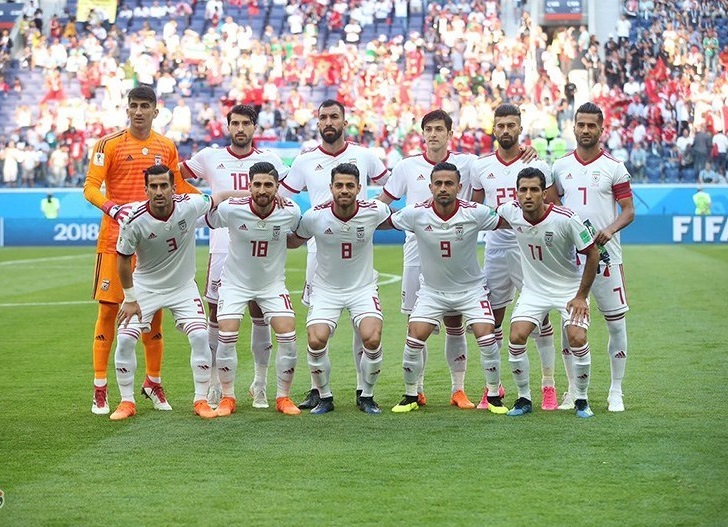
Football is the most popular sport in Iran.

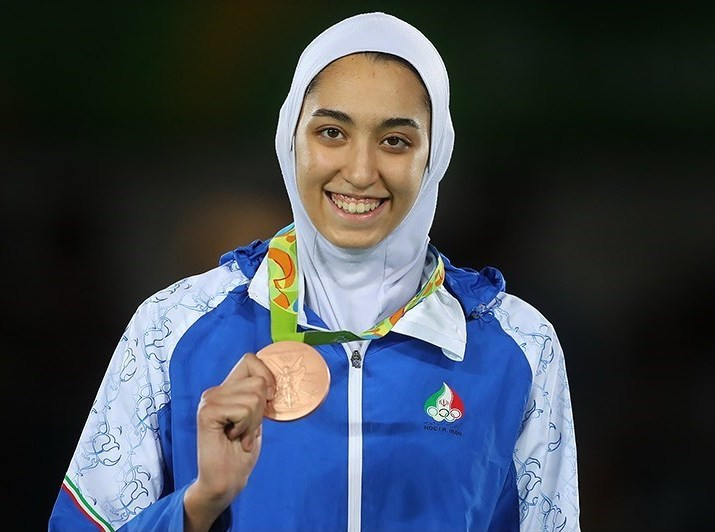
Iranian champion Kimia Alizadeh

Many sports in Iran are both traditional and modern. Tehran, for example, was the first city in West Asia to host the Asian Games in 1974, and continues to host and participate in major international sporting events. Freestyle wrestling has been traditionally regarded as Iran's national sport, however today, football is the most popular sport in Iran. Because of economic sanctions, the annual government's budget for sport was about $80 million in 2010 or about $1 per person. Football and volleyball are among the two most popular sports in Iran.

== History ==
Sports and athletic exercises were among the most fundamental daily pursuits of the people in ancient Iran.

According to their religious teaching, the Iranian Zoroastrians in their prayers sought first the beauties of heaven and then physical strength and mental power.

The ancient Iranians attached spiritual meaning to their spoils activities which they modeled on their weapons. Even the Mages (religious sages) while engaging in prayers in their temples held a mace in their hands, not unlike the British bishops who hung swords on their belts.

In Ancient Iran, youths under 24 years of age received thorough training in the sport of their time which included miming, horsemanship, polo, dart throwing, wrestling, boxing, archery, and fencing. They were taught under conditions of severe hardship so that when the need arose they could endure the adverse conditions of war such as hunger, thirst, fatigue, heat, cold, etc.

As of 2015, only 20 percent of Iranians are physically active while the world average is 60 percent. 30% of Iranian youths never play any sports.

Iran achieved a victory in the London 2012 Olympics. The Iranian Team has won 13 medals including 7 Gold Medals.

=== Sportswomen ===
Since 1979, women athletes have been subject to strict requirements when competing in Iran or abroad, with the Iranian Olympic Committee stating that "severe punishment will be meted out to those who do not follow Islamic rules during sporting competitions". The committee banned women athletes from competing in Olympic events where a male referee could come into physical contact with them. At the 1996, 2000, 2004 and 2008 Summer Olympics combined, a total of six women represented Iran.

In 2016, Iran made global headlines for the international female community after Iran got its first gold medal achieved by a woman.

In 1979, there were only 1,000 female athletes in Iran, and now the number of female athletes has reached more than 1.4 million.

Prominent female athletes such as Zahra Nemati, Hamideh Abbasali, Nazanin Malai, Farzaneh Fassihi, Leila Rajabi, Elahe Ahmadi, Nahid Kiani, Sarasadat Khademalsharieh, Kimia Alizadeh are well known among the Iranian people.

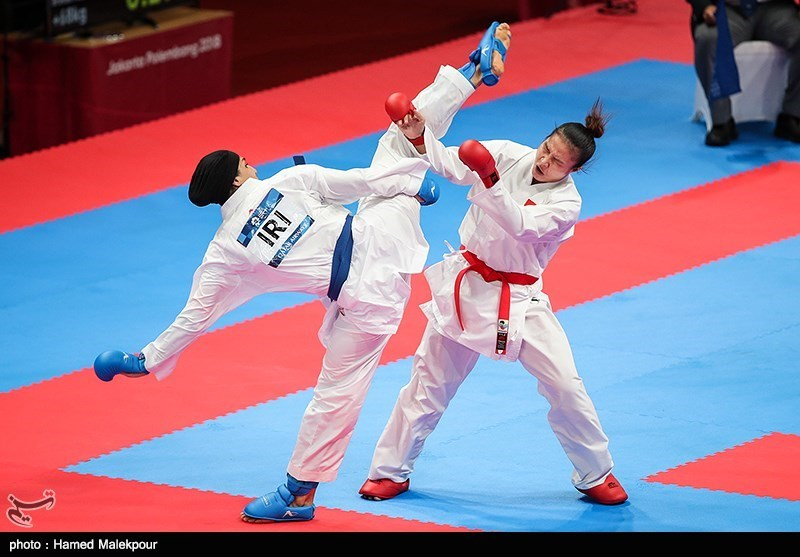
Hamideh Abbasali (Left)

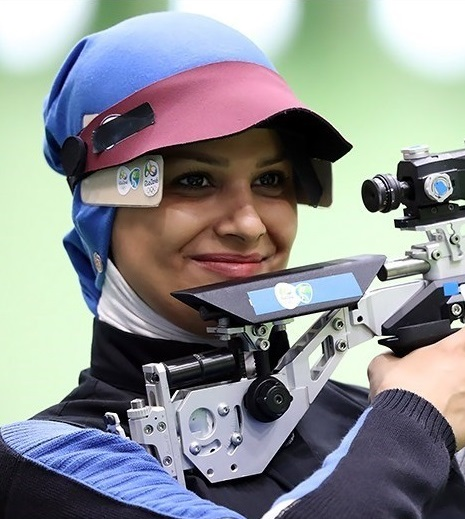
Elaheh Ahmadi

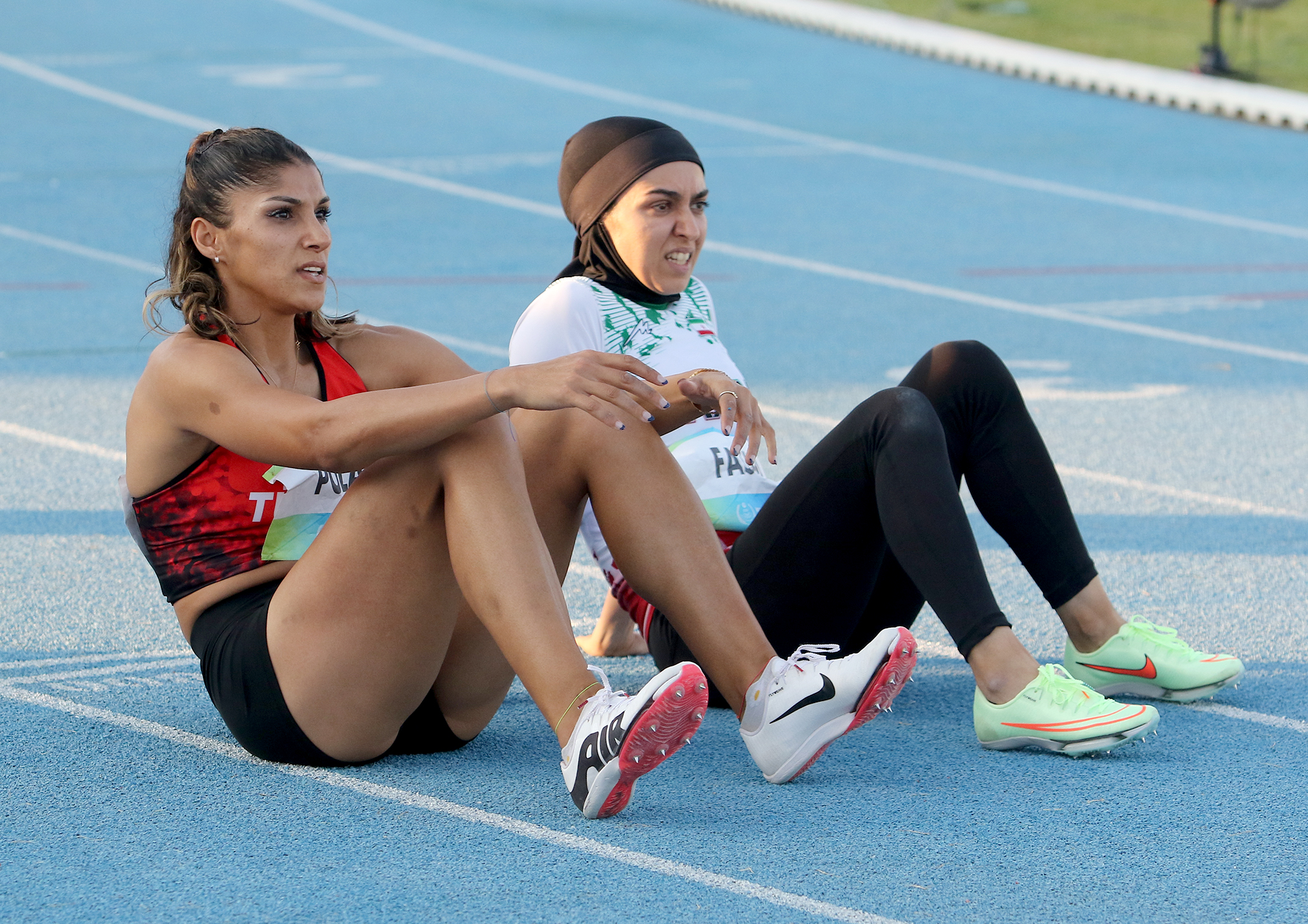
Farzaneh Fasihi (Right)

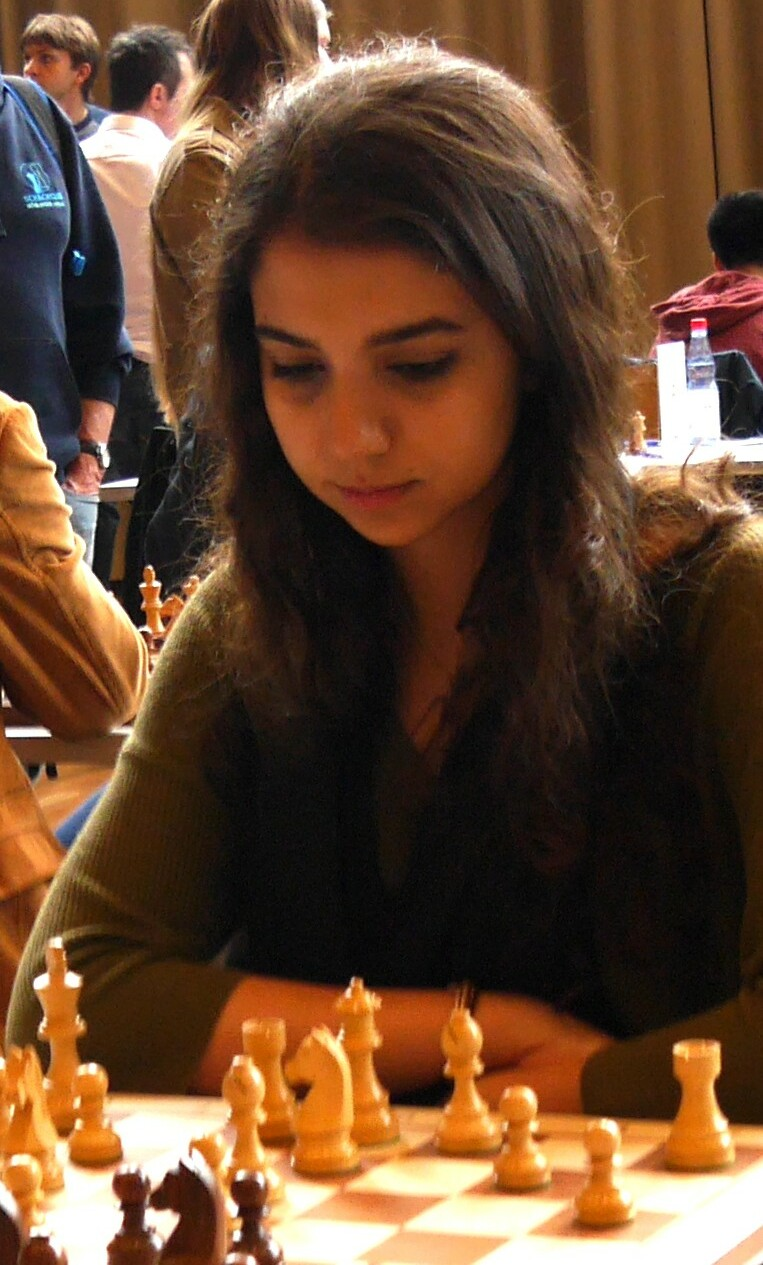
Sarasadat Khademalsharieh

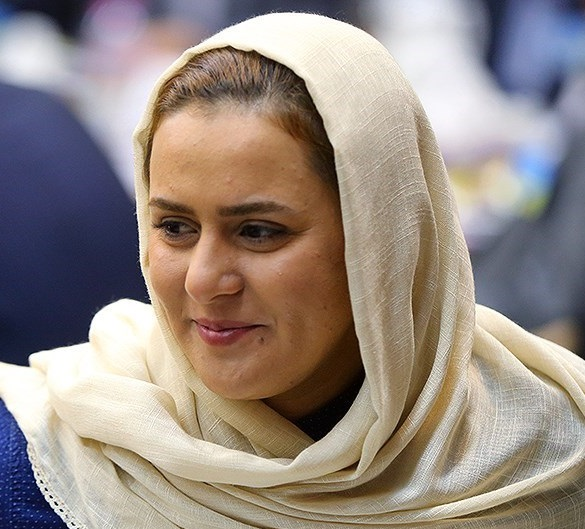
Zahra Nemati

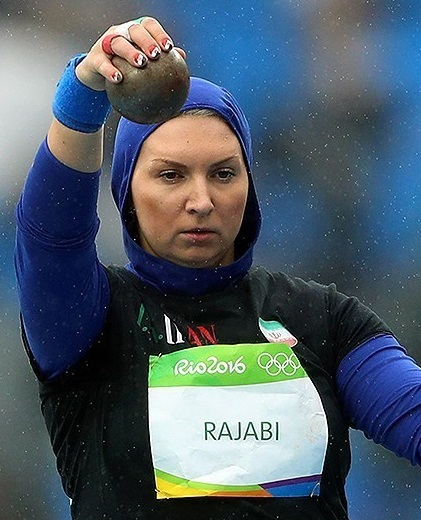
Leila Rajabi

== Iran sport organization ==
- 1935: National Sports Association
- 1960: Integration into the Education Ministry
- 1971: Sports and Recreation Organization
- 1977: Dissolution and fusion with the Education Ministry (for the 2nd time)
- 1979–present: Independent Physical Education Organization (part of the Government)
- 2011: Proposal in Parliament to merge the National Youth Organization with the Physical Education Organization.

=== Sports categories ===
- Championship sports: see also: National Olympic Committee of the Islamic Republic of Iran
- Sports education: see also: Education in Iran
- Public sport: see also: Health in Iran

== Budget ==
According to a report in 2017, Iran's sports budget was very small this year and several decades before.

== Traditional sports ==
=== Bodybuilding and fitness ===
Bodybuilding is very popular among the younger generation. Some professional bodybuilders of Iranian descent include Baitollah Abbaspour, Javad Nabavi, Mohamad Farokh, Ali Tabrizi, Hamid Manafi and Zohair Al Karbelaie ("Arnold" of Fallah!).

Iran's championship bodybuilding competitions are also held in the country. Since the late 2000s, the increasing desire of Iranian women to participate in fitness and bodybuilding events has been reported. However, restrictions have been imposed on them by the government.

=== Wrestling ===
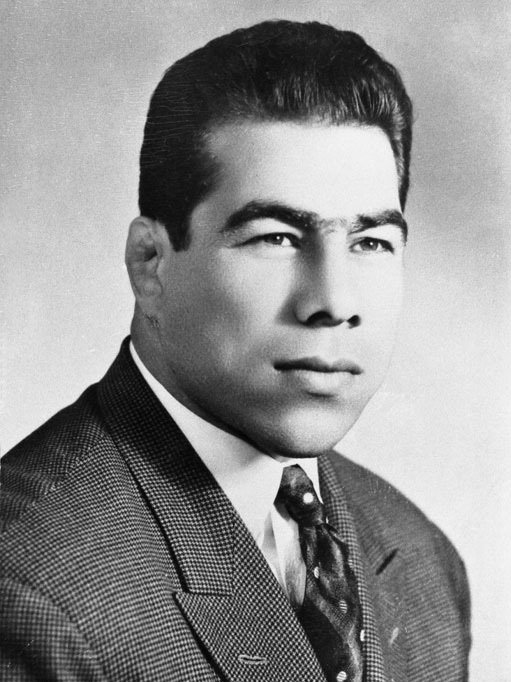
Gholamreza Takhti, Iranian Olympic Gold-Medalist wrestler and Varzesh-e Bastani practitioner

Wrestling has a long tradition and history in Iran. There are many styles of folk wrestling, from Varzesh-e Pahlavani to Zurkhaneh which have similarities with modern freestyle wrestling.

Both freestyle and Greco-Roman wrestling, particularly freestyle, are popular in Iran. Mazandaran is the main power in the country and wrestling is part of its culture. Tehran, Kermanshah, Khorasan and Hamedan also produce wrestlers.

Iran has a history of notable wrestlers, such as Gholamreza Takhti (two-time champion at freestyle wrestling World Championships: 1959 and 1961.

=== Polo ===
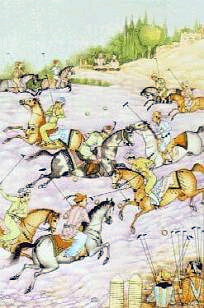
A Polo scene in Old Persia, depicted by Hossein Behzad

The poet Firdowsi described royal polo tournaments in his 9th century epic, the Shahnameh. Polo competitions are the subject of traditional paintings in Iran.

Despite the emphasis in Islam on learning the equestrian arts, in modern times, especially after the 1979 Iranian revolution, the equestrian sports fell out of favor in Iran, as they were associated with the aristocracy. However, recent signs suggest that it may be witnessing a comeback, with renewed interest in the sport.

Horse racing is a popular sport between Turkmens of Iran, and there are two Gymnasium of horse racing at Gonbad Kavous and Bandar Torkaman. Competitions are not international and not broadcast. Lottery only for horse racing (and archery) is not prohibited in Islam.

== Board games ==
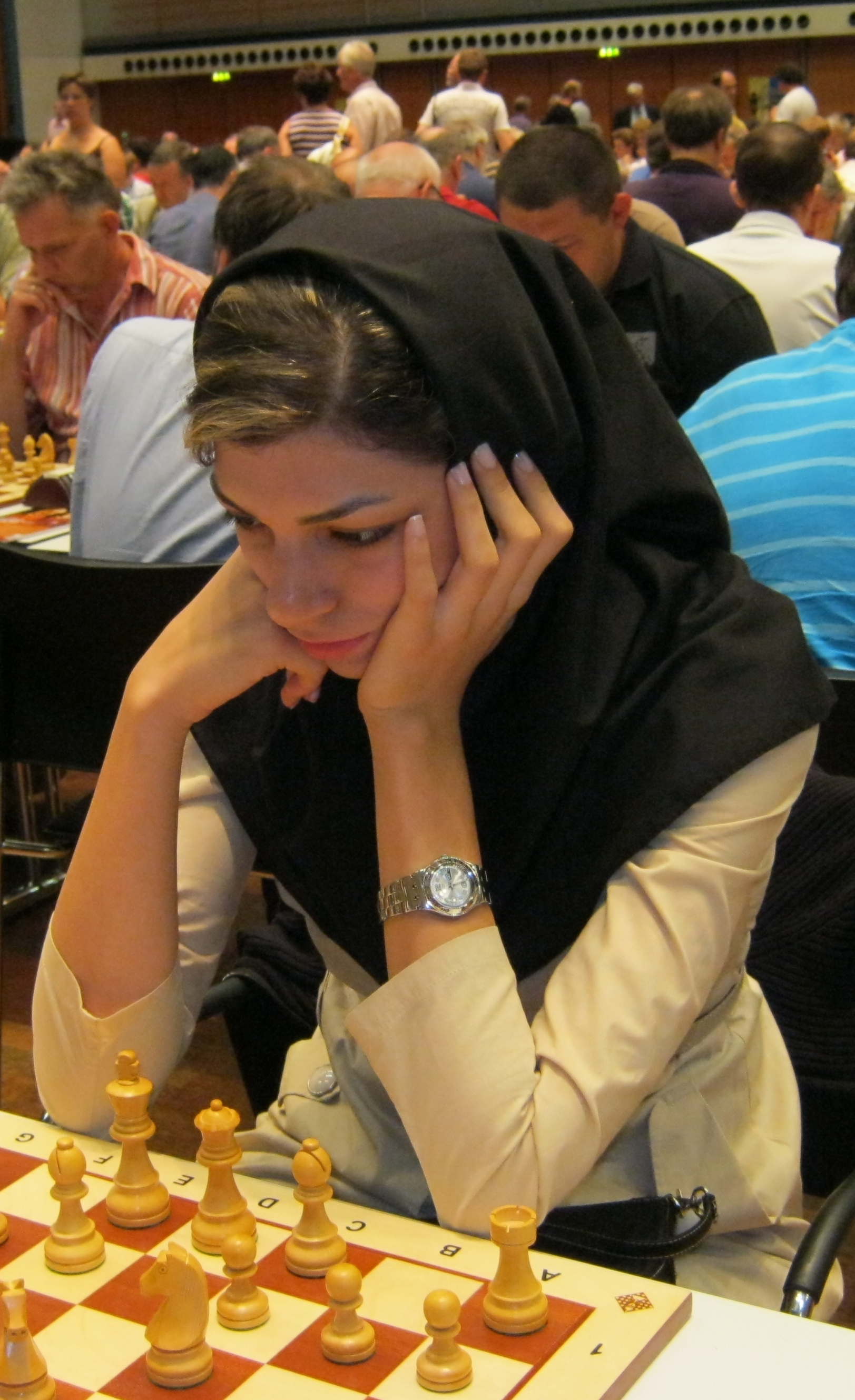
Atousa Pourkashiyan, Iranian chess Woman Grandmaster.

=== Chess ===
The origin of chess is a disputed issue, but evidence exists to give credence to the theory that chess originated in India and later it came to Iran.

== Sports ==
=== Association football ===
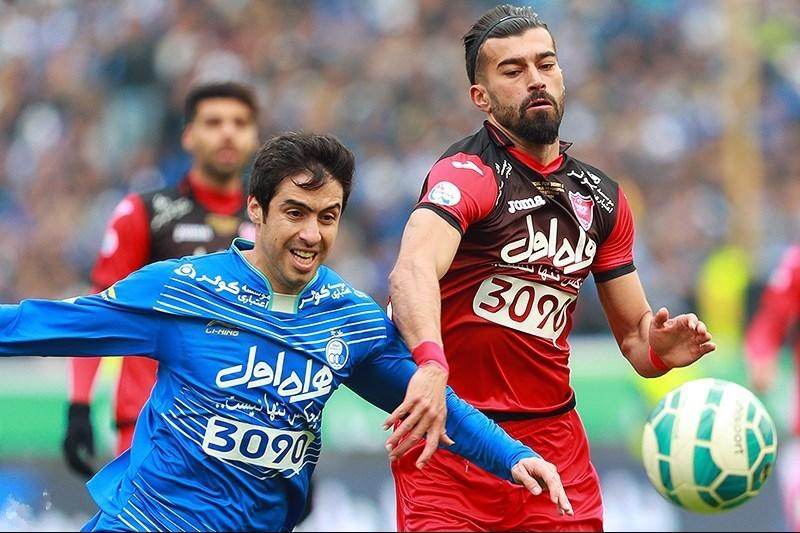
Tehran Derby, a football match between Esteghlal and Persepolis. This match was declared as the most important derby in Asia and 22nd most important derby in the world in June 2008 by World Soccer magazine.

Football is a sport in Iran. Iran has been able to qualify for the FIFA World Cup seven times (1978, 1998, 2006, 2014, 2018, 2022 & 2026), won the AFC Asian Cup three times (1968, 1972 & 1976), and four times has won gold medal at the Asian Games (1974, 1990, 1998 & 2002).

Some Iranian players now play in European leagues, and some Iranian clubs have hired European players or coaches.

Iranian clubs (Esteghlal and Pas) have three times won the Asian Club Championship (1970, 1991, 1993); but the last championship of an Iranian team at AFC Champions League dated back to the 1992–1993 season.

Like all other sports, adequate football facilities are limited in Iran. Iran's largest football stadium is the Azadi Stadium, with a seating capacity of 100,000. Home Stadium of Esteghlal and Persepolis (Most Popular Iranian Clubs) and where that national matches are held.

=== Volleyball ===
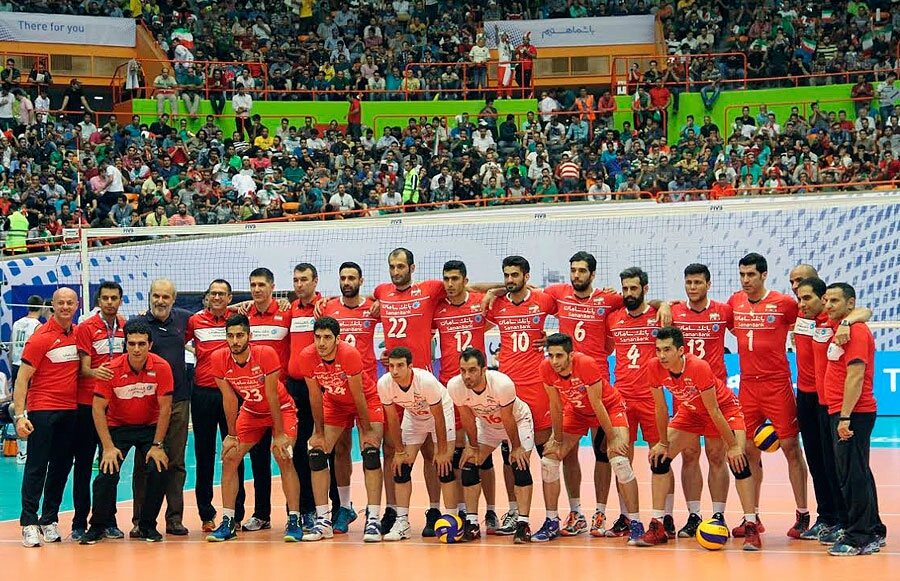
Iran men's national volleyball team

In volleyball, Iran has a national team, and a professional league. In the 2007 Men's U21 Volleyball World Championship, the Iranians were successful at earning a bronze medal. Also, in late August 2007, the Iran national under-19 volleyball team won the gold medal in the Volleyball World Championship in Mexico, marking the first such international gold medal for an Iranian team sport.

Iran featured a men's national team in beach volleyball that competed at the 2018–2020 AVC Beach Volleyball Continental Cup.

=== Basketball ===
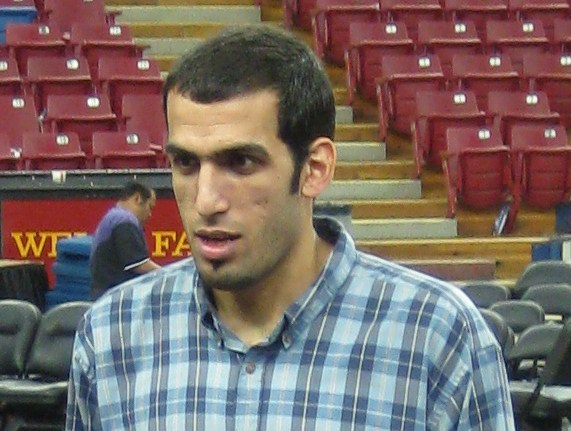
Hamed Haddadi, Iran's most prominent basketball player.

In basketball, Iran has an national team, and a professional league, with players in Asia. The national team participated in the 1948 Summer Olympics in London, finishing 1–3. They competed in the 2008 Summer Olympics in Beijing, thanks to their gold medal in the 2007 FIBA Asia Championship, their first ever continental crown. The first ever Iranian NBA-player is Hamed Haddadi.

Iran have made strides to develop their women's national team program.

=== Weightlifting ===
Strength sports like weightlifting, powerlifting and bodybuilding have held favor among Iranians and seen the success of world record-holding super-heavyweight lifter Hossein Reza Zadeh, or Sydney Olympics gold medalist, Hossein Tavakoli.

=== Kabaddi ===
Kabaddi is also popular mainly in a select few regions like Gorgan, and Shehr e Sukhteh, Isfahan besides the capital Tehran. The Iran national kabaddi team represents Iran on the International stage in Kabaddi. Iran became Champions of Asian Games in 2018, and have been two times runner-ups (2010, 2014). They have also been Standard style World cup runner-ups (in 2004, 2007, 2016)

Among other tournaments they have won the Kabaddi medal events at Asian beach Games in 2012 and 2014.Iran has also served as hosts for the Circle style Asia Cup in 2011.

=== Skiing ===
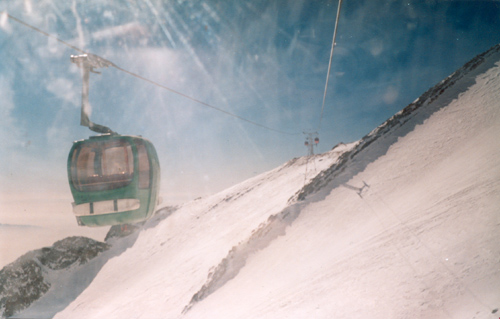
Gondola lift carry skiers and other visitors to Tochal mountain near Tehran.

Iran is home to mountainous regions, some of which are suitable for skiing, and snowboarding.

Skiing began in Iran in 1938 through the efforts of two German railway engineers. Today, 13 ski resorts operate in Iran, including Tochal, Dizin, and Shemshak. Potentially suitable terrain can also be found in Lorestan, Mazandaran, and other provinces. The Tochal resort was completed in 1976 shortly before the overthrow of the Shah.

=== Hiking and climbing sports ===
Due to its mountains, climbing sports are popular in Iran. Both the Zagros and Alborz ranges provide opportunities for the novice and advanced alike. Hiking and trekking enthusiasts find opportunities in locations like Alamut and Tangeh Savashi.

=== Martial arts ===
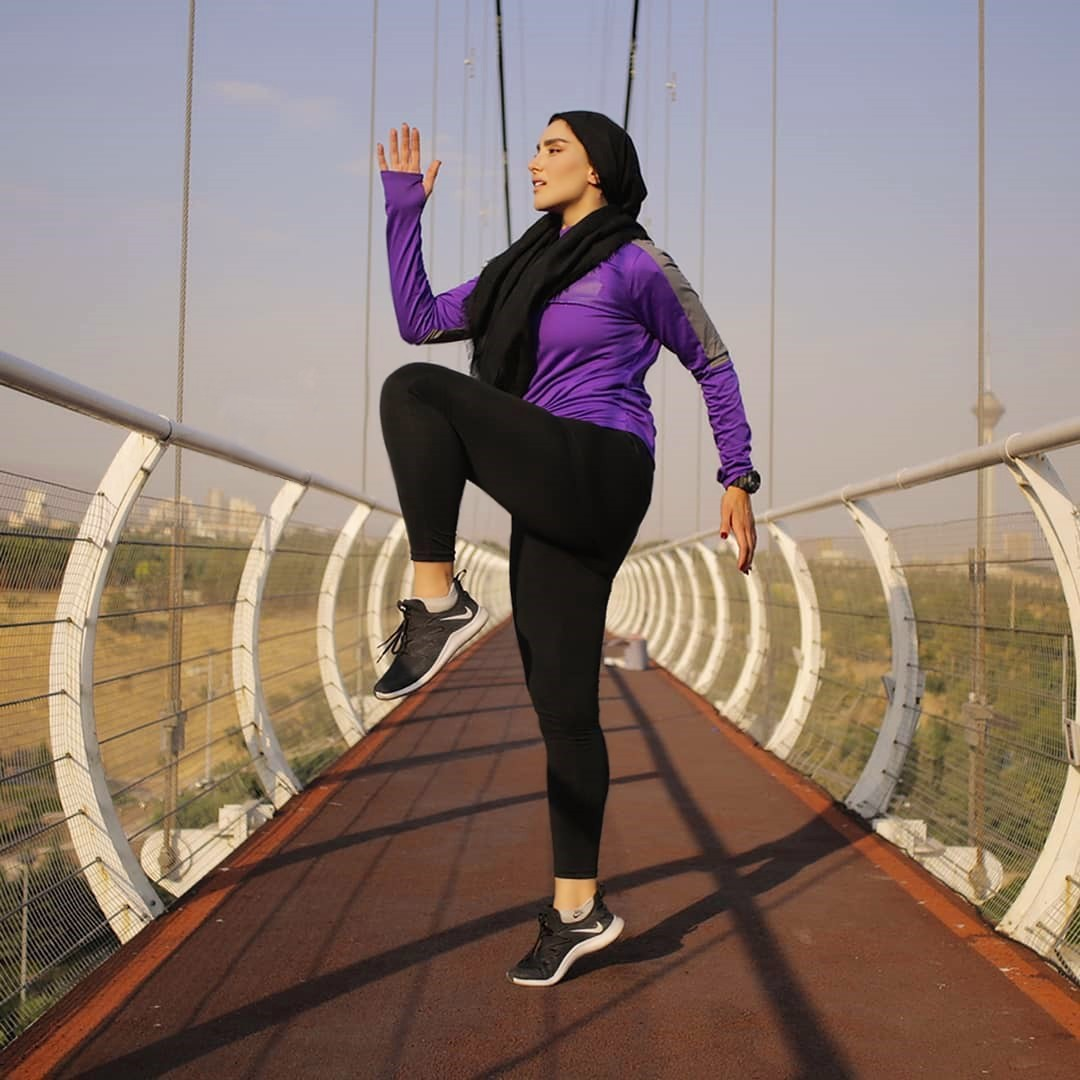
Shahrbanu Damghaninezhad, Iranian martial arts athlete

Kyokushin, shotokan, wushu, judo, and taekwondo are the most popular. martial arts

Iran competed in the International Judo Federation (IJF) until 2019, when it was barred after 2018 world champion Iranian judoka Saeid Mollaei said he was ordered to throw a match to avoid facing an Israeli judoka. The incident resulted in Mollaei's flight to Germany, after Iran persecuted him and his family in retaliation for the international humiliation.

In 2016, Iran was at the top of the medal count of the World Kickboxing Federation World Championship with seven gold medals and one bronze. In the 4th World Kun Khmer Championship, Iran took second place with two gold medals, one silver and one bronze.

=== Futsal ===
Futsal is practiced both at the amateur and professional levels. As of January 2019, Iran's men's national futsal team ranked 6th in world rankings.

Iran has won the AFC Futsal Championship nine times out of ten and reached the FIFA Futsal World Cup finals five times. Iran also has a nationwide Futsal Super League.

=== Tennis ===
The tennis entertainer Mansour Bahrami is Iranian, as well as his tennis partner Ramin Raziyani.

== Other sports ==
Another sport in Iran is rallying. Female drivers have been allowed to participate in national rally tournaments, including Iran's female driver Laleh Seddigh.

== Attendance at sporting events ==
Since the 1979 Iranian revolution, though never explicitly declared in the law, women were barred from attending men's football, swimming and wrestling competitions. In April 2006, President Mahmoud Ahmadinejad speculated about allowing women back into the stadiums. It is uncertain if this measure would gain approval, since many hard-line clerics have voiced their opposition.

== See also ==
- National Iranian Olympic Academy
- Cycling Federation of the Islamic Republic of Iran
- Tourism in Iran
- Health care in Iran
