= Health in Iran =

As for many developing countries, health issues in Iran stem from a variety of reasons: namely, water and sanitation, diet and fitness, various addictions, mental fitness, communicable diseases, hygiene and the environment.

The Human Rights Measurement Initiative finds that Iran is fulfilling 88.6% of what it should be fulfilling for the right to health based on its level of income. When looking at the right to health with respect to children, Iran achieves 96.5% of what is expected based on its current income. In regard to the right to health amongst the adult population, the country achieves 98.8% of what is expected based on the nation's level of income. Iran falls into the "very bad" category when evaluating the right to reproductive health because the nation is fulfilling only 70.6% of what the nation is expected to achieve based on the resources (income) it has available.

== Water and sanitation ==
Iran has one of the highest percentages of population in the Middle East with access to safe drinking water, with an estimate of 92% of its people enjoying such access (nearly 100% in urban areas and about 80% in rural areas as of 2007).

There is a considerable shortfall in sewage treatment; for example, in Tehran the majority of the population has no wastewater treatment, with raw sewage being injected directly into the groundwater. As the water crisis deepens with an expanding population, this pollution of groundwater causes increasing health risks.

== Nutrition and fitness ==
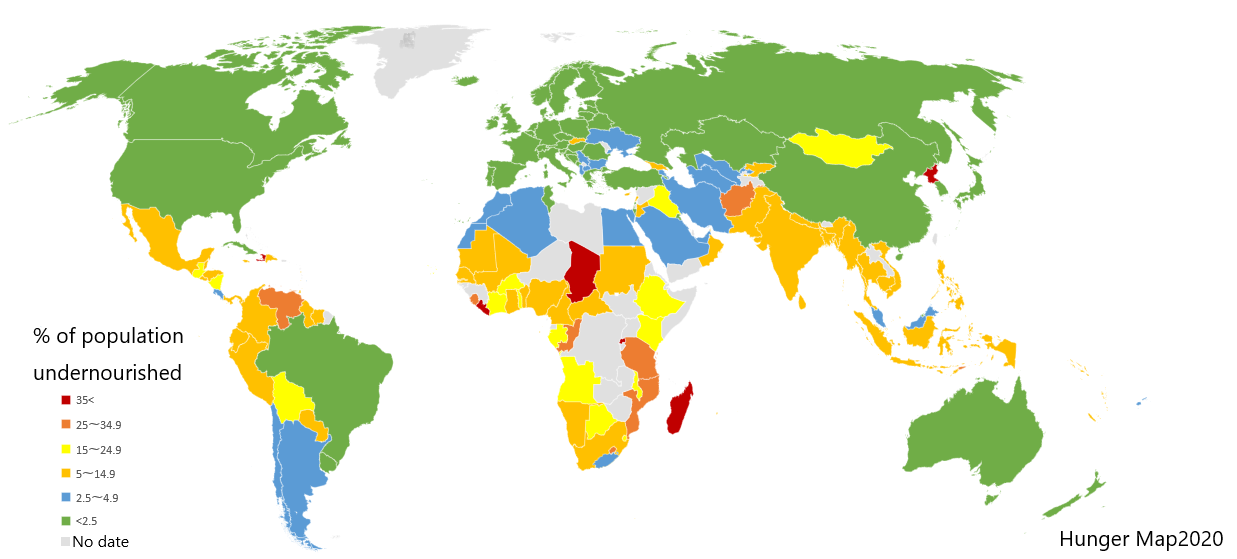
Percentage of national population suffering from malnutrition, according to United Nations statistics

=== Nutrition ===
Forty-five million Iranians face inadequate nutrition according to Iranian officials. Kohgiloyeh and Boyerahmad, Sistan-Baluchistan, Hormozgan, Kerman and Khuzestan as provinces that face malnutrition or food insecurity.

=== Diet, food ingredients and junk food ===
The soft drinks industry is valued at about $2 billion a year. As of 2008, Iran produces about 3 billion litres of different types of soft drinks to address consumption of 46 litres per capita, and they export more than 12% of its production. Increased awareness with regard to the damages of carbonated drinks and sugar, and high levels of diabetes has created a move towards healthier products.

=== Food safety and packaging ===
The Codex Commission of Food Stuff, established in 2002 is in charge of setting and developing standards and quality and health regulations, related to the production of and trade in raw agricultural products and food stuffs, in accordance with the different global standards. Tainted meat has been imported according to Iranian authorities. Uncontrolled use of pesticides is also a problem.

=== Obesity ===
In 1988, Iran was one of the top seven countries with the highest rate of childhood obesity. In 2005, 33.7% of adults were at risk of developing metabolic syndrome. Eight million Iranians already live with this syndrome. In 1995, 24.7% of boys and 26.8% of girls age 6 were overweight.

One of the major reasons for increased obesity is urbanization. In 2005, an average Iranian citizen consumed 42 liters of soda per year, as well as 40% more carbohydrates, 30% more fat, and 40% more food than the body needs. The greater availability of fast food and junk food in combination with a low activity lifestyle has contributed to the obesity trend. Other factors include the impact of technology and a high consumption of rice and bread. Many families with a moderate income are limited in the foods they are able to afford, resulting in a higher incidence of obese children. However, childhood obesity is not a concern because it is believed that these children will outgrow their fatness as they age. The health impact of childhood obesity is unknown. The tendency of obesity is increasing among children. The outbreak of obesity is increasing amid both girls and boys in civic area but sometimes it shows decrease in boys and girls in rustic area. Overweight should be observed as a preference and to be considered in relation with expansion of the different areas and districts.

=== Physical fitness ===
As an additional measure of public health and inefficient food distribution, about thirteen percent of the young people are classified as obese, according to the United Nations FAO sources. According to the government of Iran, about 60 percent of Iranians are overweight and 35 percent of women and 15 percent of men have obesity in Iran. Despite the young age of many Iranians, only 20 percent of Iranians are physically active while the world average is 60 percent. 30% of Iranian youths never play any sports.

== Communicable diseases & addictions ==
Immunization of children is accessible to most of the urban and rural population.

=== Cholera ===
Cholera has been a persistent problem in Iran. In the 2005 epidemic which involved loss of lives, state television warned people not to eat vegetables or buy ice blocks on the streets. Salads were also banned in some restaurants. The 1998 epidemic involved considerably more cases and loss of life.

=== HIV/AIDS ===
Increased drug use has driven up the incidence of human immunodeficiency virus (HIV). In 2005 two-thirds of the official total of 9,800 HIV cases were attributed to drug use. Iran has established a national HIV treatment system, including 150 testing sites and a free needle exchange program.

According to the United Nations, AIDS has been increasing in Iran at a rapid rate. The major factor fuelling the epidemic until now has been injecting drug use, while there is an increase in sexual transmission of the disease. An estimated 14% of people who inject drugs countrywide were living with HIV in 2007. In 2009, men account for 93 percent of the HIV patients, and women comprise 7 percent of the infected population.

The rate of the epidemic in Iran is however still very low compared to international standards. Iran has a low prevalence of HIV infections with a rate of about 0.16 percent of the adult population (18,000 cases, officially) compared with 0.8 percent in North America (2008). But according to the WHO, as of the end of 2009, there are more than 100,000 AIDS sufferers in Iran (approximately 0.135% of the Iranian population).

=== Illegal drugs ===
Drug addiction constitutes a major health problem. Iran is situated along one of the main trafficking routes for cannabis, heroin, opium and morphine produced in Afghanistan, and designer drugs have also found their way into the local market in recent years. Iran ranks first worldwide in the prevalence of opiate addiction with 2.8% of its population addicted. Initiation age for most Iranian addicts is their 20s. Hundreds of drug production laboratories have been set up in Pakistan and Afghanistan. Iran's police said in April 2009 that 7,700 tonnes of opium was produced in Afghanistan in 2008, of which 3000 tonnes entered Iran, adding that the force had managed to seize 1000 tonnes of the smuggled opium. Iran spent over 600 million dollars in just the last two years to dig canals, build barriers and install barbed wire to seal off the country's crime-infested borders.

Iran discovers 3 tons of drugs daily. In 2005, estimates of the number of drug addicts ranged from 2 to 4 million (1.2 million according to the Government). Reasons for addiction include lack of economic prospects among the youth and lack of freedom. In a 2014 survey, 30.6% of the youth considered financial issues as their biggest concern, while 28.9% chose unemployment, 10.8% university acceptance, and 7.5% marriage issues as their biggest worries.

=== Smoking ===
Iran has implemented a strict smoking ban in all public places. By 2007, smoking decreased to 11%. However, the rate of smokers in the general population increased again significantly in recent years. As of 2018, this rate stands at 14%. According to the new law, smoking is prohibited in all public organizations, hotels, restaurants, tea houses and coffee shops. Also forbidden is the offering and smoking of ghalyun, the traditional Persian waterpipe, which is a must in Iranian tea houses. A smoking ban for all car drivers nationwide was implemented since March 2006, and although offenders could face fines, the ban was widely ignored by the drivers. Also selling tobacco products to anyone under 18 would result in confiscation of the vendor's tobacco products and a cash fine. Repeated violations would lead to high cash fines.

About 20% of adult male and 4.5% of adult female population in the country smoke tobacco (12 million smokers according to some estimates). 60,000 Iranians die directly or indirectly due to smoking every year (2008). Smoking is responsible for 25% of death in the country. Approx. 54bn-60bn cigarettes are believed to be consumed annually in Iran. Around 2.7bn cigarettes are smuggled into Iran annually, according to officials from the state-owned Iranian Tobacco Company (ITC), on top of another 26.7bn which are imported legally (2008). Imports of cigarettes, tobacco, cigars, cigarette paper, cigarette tips are subject to government monopoly. Iranians spend more than $1.8 billion a year on tobacco. According to a 2010 law, smokers henceforth will not be appointed to senior government jobs.

=== Air pollution ===
Some sources say Iran's air pollution is some of the worst in the world. The prevalence of respiratory diseases and cancers in Iran is increasing at a significant rate, also because of air pollution in Tehran. It is estimated that 5 million Iranian children have asthma. The World Bank estimates losses inflicted on Iran's economy as a result of deaths caused by air pollution at $640 million, which is equal to 5.1 trillion rials or 0.57 percent of GDP. Substandard gasoline and imported car brakes are also a reported health hazard/air pollutant according to the authorities.

=== Alcohol consumption ===
Prohibited in Iran because of the Islamic law, except for non-Muslims who can legally consume alcoholic beverages in private. Alcohol smuggling into Iran was estimated at nearly $1 billion in 2010. More than 200,000 people in Iran are estimated to be involved in bootlegging. Many rely on what's made in people's basements or gardens in unsanitary conditions.

=== COVID-19 ===
Iran has been among the worst affected countries by the COVID-19 2019-pandemic claiming thousands of lives in the country (2020).

== Family planning ==
The Islamic Republic of Iran has a comprehensive and effective program of family planning. While Iran's population grew at a rate of more than 3% per year between 1956 and 1986, the growth rate began to decline in the late 1980s and early 1990s after the government initiated a major population control program. By 2007 the growth rate had declined to 0.7 percent per year, with a birth rate of 17 per 1,000 persons and a death rate of 6 per 1,000. Reports by the UN show birth control policies in Iran to be effective with the country topping the list of greatest fertility decreases. UN's Population Division of the Department of Economic and Social Affairs says that between 1975 and 1980, the total fertility number was 6.5. The projected level for Iran's 2005 to 2010 birth rate is fewer than two. As at 2012, more than half of Iran's population is under 35 years old. Authorities are now slashing its birth-control programs in an attempt to avoid an aging demographic similar to many Western countries that are struggling to keep up with state medical and social security costs. One fifth of all couples are infertile.

== Leading causes of mortality ==
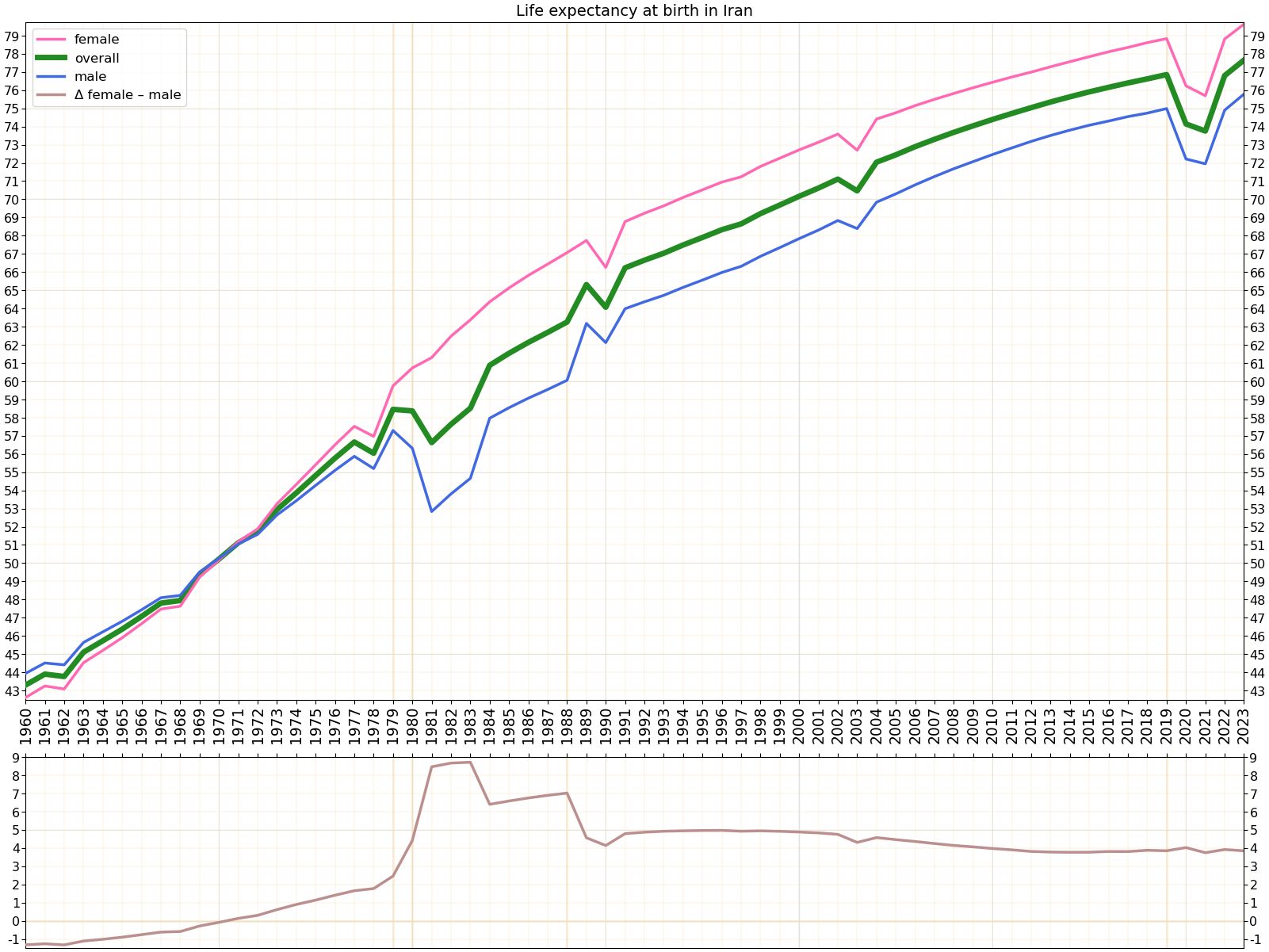
Historical development of life expectancy in Iran, discriminated by biological sex. (1960-2021)

Healthcare in Iran (Source: EIU)	2005	2006	2007	2008 est.	2009 est.	2010 est.
Life expectancy, average (years)	70.0	70.3	70.6	70.9	71.1	71.4
Healthcare spending (% of GDP)	4.2	4.2	4.2	4.2	4.2	4.2
Healthcare spending ($ per head)	113	132	150	191	223	261

In the early 2000s the main natural causes of death have been cardiovascular disease and cancer. Cancer Research Center of Iran says 41,000 Iranians die of cancer each year. According to Iran's Health Ministry, the most fatal cancer for men across the country is stomach cancer and for women is breast cancer with 90,000 new cancer cases reported each year (2015).

According to Ministry of Health and Medical Education, in 2003, 41% of total deaths were due to diseases of the circulatory system. Myocardial infarction as the cause of 25% of deaths was the leading cause of mortality among the population.

Addiction is the fourth major cause of death in Iran following road accidents, heart disease and depression.

From 2001 to 2010, over 438,000 Iranians have died from "unnatural deaths" such as electric shocks, gas poisoning, and drug intoxication. 4,055 people committed suicide in 2013 and the number of suicides is on the rise. In 2013, the Association of Social Workers of Iran indicated that 61,000 people committed suicide in Iran from 2001 to 2011.

According to Iran's parliamentary committee on health and treatment in 2015, 12 million Iranians have mental illnesses (mostly stemming from economic reasons). According to the ministry of health, mental issues among women is a major problem and it is the second cause of death and disabilities among men.

== Women's health in Iran ==
Similar to other countries, health of Iranian women plays a crucial role in well-being and economic growth of their society. Over the years, there has been significant progress in improving physical, mental and social health of women in this country. However, various obstacles have remained to be overcome to achieve the optimal well-being of Iranian women. Therefore, it is important to understand their challenges and the underlying explanations behind them.

=== Physical Health ===
==== Life Expectancy ====
According to WHO data published in 2018, life expectancy at birth in Iran is 76.9 years for women and 74.6 for men, which is above global average: 74 years for female and 70 years for males. The leading cause of death in Iranian women is non-communicable diseases, mainly cardiovascular diseases (179 per 100,000 deaths). This can partly be due to their lack of physical activity. According to National Surveillance of Risk Factors of Non-Communicable Diseases in Iran (SuRFNCD -2007), 35% of the Iranian population of which 46% are women had a sedentary life style. In general, Iranian women have three times less physical activity than men.

==== Maternal Health ====
In 1975, maternal mortality ratio (MMR; number of maternal deaths per 100 000 livebirths) in Iran was 274, however, by year 2015, it dropped to 25 by 2015, which is comparable with developed countries. Millennium Development Goal 5 (MDG5) suggested 5.5% reduction per year in MMR. Iran is one of the countries, which was able to achieve the goal of MDG5 with reduction of 75% by the year 2015. The main cause of maternal mortality among Iranian women is obstetric hemorrhage (30.7%) followed by hypertensive disorders in pregnancy, childbirth, and the puerperium (17%). Maternal mortality occurs more frequent in rural and nomadic areas of Iran. It is estimated that 90% of these mothers had poor economic status when compared to the middle or high-class groups.

==== Sexual Health ====
===== Sexually transmitted infection (STIs) =====
Herpes simplex virus type 2 (HSV2) and chlamydia are two of the STIs with high prevalence among Iranian women. Two different studies on female sex workers showed the prevalence of HSV2 to be 9.7% and 18%. In some areas of Iran, the prevalence of chlamydia infection in Iran is higher than global and Eastern Mediterranean Region prevalence. The global estimate for chlamydia among women is reported to be 3.53% and for the Eastern Mediterranean Region is estimated to be 2.15%.

===== HIV-1 prevalence among Iranian women =====
By 2018, of the 60,000 adults living with HIV in Iran, 15,000 (25%) are woman. The proportion of women among those infected with HIV-1 has steadily increased from 6% in 2004 to 30% in 2013. Sexual transmission is the main route of HIV-1 infection among Iranian women. It has been suggested that the number of HIV-1 infected individuals are much higher; however, social stigma and discrimination might prevent many Iranians, in particular women, from admitting they are infected.

Summary of HIV/AIDS estimates among Iranian women and compared to national statistics
Adult and children living with HIV	61,000 (34,000 – 120,000)
Women living with HIV	15,000 (8900 – 30,000)
Adult and children deaths due to AIDS	2600 (1400 – 5100)
Death due to AIDS among women aged 15 and over	<500
Adult and children newly infected with HIV	4400 (1100 – 12,000)
Women newly infected with HIV	1000 (<500 – 3000)
Coverage of adults and children receiving ART (%)	20 (11 – 39)
Women aged 15 and over receiving ART (%)	27 (16 – 53)
Coverage of pregnant women who receive ARV for PMTCT (%)	81 (41 – >95)
Knowledge about HIV prevention among people aged 15–24 (%)	18.27
Knowledge about HIV prevention among women aged 15–24 (%)	16.21

=== Social health and women empowerment ===
In 2018, Iran was ranked 142 out of 149 for Global Gender Gap Index (GGI score: 0.589). As the women in many parts of the world, the gender gap in Iran is evident in all sub-indices including economic participation and opportunity (rank: 143; score: 0.376), political empowerment (rank: 141; score: 0.046), educational attempt (rank: 103; score: 0.969) and health and survival (rank: 127; score 0.966).

Iran's Global Gender Gap index (GGI) between 2006-2018
Year	Gender gap ranking	GGI
2018	142	0.5890
2017	140	0.5830
2016	139	0.5875
2015	141	0.5800
2014	137	0.5811
2013	130	0.5842
2012	127	0.5927
2011	125	0.5894
2010	123	0.5933
2009	128	0.5839
2008	116	0.6021
2007	118	0.5903
2006	108	0.5803

==== Child marriage ====
It is estimated that 17% of Iranian girls under age of 18 are married. However, thousands of such marriages are not officially registered. Child marriage in Iran is mainly driven by gender inequality, religion, poverty and traditional costume. In line with target 5.3 of Sustainable Development Goals, Iran has made a commitment to eliminate child marriage by 2030.

== See also ==
- Healthcare in Iran
- Ministry of Health and Medical Education (Iran)
- Economy of Iran
- Electromagnetic radiation and health
