= Mehdi Abdolvand =

Iranian arm wrestler (born 1982)

Personal information
- Native name: مهدی عبدالوند
- Nationality: Iranian
- Born: 1982 (age 43–44) Aligoodarz, Lorestan, Iran
- Occupations: Arm wrestler, coach
- Height: 195 cm (6 ft 5 in)
- Weight: 150 kg (331 lb)
- Sports career
- Country: Iran
- Sport: Arm wrestling
Medal record
World Arm wrestling Championships
Gold medal – first place	2013 World Arm wrestling Championships	2013 Paris
Gold medal – first place	2014 World Arm wrestling Championships	Bulgaria 2014
Asian Games
Gold medal – first place	2010 India	150 kg
World Arm wrestling Championships
Gold medal – first place	More than 19 times	150 kg

Mehdi Abdolvand (Persian: مهدی عبدالوند; born 1982) is an Iranian arm wrestler and coach from Aligoodarz, Lorestan Province. He has represented Iran in national and international arm-wrestling competitions and has competed in Asian championships, professional international tournaments, and major professional supermatches.

Abdolvand became known in Iran through a series of national titles and international appearances. Persian-language sources have described him as a multiple-time Iranian national overall champion and a two-time Asian overall champion, with one Asian runner-up finish.

== Early life and education ==
Abdolvand was born in 1982 in Aligoodarz, Lorestan Province, Iran. Persian-language biographical material identifies him as a native of Aligoodarz and states that he completed university studies in civil engineering before continuing his education in sports management.

According to a biographical profile published about him, Abdolvand began strength training in 1380 in the Iranian calendar (2001–02), began specific arm-wrestling training in 1385 (2006–07), and entered his first arm-wrestling competition in 1386 (2007–08). The profile lists his height as 195 cm and his competition weight as approximately 150 kg.

Abdolvand later lived in Khomeyni Shahr and continued his sporting career there. In an interview published in 2013, he stated that he had lived in Khomeyni Shahr for 14 years and was studying sports management at the graduate level at Islamic Azad University, Khorasgan Branch.

== National career ==
Abdolvand became prominent in Iranian arm wrestling during the late 2000s. At the fourth Iranian national arm-wrestling championship, held in Mashhad, he won the overall right-arm title representing Lorestan. The competition included 248 athletes representing 29 teams from 16 Iranian provinces.

In 2009, Abdolvand was reported to have won the overall title at a professional-level competition in Gorgan. A contemporary Persian-language account described him as the overall champion of the competition and reported that he defeated several leading Iranian competitors.

He subsequently won a number of Iranian national titles. A report concerning the 2012 national championships in Urmia stated that Abdolvand won the right-arm title in the over-110 kg category and then defeated the winners of the other weight classes to become the overall national champion. The report described the victory as his eleventh Iranian overall championship.

A separate account of the same period reported that Abdolvand was selected as the overall champion for the tenth time at an earlier national competition.

== Asian championships ==
Abdolvand competed at the Asian Armwrestling Championships and won the overall title in India in 2010. The public-relations office of Islamic Azad University, Aligoodarz Branch, reported that the university held a ceremony to honor him following his Asian championship victory in India. Persian-language accounts of his career state that Abdolvand won the Asian overall title in India in 2010, finished as runner-up at the Asian championships in Kazakhstan in 2011, and won another Asian overall title at the 2012 championships in Iran. The 2012 competition was particularly significant in his domestic career, as reports described him as the overall champion after winning the heavyweight category.

== International career ==
=== Nemiroff World Cup ===
In 2012, Abdolvand was invited to compete in the Nemiroff World Cup in Warsaw, Poland. A contemporary report stated that the tournament was scheduled for 9–11 October 2012 and that Abdolvand had received an invitation to compete in the heavyweight category. According to a report from the public-relations office of Islamic Azad University, Abdolvand reached the round of 16 before losing to a Belarusian competitor after suffering an elbow injury. The report stated that he had defeated competitors from Poland, Sweden, Russia, Belgium and Africa in earlier rounds.An interview published in 2013 stated that Abdolvand had finished ninth among 33 competitors at a professional tournament in Poland.

=== X-Men Paris 2013 ===
Abdolvand competed in the X-Men Paris arm-wrestling tournament in 2013. XSportNews published video coverage of his right-arm final against Bulgarian arm wrestler Krasimir Kostadinov in the +95 kg category. XSportNews also identified Abdolvand as an Iranian arm-wrestling champion in its coverage of international competitions.

=== World Armwrestling League Bulgaria 2014 ===
In September 2014, Abdolvand competed at the World Armwrestling League event in Bulgaria. XSportNews published results based on the official results from Armfight, placing Abdolvand third overall in the 150 kg category. He scored fifth place in the left-arm competition and first place in the right-arm competition, for a total of 196 points and third place overall. The published results placed Alexey Semerenko first, Georgi Tsvetkov second and Abdolvand third.

== Television ==
In 2019, Abdolvand appeared on the Iranian television talent show Asre Jadid (New Era) as an arm wrestler. Persian-language coverage reported his appearance on the program and identified him as an athlete from Aligoodarz.

The first season of New Era listed Mehdi Abdolvand among its contestants in the arm-wrestling category, representing Aligoodarz. The season's published results list 1,736,647 public votes for his appearance.

Persian-language media also published biographical coverage of Abdolvand in connection with his appearance on the program.

== East vs. West ==
On 26 August 2023, Abdolvand competed against American arm wrestler Derek Smith at East vs West 9 in Istanbul, Turkey. The official event card listed the contest as a right-arm supermatch. Golds Arm's athlete database records the match as a best-of-five right-arm contest and lists Smith as the winner. It records Abdolvand as representing Iran.

== Coaching and other activities ==
Persian-language biographical material describes Abdolvand as both an athlete and coach. It also states that he was involved in promoting arm wrestling and in the development of specialized training equipment for the sport.He has also been associated with the promotion and teaching of arm-wrestling techniques in Iran.

=== Notable matches/tournaments ===
Year	Opponent	Result	Hand	Outcome	Event
2023	Derek Smith	Loss	Right Hand	1-3	East vs West 9

== See also ==
- Krasimir Kostadinov
- Derek Smith
- Alexey Semerenko
- Georgi Tsvetkov
- Andriy Pushkar
- Wagner Bortolato
- New Era (TV series)
