= Bodybuilding in Iran =

- Country: Iran
- National team(s): Iran

Bodybuilding in Iran is organized and the national federation is internationally recognised. Bodybuilders from the country have competed in international events. There are gyms for bodybuilding in Iran.

== History ==
In 2013, the Kazakhstani Bodybuilding and Fitness Federation hosted the Asian Championship in Almaty at the Baluan Sholak Sport Palace. Omid Hatamabadi competed in the men's heavyweight group. Mahdi Ayari in the master men's category 40-49 years old competition.

== Gyms ==
Gyms in the country where bodybuilders train include Bradaran Ayari Club which is located in Tehran.

== Governance ==
The country has a national organization that is a recognized by the International Federation of Bodybuilding and Fitness as a national federation, representing the country's bodybuilding community. The national federation is a member of the Asian Bodybuilding and Physique Sports Federation.
