= Amputee football in Turkey =

Overview of amputee football in the Republic of Turkey

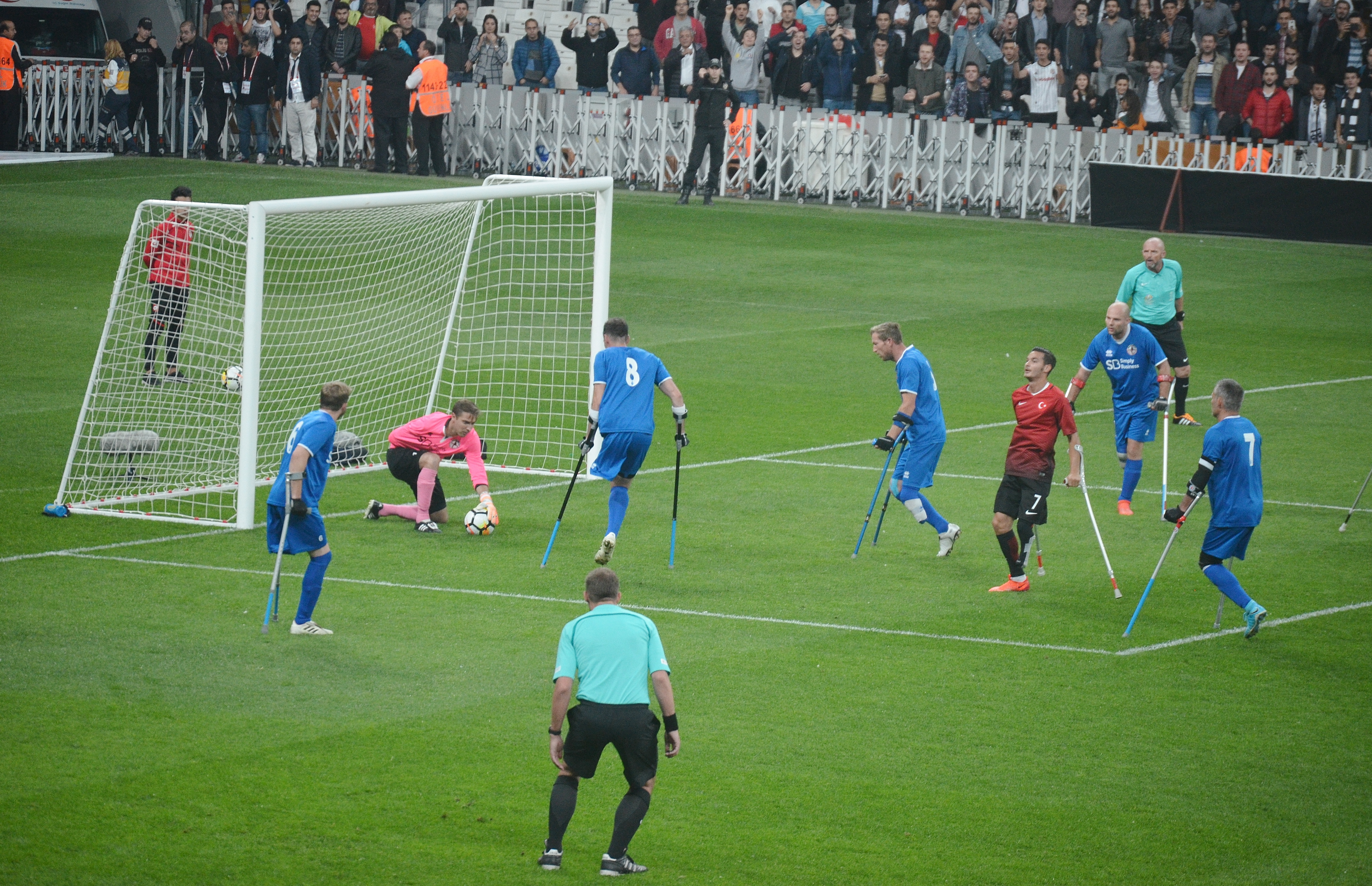
- 2017 European Amputee Football Championship final match Turkey /red/black) vs England (blue) at Vodafone Park in Istanbul, Turkey.
- Country: Turkey
- Governing body: Turkish Physicakky Disabled Sports Federation (TBESF)
- National team: National amputee team

International competitions
- Amputee Football World Cup; European Amputee Football Championship

Amputee football was first played in Turkey in 2003, the first nation-wide competition was held in 2004, and the first international participation took place the same year. The sport is governed by the Turkish Physically Disabled Sports Federation ("Türkiye Bedensel Engelliler Spor Federasyonu", TBESF), and supported by the Turkish Football Federation ("Türkiye Futbol Federasyonu", TFF).

== History ==
Created in 1982, amputee football was developed for athletes having a physical impairment with unilateral lower and upper limb amputation. The disabled sport became international in 1985.

Amputee football started in Turkey for rehabilitation purposes within the Turkish Armed Forces in 2003, and attracted later scientific research by the Sports Medicine discipline in Turkey.

== Domestic ==
In May 2003, the "Karagücü Amputee Football" team, supported by the Turkish Land Forces ("Türk Kara Kuvvetleri") were founded, and started activities in accordance with the rules of the World Amputee Football Federation (WAFF). Amputee football was played in the beginning at regional level. Necessary applications were made to the Turkish Physically Disabled Sports Federation (TBESF) for the recognition of this sport in Turkey, for the establishment of a league, and for including amputee football in the 2004 activity program of the TBESF. Amputee football was included into the TBESF as the 12th branch in 2004.

The first nation-wide competition was the "Ghazi Tournament" (in honor of "Ghazi Mustafa Kemal, founder of the Turkish Republic) held in 2004. The first Turkish Amputee Football Championship was held in Trabzon with seven registered teams on 4–12 March 2007.

Preliminary preparations for the establishment of a league were made in 2008 by organizing a competition, at which eleven teams participated. Competition instructions and referee guidelines were worked our by the Central Referee Committee. In August 2009, the Amputee Football League was established in Turkey. The TBESF governs the ampute football leagues "Super League", "First League" and "Second League" as well as the" Turkey Cup", which are supported by the Turkish Football Federation (TFF). In the 2021–22 season, a total of 34 clubs from 19 cities all over the country competed in three leagues.

City	Number of clubs			
City	Super League	First League	Second League	Total
Adana	-	-	1	1
Ankara	3	1	-	4
Antalya	-	1	-	1
Batman	-	-	1	1
Bursa	-	1	-	1
Denizli	1	-	-	1
Gaziantep	1	-	3	4
Istanbul	3	2	-	5
İzmir	1	-	-	1
Kahramanmaraş	-	-	1	1
Kayseri	1	1	-	2
Kocaeli	-	-	1	1
Konya	1	1	-	2
Malatya	1	-	-	1
Mersin	-	1	-	1
Sakarya	-	-	2	2
Samsun	-	1	1	2
Şanlıurfa	1	-	-	1
Trabzon	1	-	1	2
Total	14	9	11	34

=== Turkish Amputee Football Super League ===
Turkish Amputee Football Super League is the top-level league in Turkey. In the 2021–22 season, the Super League was played by following 14 clubs:

Club	City
Anadolu Erciyes Engelliler SK	Kayseri
Denizli Engelliler SK	Denizli
Etmesgut Bld. Ampute SK	Ankara
Esengücü Engelliler SK	Istanbul
İzmir BBGSK	İzmir
Konya Engellilergücü SK	Konya
Malatya BBSK	Malatya
ODTÜ SK	Ankara
Pendik Engelliler SK	Istanbul
Şahinbey Belediye GSK	Gaziantep
Şanlıurfa SK	Şanlıurfa
Şişli Yeditepe Engelliler SK	Istanbul
Trabzon Ortahisar Belde SK	Trabzon
TSK Rehab. Merkezi Engelliler SK	Ankara

==== History ====
Year	Champion	Runners-up	Third place
2009–10	AYBESK (1)	?	?
2010–11	AYBESK (2)	Kara Kuvvetleri Gücü	?
2011–12	AYBESK (3)	?	?
2012–13	AYBESK (4)	Kara Kuvvetleri Gücü	Kayseri Melikgazi Belediyespor
2013–14	AYBESK (5)	TSK Rehabilitasyon Merkezi ESK	İstanbul Özürlüler SK
2014–15	AYBESK (6)	TSK Rehabilitasyon Merkezi ESK	Şahinbey Belediyespor
2015–16	Ortotek Gaziler SK (1)	TSK Rehabilitasyon Merkezi ESK	Şahinbey Belediyespor
2016–17	Ortotek Gaziler SK (2)	Şişli Yeditepe Engelliler SK	Pendik Belediyesi BESK
2017–18	Ortotek Gaziler SK (3)	TSK Rehabilitasyon Merkezi ESK	Şahinbey Belediyespor
2018–19	Şahinbey Belediyespor (1)	Ortotek Gaziler SK	Pendik Belediyesi BESK
2019–20	Şahinbey Belediyespor	Etimesgut Belediyespor	İzmir Büyükşehir Belediyespor
2020–21	Etimesgut Belediyespor (1)	Şahinbey Belediyespor	İzmir Büyükşehir Belediyespor
2021–22	Etimesgut Belediyespor (2)	Şahinbey Belediyespor	İzmir Büyükşehir Belediyespor
2022–23	Şahinbey Belediyespor (2)	Alves Kablo Ampute FK	Etimesgut Belediyespor
2023–24	Alves Kablo Ampute FK (1)	Şahinbey Belediyespor	Pendik Belediyesi BESK
2024–25	Şahinbey Belediyespor (3)	Alves Kablo Ampute FK	Trabzon Büyükşehir Ampute FK

=== Turkish Amputee Football First League ===
The Turkish Amputee Football First League is the second-level league of the amputee football in Turkey. In the 2021-22 seaspn, it consisted of following 9 clubs:

Ckub	City
Antalya BB Asat SK	Antalya
Başakşehir AMpute Futbol K	Istanbul
Bursa AMpute AK	Bursa
İstanbul Özürlüler SK	Istanbul
Melikgazi Belediye BGSK	Kayseri
MP Samsun Engelligücü SK	Samsun
Olimpik Yetenekler SK	Mersin
Uysal Hydraulic Konya Bedensel Engelliler SK	Konya
Yenimalle Engelligücü SK	Ankara

=== Turkish Amputee Football Second League ===
The Turkish Amputee Football Second League is the third-level league in Turkey. In the 2021–22 season, following 11 clubs competed in the league:

Club	City
Adana Ampute Engelliler SK	Adana
Batman Ampute SK	Batman
Gaziantep Ampute SK	Gaziantep
Gaziantep Bedensel Engelliler SK	Gaziantep
Gürbulak Belediye SK	Trabzon
Kahramanmaraş Ampute SK	Kahramanmaraş
Kocaeli Gebze Gücü Engelliler SK	Kocaeli
Sakarya Akgün Ampute Engelliler Boks SK	Sakarya
Sakarya Ampute Engelliler SK	Sakarya
Samsun Bedensel Engelliler SK	Samsun
Şehitkamil Engelliler SK	Gaziantep

== International ==
The Turkey national team competed for the first time at the European Amputee Football Championship of 2004 held in Kyiv, Ukraine on 27 May-2 June, and became runners-up.

The national team played two friendly matches in London, England on 3-8 July 2005 to gain experience for the then-upcoming World Championship. Turkey's world-level debut was at the 2005 World Championship in Rio de Janeiro, Brazil on 11–21 August, where they placed fifth. For preparations to the next World Championship, the national team held a joint training camp in Ankara with the England team in May 2007, and played two friendly matches. The first medal for Turkey came in bronze at the 2007 World Championship hosted by Turkey in Antalya on 11–21 November. Three more consecutive bronze medals followed in 2010 Crespo, 2012 Kaliningrad and 2014 Culiacán. The silver medal was won at the 2018 Guadalajara. The national team became world champions at the 2022 World Cup in Istanbul after defeating Angola in the final by 4–1.

Organized by the TBESF and TFF, Turkey hosted the European Amputee Football Championship in Antalya on 1–6 December 2008. The Turkey team took the silver medal losing to Russia 2–0 in the last match. In February 2015, Turkey was among the founding member countries of the European Amputee Football Federation (EAFF). The first official edition of the European championship organized by the EAFF took place in 2017 held in Istanbul. Turkey won the champion title by defeating England 2–1 in the final. Turkey won a second European gold medal in Kraków, Poland in 2021 beating Spain 5–0 in the final.
