= Kemal Güleş =

Turkish amputee footballer

Personal information
- Date of birth: 1999 (age 26–27)
- Place of birth: Şırnak, Turkey
- Position: Forward

Team information
- Current team: Etimesgut BS

International career
Years	Team	Apps	(Gls)
- Turkey
Medal record
Representing Turkey
World Cup
Gold medal – first place	2022 Istanbul	Turkey
Silver medal – second place	2018 San Juan de los Lagos	Turkey
European Championship
Gold medal – first place	2021 Kraków	Turkey
Gold medal – first place	2027 Istanbul	Turkey

Kemal Güleş (born 1999) is a Turkish amputee footballer who plays as a forward. He is a member of the Turkey national amputee football team.

Kemal Güleş was born in Şırnak, Turkey in 1999. As a result of a rockslide accident at a construction site in 2011, his left leg was amputated below the knee after treatment in hospitals in Şırnak, Diyarbakır and Ankara.

== Sport career ==
He was introduced into amputee football by ampute footballer Osman Çakmak during his stay in the rehabilitation hospital in Ankara. He remembers that he fell around hundred times during the first training. He became an amputee footballer, and finally was admitted to the Turkey national team.

== Honours ==
International

World Cup
Winners (1): 2022
Runners-up (1): 2018

European Championship
Winners (2): 2017, 20121
