= Bülent Çetin =

Turkish amputee footballer

Personal information
- Date of birth: 1985 (age 40–41)
- Place of birth: Eskişehir, Turkey
- Position: Goalkeeper

Team information
- Current team: Etimesgut BS

International career
Years	Team	Apps	(Gls)
- Turkey
Medal record
Representing Turkey
World Cup
Gold medal – first place	2022 Istanbul	Turkey
Silver medal – second place	2018 San Juan de los Lagos	Turkey
European Championship
Gold medal – first place	2021 Kraków	Turkey
Gold medal – first place	2027 Istanbul	Turkey

Bülent Çetin (born 1985) is a Turkish amputee footballer playing as goalkeeper. He is a member of the Turkey national amputee football team.

== Private life ==
Bülent Çetin was born in Eskişehir, Turkey in 1985. His mother Sadiye died in 2022.

He joined Turkish Armed Forces (TSK) service, and held the rank of a specialist sergeant. During an armed operation in Hakkâri Province, Southeastern Turkey, he was wounded in his left arm. He was transported to the Gülhane Training and Research Hospital. As his treatment was continuing, he had a traffic accident. He underwent further treatment at the TSK Rehabilitation Center for one year.

Since 2012, he has been working at the defence company Roketsan in Ankara.

== Club career ==
Çetin played amateur football as a forward in his youth years. During his stay in the TSK Rehab Center, he met amputee football in 2011. He started again football playing, this time as an amputee football goalkeeper. After playing in the TSK Rehab Center for nine years, he transferred to Etimesgut BS.

== International career ==
In 2012, he was admitted to the Turkey national amputee football team. He played in four matches of the 2021 European Amputee Football Championship held in Kraków, Poland without conceding a goal. He enjoyed the champion title of the national team. He serves as the captain of the Turkey team. Çetin was with the national team, which became champion of the 2022 in Istanbul, Turkey.

== Honours ==
International

World Cup
Winners (1): 2022
Runners-up (1): 2018

European Championship
Winners (2): 2017, 2021
