= Rahmi Özcan =

Turkish amputee footballer

Personal information
- Date of birth: 1990 (age 35–36)
- Place of birth: Manisa, Turkey
- Position: Midfielder

Team information
- Current team: Şahinbey BG

International career
Years	Team	Apps	(Gls)
- Turkey
Medal record
Representing Turkey
World Cup
Gold medal – first place	2022 Istanbul	Turkey
Silver medal – second place	2018 San Juan de los Lagos	Turkey
European Championship
Gold medal – first place	2021 Kraków	Turkey
Gold medal – first place	2027 Istanbul	Turkey

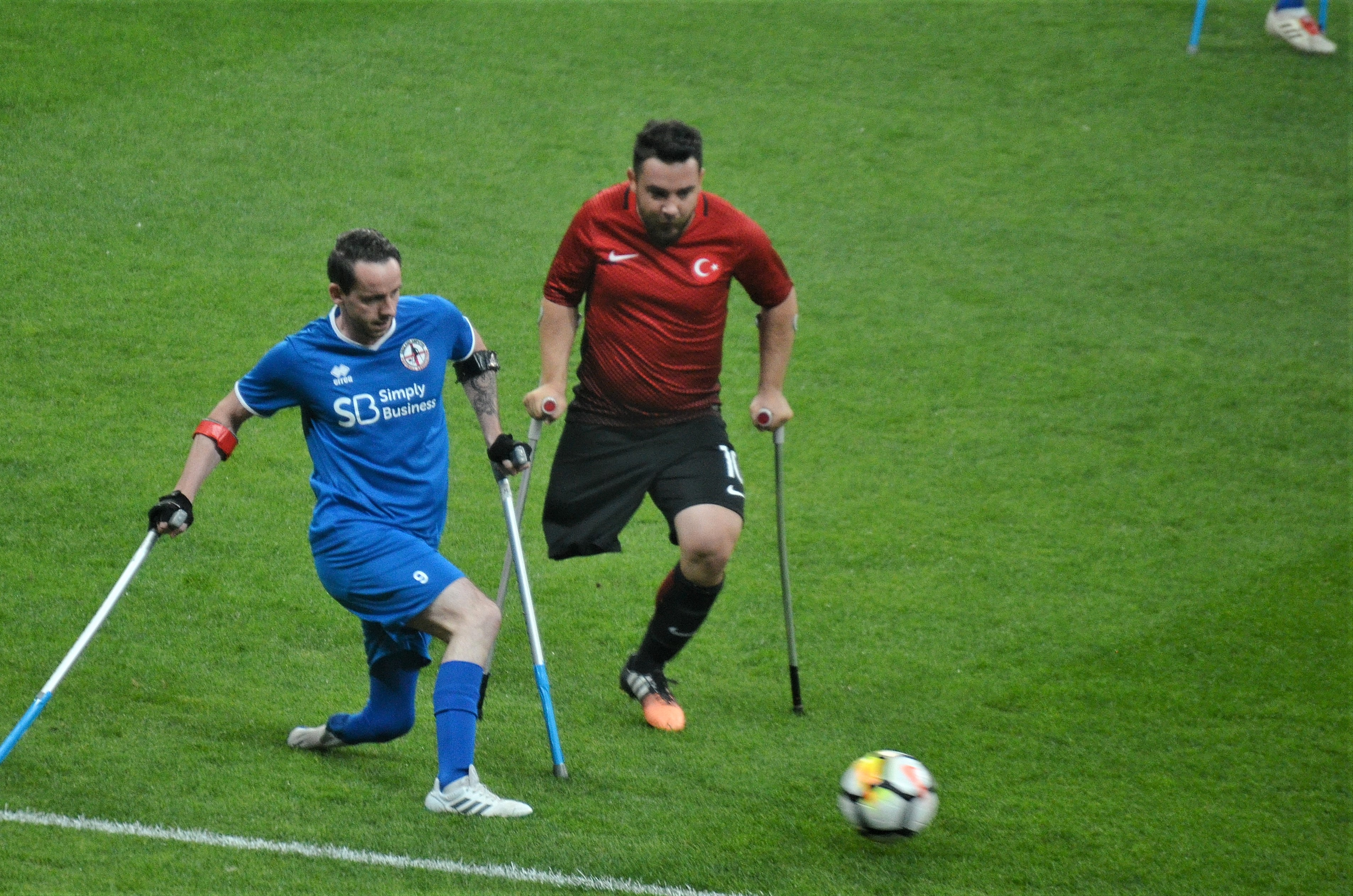
Rahmi Özcan (red/black) playing for Turkey in the 2017 European Amputee Football Championship final match against England.

Rahmi Özcan (born 1990) is a Turkish amputee footballer playing as a midfielder. He is a member of the Turkey national amputee football team.

== Private life ==
Rahmi Özcan was born in Manisa in 1990 with a birth defect of right leg deformation, which was amputated above the knee. He uses the crutch at special events only.

Özcan is married and has a daughter.

== Sport career ==
Özcan attracted the attention of the physical education teacher while he played football in the high school at age of 14. With the support of the Turkish Disabled Sports Federation, he started amputee football playing. He was called up to the Turkey national amputee football team in 2015. He became the captain of the team.

== Honours ==
International

World Cup
Winners (1): 2022
Runners-up (1): 2018

European Championship
Winners (2): 2017, 20121
