= Şeyhmus Erdinç =

Turkish amputee footballer (born 1992)

Personal information
- Date of birth: 14 August 1992 (age 34)
- Place of birth: İzmir, Turkey
- Position: Midfielder

Team information
- Current team: Etimesgut BS

International career^{‡}
| Years | Team | Apps | (Gls) |
- Turkey
Medal record
Representing Turkey
World Cup
| Gold medal – first place | 2022 Istanbul | Turkey |
| Silver medal – second place | 2018 San Juan de los Lagos | Turkey |
| Bronze medal – third place | 2014 Culiacán | Turkey |
| Bronze medal – third place | 2012 Kaliningrad | Turkey |
European Championship
| Gold medal – first place | 2021 Kraków | Turkey |
- ‡ National team caps and goals as of 9 October 2022

Şeyhmus Erdinç (born 14 August 1992) is a Turkish amputee footballer who plays as a midfielder. He is a member of the Turkey national amputee football team.

== Early life and education ==
Şeyhmus Erdinç was born as the first child of his parents in İzmir, Turkey on 14 August 1992 with a deformed left leg, which was later amputated below the knee; he started using a prosthesis. His father, who owned an apparel workshop, was an amateur footballer and took Şeyhmus to the football pitch from the age of one. His father died from tuberculosis when Şeyhmus was six years old, leaving him and his sister to be raised by their mother Necah and grandfather.

Upon finishing high school, he studied at the Vocational School of Physical Education in Gazi University, Ankara. After passing the Disabled Public Personnel Selection Exam of the Ministry of National Education in 2018, he was appointed in 2019 as a physical education teacher in Ankara. As a teacher, he developed a calm demeanour in order to be a role model for his students, in contrast to his youth, when he was more aggressive.

== Sport career ==
Erdinç played football at home with balls he made out of crumpled paper, after his mother refused to buy him a football because she did not want him playing the sport. He started performance training in amputee football at the youth level, after convincing his mother to change her mind. In 2009, Erdinç met an amputee footballer at the prosthesis repair shop, who invited him to play at Altay SK. He learned to move with a crutch, obtained his license, and became an amputee footballer in 2010. Later, during a national team preparation camp, he met the head coach of the club Etimesgut BS, who had been amputated in his thirties. He invited Erdinç to move to Ankara to join his amputee football team. Erdinç agreed and continued his high school study there.

After playing six months for Altay, he was called up to the Turkey national amputee football team. In 2011, he became a permanent member of the national team. Since then, he has been playing in the midfielder position, and was part of the team that won the championship title at the 2022 Amputee Football World Cup in Istanbul.

He debuted internationally at the 2012 World Cup held in Kaliningrad, Russia, scoring four goals in four matches. The national team returned home with a bronze medal. His further participations were at the World Cups in 2014 Culiacán, Mexico (bronze medal), 2016, 2018 San Juan de los Lagos, Mexico (silver medal), 2022 Istanbul, Turkey (gold medal), as well as at the European Championships in 2021 Kraków, Poland (gold medal).

== Honours ==
International

World Cup
Winners (1): 2022
Runners-up (1): 2018
Third places (2): 2012, 2014
European Championship
Winners (1): 2021
