= Ömer Güleryüz =

Turkish amputee footballer

Personal information
- Date of birth: 1997 (age 28–29)
- Place of birth: Istanbul, Turkey
- Position: Forward

Team information
- Current team: Wisła Krakow

International career
Years	Team	Apps	(Gls)
- Turkey
Medal record
Representing Turkey
World Cup
Gold medal – first place	2022 Istanbul	Turkey
Silver medal – second place	2018 San Juan de los Lagos	Turkey
European Championship
Gold medal – first place	2021 Kraków	Turkey
Gold medal – first place	2027 Istanbul	Turkey

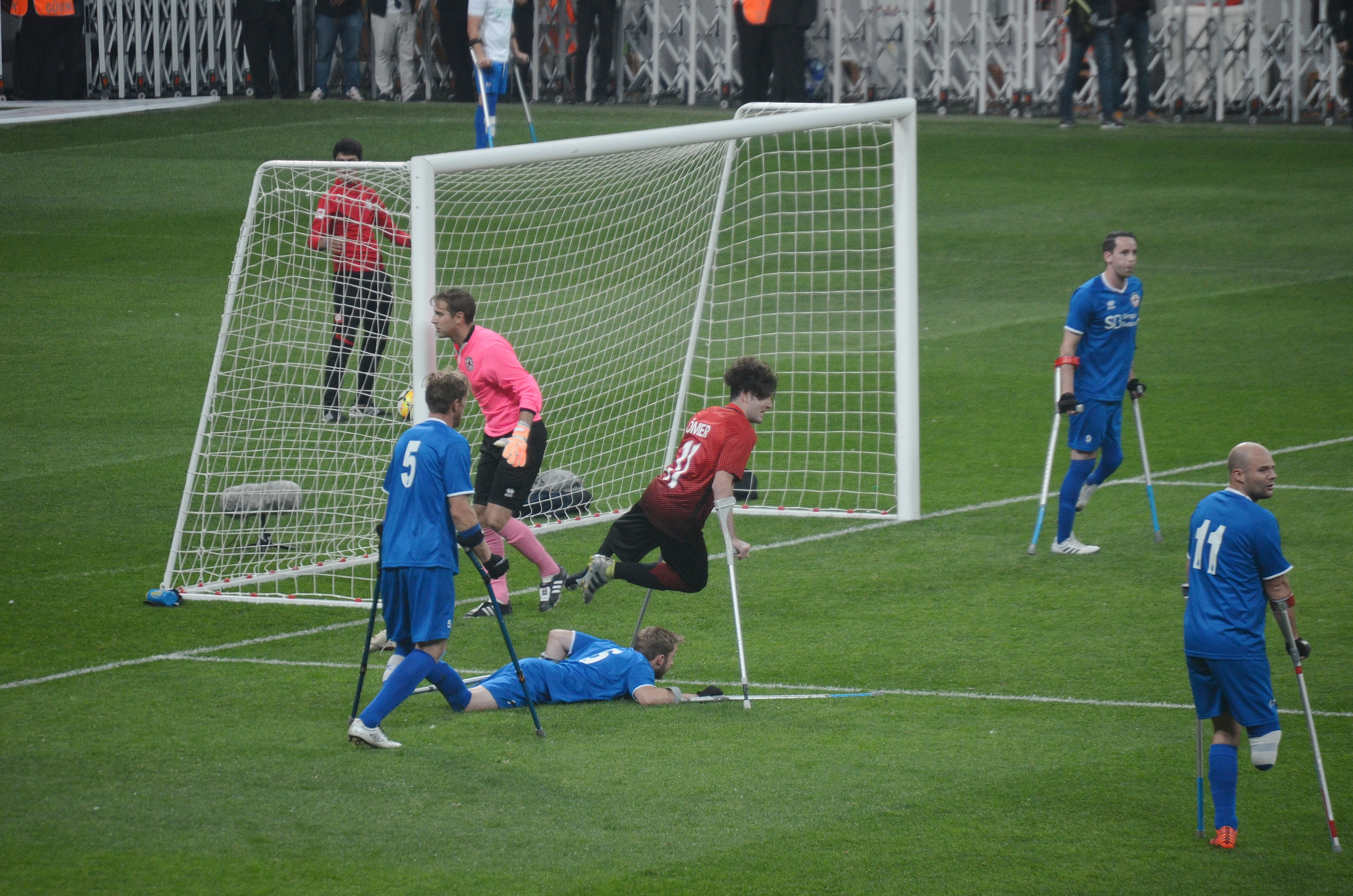
Ömer Güleryüz (red/black) scoring a goal for Turkey in the 2017 European Amputee Football Championship final match against England.

Ömer Güleryüz (born 1997) is a Turkish amputee footballer who plays as forward for the Turkey national amputee football team.

Ömer Güleryüz was born in 1997 with congenital anomaly of a short left leg. He started playing football at age six. In his childhood, he used to play football by hoping as he had no crutches. At age of 13, he attracted attention while playing football on the street. He entered Yeditepe Sports Club of amputee football in Istanbul, Turkey. In 2013, he was called up for the first time to the Turkey national team preparation camp. He became a member of the Turkey national team in the forward position. He became top goalscorer netting 30 goals in the Turkish Amputee Football League in 2018. Internationally, he took part at the European Amputee Football Championship in 2017 in Turkey and 2021 in Poland. He played at the 2018 Amputee Football World Cup in Mexico. He performed a hat-trick in the group match against Italy, and again another one in the final game against Spain. Güleryüz was awarded the titles Top goalscorer and the Most valuable player of the tournament.

Professionally playing for Wisła Krakow, Güleryuz sis a student of Physical Education and Sports at Istanbul University.

== Honours ==
International

World Cup
Winners (1): 2022
Runners-up (1): 2018

European Championship
Winners (2): 2017, 2021, 2024

Individual
Top goalscorer: 2021 European Championship (11 goals)
Most valuable player: 2021 European Championship
