= Osman Çakmak =

Turkish football player and coach

Personal information
- Date of birth: 1977 (age 48–49)
- Place of birth: Narlıkışla, Zile, Tokat, Turkey

Senior career*
Years	Team	Apps	(Gls)
- Zeytinburnuspor
2010–	Karagücü Amputee FC		

International career
2010–2019	Turkey national amputee football		

Managerial career
- 2020–: Turkey national amputee football
- * Club domestic league appearances and goals

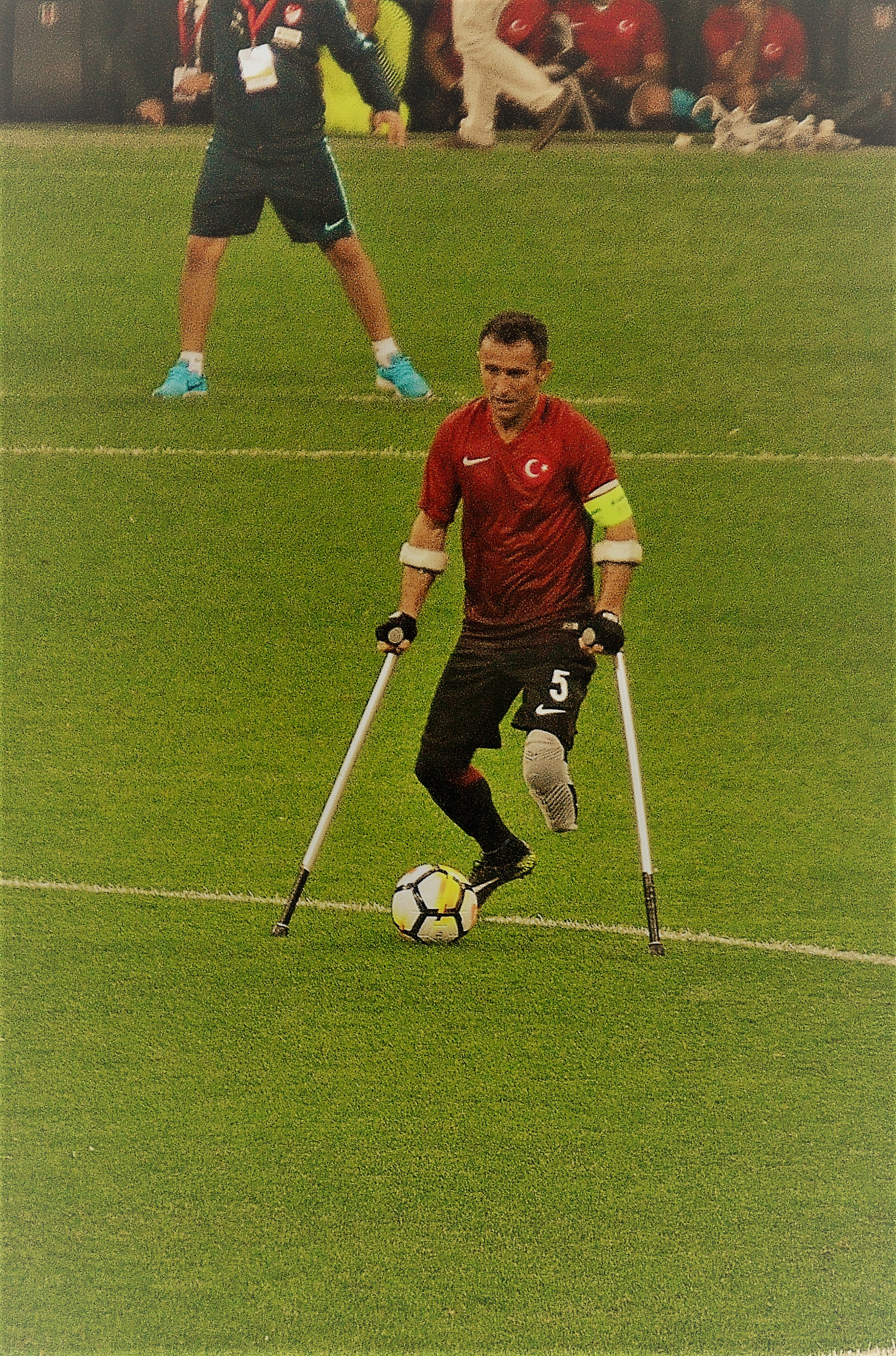
Osman Çakmak, captain of the Turkey national amputee football team in the 2017 European Amputee Football Championship.

Osman Çakmak (born 1977) is a Turkish football player and coach who is the manager of the Turkey national amputee football team. He played as midfielder and served as the captain of the national amputee team. He played professional football before his leg was amputated below the knee, after he stepped on a landmine during military service. In 2020, he was appointed manager of the national amputee football team which won the 2021 European Amputee Football Championship under his direction.

== Private life ==
Osman Çakmak was the sixth and last child born in 1977 into a farm family in the village of Narlıkışla in the Zile district of Tokat Province, Turkey in 1977.

He was schooled in his village. After finishing primary school, he went to Istanbul with two of his brothers to look for work. Çakmak discontinued his education because of his passion for playing football. Despite his brothers' objections, he joined Zeytinburnuspor football club. Çakmak worked as a carpenter and supported his parents financially. He needed to earn more money to support his family when his brothers were conscripted, so he went to Russia as a foreign worker. Çakmak returned to Turkey and quit his football team's squad.

When he was conscripted, Çakmak chose the Commando unit and was stationed at the Iraq–Turkey border. In 1997, he stepped on an anti-personnel mine planted under a road's surface in Şenoba, Şırnak, southeastern Turkey, while he was on a road security detail, and lost his left leg below the knee.

In 2008, at the time of his therapy, while he was on his way to the military hospital in Ankara, Çakmak decided to play amputee football at the suggestion of his commanders.

In 2019, his parents were poisoned by gas leaking from a stove; his mother Sultan died, while his father was treated at an intensive care station.

== Club player career ==
=== Association football ===
Çakmak played association football professionally in his youth for Zeytinburnuspor.

=== Amputee football ===
After his release from the military hospital, he joined the amputee football team, Karagücü, a Turkish Land Forces sports club, to play in the 2010–11 Turkish Amputee Football League.

== International player career ==
In 2010, he was admitted to Turkey's national amputee team. He participated in the European and world championships in 2010, 2012 and 2014. The national team placed third among 24 nations. He captained the national team, which became champion of the 2017 European Amputee Football Championship and the runner-up of the 2018 Amputee Football World Cup.31

== Manager career ==
In 2020, he was appointed manager of the national amputee football team, which won the 2021 European Amputee Football Championship under his direction.

== Honours ==
=== Player ===
World Cup
- Runners-up (1): 2018

European Championship
- Winners (1): 2017

=== Manager ===
World Cup
- Winners (1): 2022

European Championship
31
- Winners (1): 2021
