= Erdinç =

Erdinç is a Turkish given name for males and a surname. People named Erdinç include:

== Given name ==
- Erdinç Balto (born 1991), Turkish basketball player
- Erdinç Kebapçı (born 1993), Turkish trap shooter
- Erdinç Saçan (born 1979), Dutch politician of Turkish descent
- Erdinç Tekir (born 1966), Abkhaz-Turkish hijacker
- Erdinç Türksever (born 1985), Turkish alpine skier
- Erdinç Yavuz (born 1978), Turkish footballer

== Surname ==
- Erol Erdinç (born 1945), Turkish classical pianist and conductor
- Mehmet Şükrü Erdinç (born 1976), Turkish politician
- Mevlüt Erdinç (born 1987), Franco-Turkish footballer
- Şeyhmus Erdinç (born 1992), Turkish amputee footballer
