= Fatih Şentürk =

Turkish amputee footballer

Fatih Şentürk is a Turkish amputee footballer who plays as a midfielder.

== Career ==
Şentürk helped Turkey win the 2022 Amputee Football World Cup, which was held in Istanbul. This was Turkey's only World Cup win.
