= 2006 European Amputee Football Championship =

Tournament details
- Host country: Russia
- City: Volgograd
- Dates: 24–30 September
- Teams: 8

Final positions
- Champions: Russia (1st title)
- Runners-up: (United Kingdom) Great Britain
- Third place: Uzbekistan
- Fourth place: Ukraine

Tournament statistics
- Matches played: 18
- Goals scored: 56 (3.11 per match)
- Top scorer: (Russia) Dmitriy Udalov (6 goals)
- Best player: (Russia) Dmitriy Udalov

The 2006 European Amputee Football Championship was the 2nd edition of the international competition of european amputee football national men's teams. It was organized by the World Amputee Football Federation (WAFF), had the "open" status, and was held in Volgograd, Russia between 24 and 30 September 2006.

Russia won the title for the first time, defeating Great Britain in the final. Uzbekistan became bronze medalist before Ukraine.

== Participating nations ==
Following eight nations competed in two groups. The first two ranking teams in each group qualified for the knockout stage.

- (United Kingdom) Great Britain
- Iran
- Moldova
- Russia
- Sierra Leone
- Turkey
- Ukraine
- Uzbekistan

== Preliminary round ==
=== Group A ===
Team	Pld	W	D	L	GF	GA	GD	P
Russia	3	3	0	0	14	4	+10	9
(United Kingdom) Great Britain	3	2	0	1	9	5	+4	6
Iran	3	1	0	2	10	4	+6	3
Moldova	3	0	0	3	0	20	−20	0

24 September 2006
Russia	(Russia)	4 – 3	(United Kingdom)	Great Britain
Iran	(Iran)	8 – 0	(Moldova)	Moldova
25 September 2006
Russia	(Russia)	2 – 1	(Iran)	Iran
Great Britain	(United Kingdom)	4 – 0	(Moldova)	Moldova
26 September 2006
Russia	(Russia)	8 – 0	(Moldova)	Moldova
Great Britain	(United Kingdom)	2 – 1	(Iran)	Iran

=== Group B ===
Team	Pld	W	D	L	GF	GA	GD	P
Uzbekistan	3	3	0	0	5	0	+5	9
Ukraine	3	1	1	1	3	1	+2	4
Turkey	3	1	1	1	1	2	-1	4
Sierra Leone	3	0	0	3	0	6	−6	0

24 September 2006
Uzbekistan	(Uzbekistan)	2 – 0	(Turkey)	Turkey
25 September 2006
Ukraine	(Ukraine)	0 – 0	(Turkey)	Turkey
Uzbekistan	(Uzbekistan)	2 – 0	(Sierra Leone)	Sierra Leone
26 September 2006
Uzbekistan	(Uzbekistan)	1 – 0	(Ukraine)	Ukraine
Turkey	(Turkey)	1 – 0	(Sierra Leone)	Sierra Leone
27 September 2006
Ukraine	(Ukraine)	3 – 0	(Sierra Leone)	Sierra Leone

== Knockout stage ==
Semi-finals
29 September 2006
Russia	2
Ukraine	0
29 September 2006
Uzbekistan	1 (4)
(United Kingdom) Great Britain	1 (5)

Final
30 September 2006
Russia	5
(United Kingdom) Great Britain	1
Third place
30 September 2006
Ukraine	0
Uzbekistan	1

=== Semi-finals ===
29 September 2006
Uzbekistan	(Uzbekistan)	1 – 1 (pen. 4 – 5)	(United Kingdom)	Great Britain
Russia	(Russia)	2 – 0	(Ukraine)	Ukraine

=== 7th place match ===
28 September 2006
Moldova	(Moldova)	1 – 0	(Sierra Leone)	Sierra Leone

=== 5th place match ===
28 September 2006
Iran	(Iran)	3 – 2	(Turkey)	Turkey

=== Bronze medal match ===
30 September 2006
Ukraine	(Ukraine)	0 – 1	(Uzbekistan)	Uzbekistan

=== Gold medal match ===
30 September 2006
Russia	(Russia)	5 – 1	(United Kingdom)	Great Britain

== Rankings ==
Rank	Team
1	Russia
2	(United Kingdom) Great Britain
3	Uzbekistan
4	Ukraine
5	Iran
6	Turkey
7	Moldova
8	Sierra Leone

2006 European Amputee Football Championship
(Russia)
Russia
First title
