= TFF Riva Facility =

Football training facility in Turkey

Coordinates: 41°13′06″N 29°12′53″E

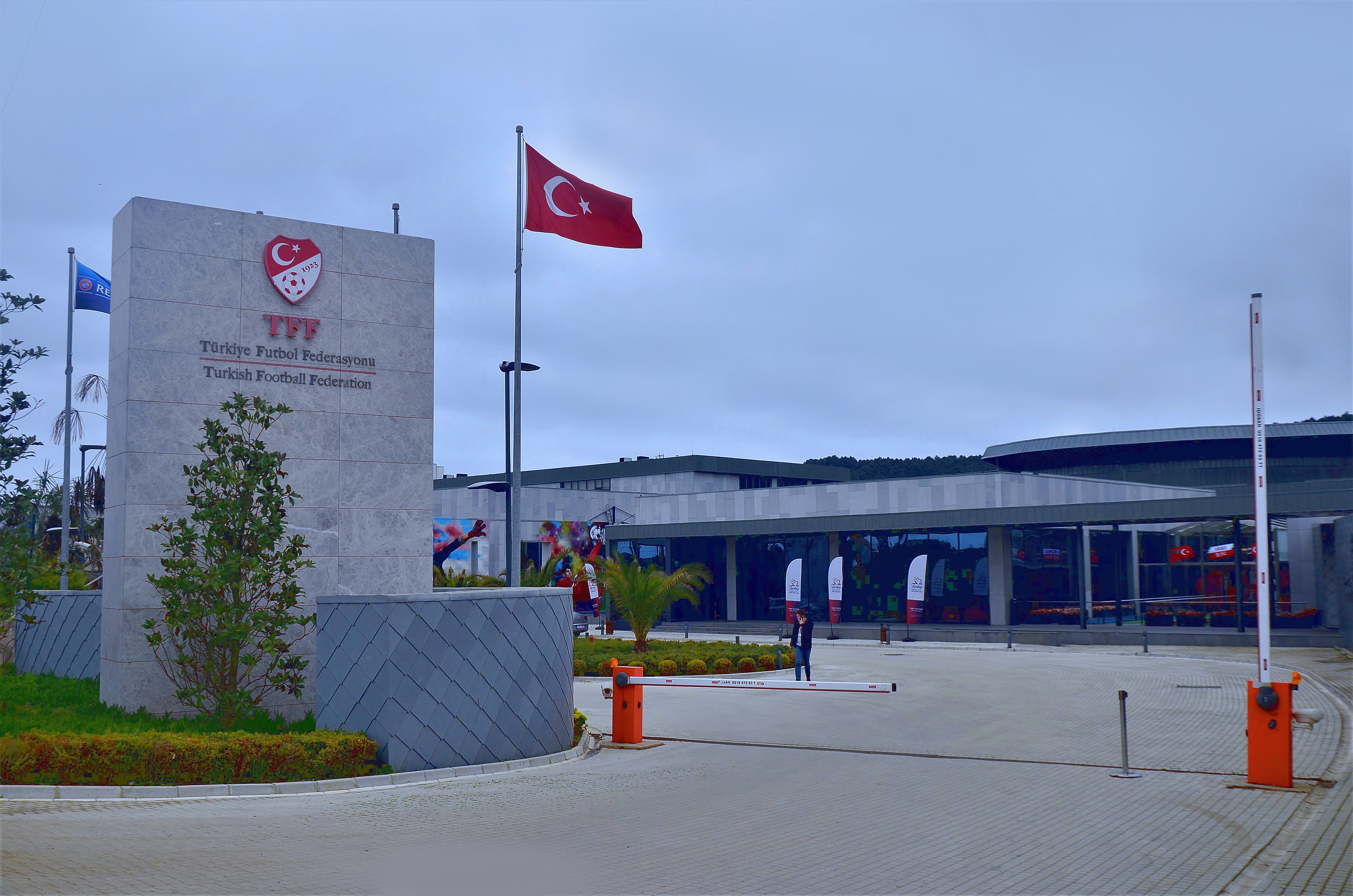
Main entrance to the TFF Riva Facility.

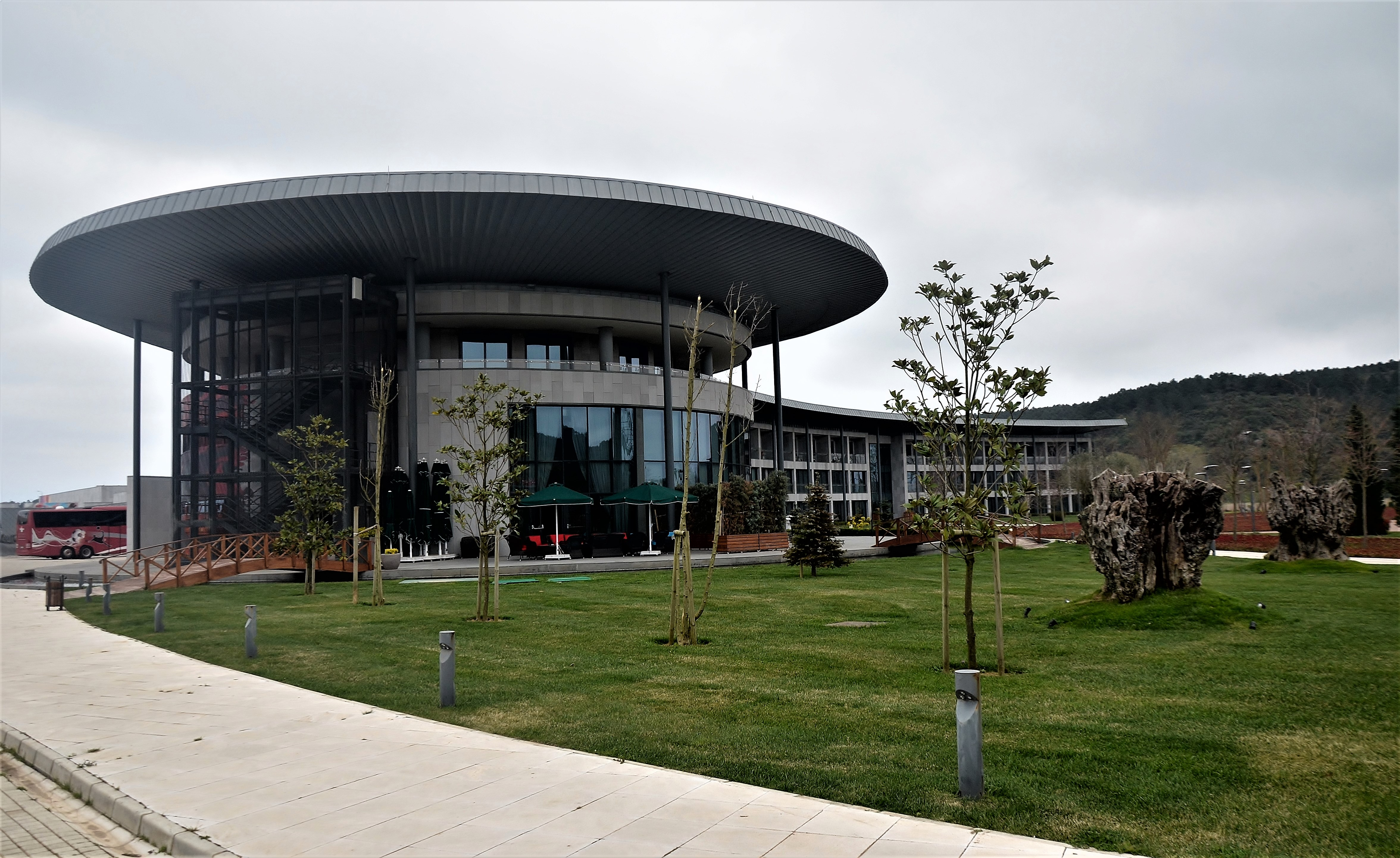
Buildings of the TFF Riva Facility.

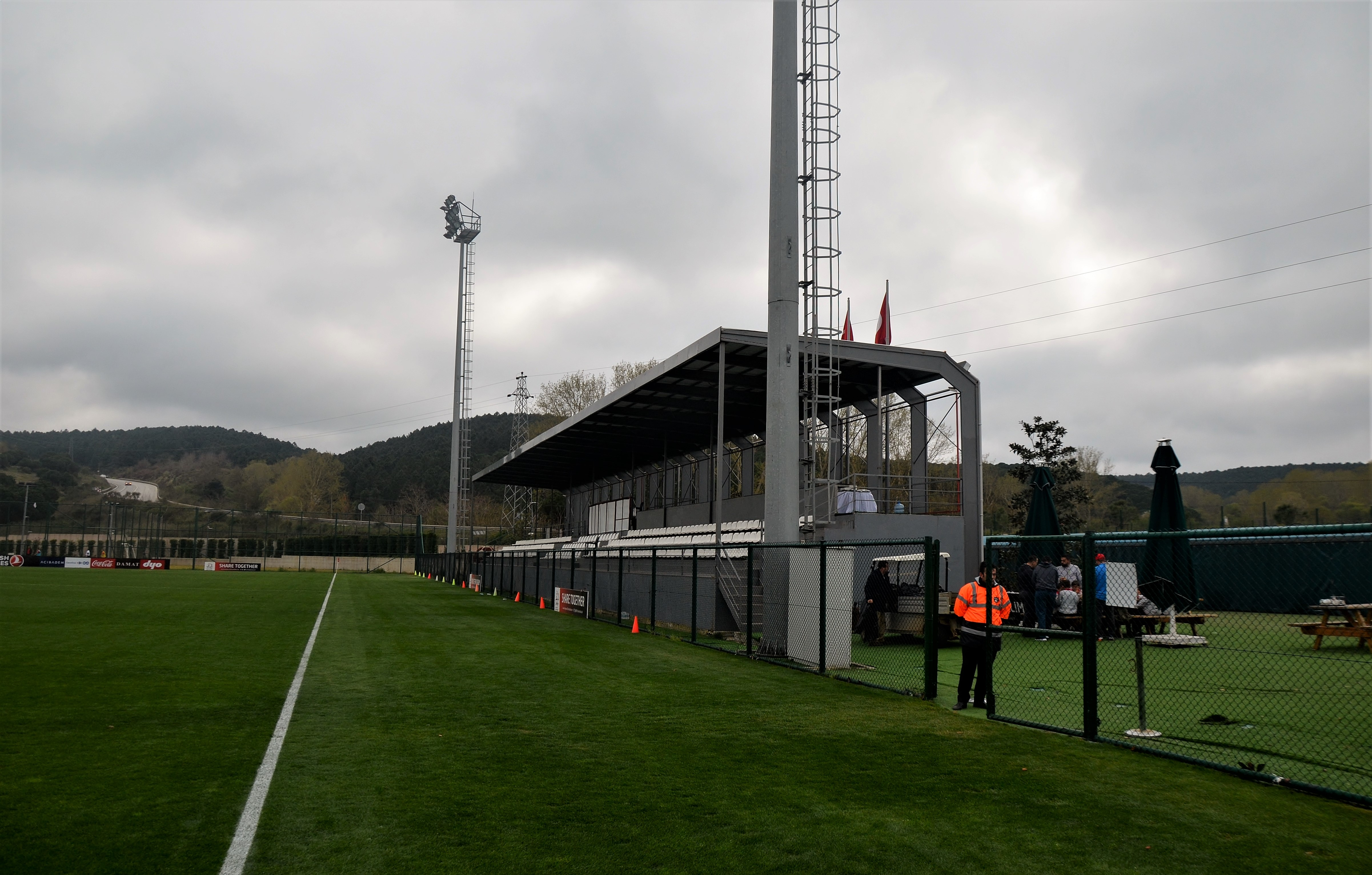
100-spectator capacity bleacher of Football Field #4.

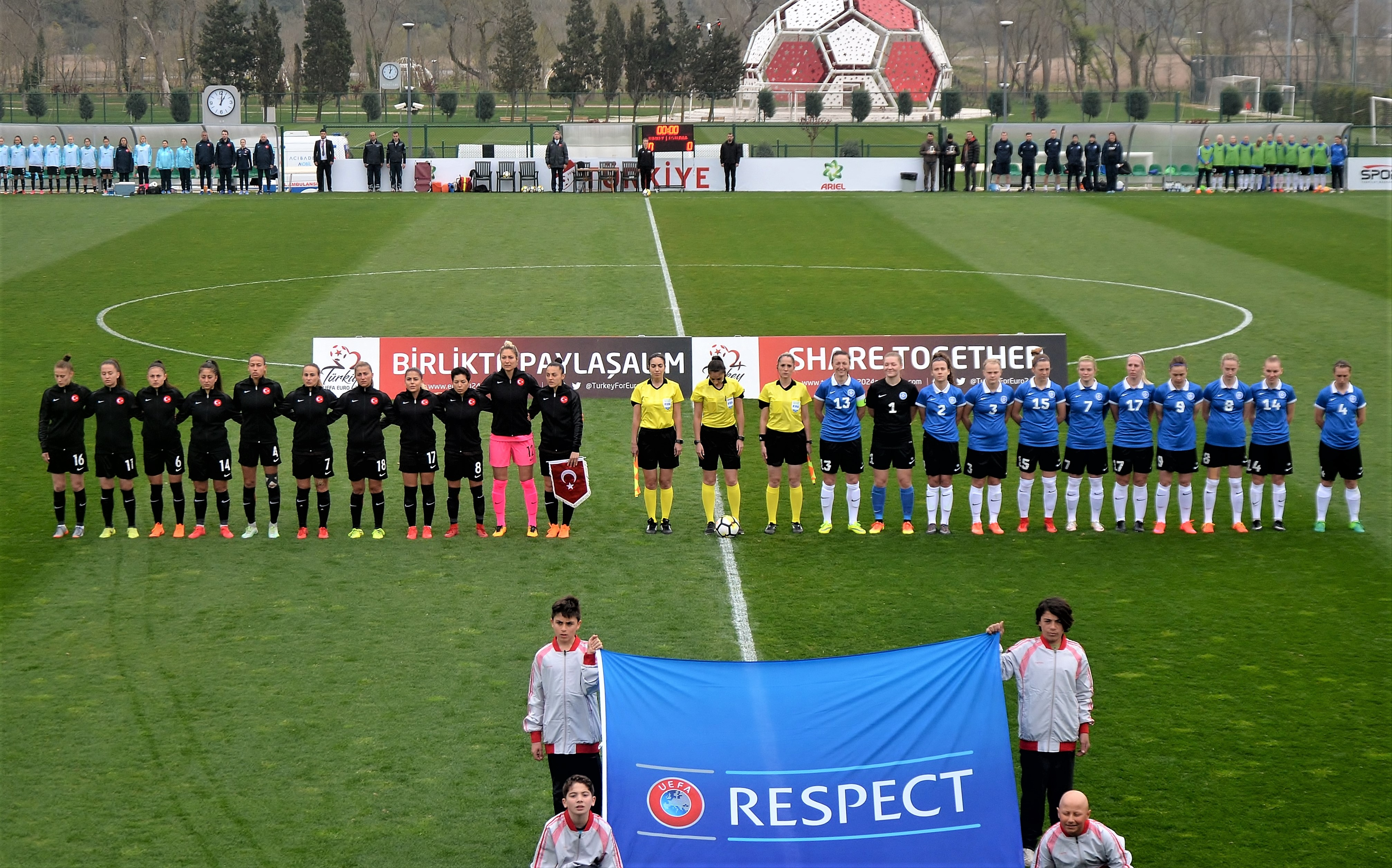
Starting ceremony before the friendly match of Turkey women's (black) vs Estonia (blue/black) at Football Field #4 in April 2018.

TFF Riva Facility, short for Turkish Football Federation Riva Hasan Doğan National Teams Camp and Training Facility, (Turkish: Türkiye Futbol Federasyonu Riva Hasan Doğan Milli Takımlar Kamp ve Eğitim Tesisleri), is a facility of the Turkish Football Federation (TFF) for camping and training purposes of all Turkish national football teams. It is located in Istanbul Province, Turkey.

The facility is situated in Riva village of Beykoz district in the north of Istanbul Province west of Riva River. It was officially opened on July 4, 2014, and was named in honor of Hasan Doğan (1956–2008), whose presidency at TFF lasted only several months due to his unexpected death. Owned and operated by TFF, it consists of three building blocks; Block A for offices and conference rooms, Block B for health care and swimming pools and Block C for accommodation and restaurants. The covering area of the buildings is 17,857 m^{2} (192,210 sq ft). An open-air parking lot for 50 cars is available. The facility received a certificate in the Golden category of the Leadership in Energy and Environmental Design (LEED) standard.

Three more football fields were built in addition to the initial four football fields. One field features hybrid grass ground, two fields have artificial turf ground and four are natural grass fields. All football fields have FIFA-standard soccer-specific stadium dimensions. The football fields are equipped with floodlights. Three football fields have 50-seat bleachers and football field #4 has a bleacher of 100-spectator capacity.

The facility was built in 14 months on a plot, which was endowed to TFF on March 29, 2013. The ceremony took place on April 9, 2013. The cost of the construction amounted to ₺ 60 million. Spor Toto Organization contributed to the investment with ₺ 16 million.

The facility hosts training, international friendly and official matches of national football, futsal, and amputee football teams of both gender and all age groups. 2017 European Amputee Football Championship matches, with the exception of the final match, were played at the facility.

2022 Amputee Football World Cup matches were also played at the facility, exceptions included semi-final and final matches.
