= 2008 European Amputee Football Championship =

Tournament details
- Host country: Turkey
- City: Antalia
- Dates: 2–6 December
- Teams: 5
- Venue: 1

Final positions
- Champions: Russia (2nd title)
- Runners-up: Turkey
- Third place: Great Britain
- Fourth place: Ukraine

Tournament statistics
- Matches played: 10
- Goals scored: 41 (4.1 per match)

The 2008 European Amputee Football Championship was the 3rd edition of the international competition of european amputee football national men's teams. It was organized by the World Amputee Football Federation (WAFF), and was held in Antalia, Turkey between 2 and 6 December 2008.

Russia won the title for the second time in the round-robin tournament. Turkey became silver, and Great Britain became bronze medalists.

== Participating nations ==
Following five nations competed in the round-robin tournament.

- France
- Great Britain
- Russia
- Turkey
- Ukraine

== Round-robin tournament ==
Team	Pld	W	D	L	GF	GA	GD	P
Russia	4	4	0	0	12	1	+11	12
Turkey	4	2	1	1	7	5	+2	7
Great Britain	4	2	1	1	7	7	0	7
Ukraine	4	1	0	3	10	9	+1	3
France	4	0	0	4	5	19	−14	0

2 December 2008
14:00 GMT+3	Turkey	(Turkey)	3 – 1	(France)	France
15:00 GMT+3	Russia	(Russia)	2 – 0	(Ukraine)	Ukraine
3 December 2008
14:00 GMT+3	Great Britain	(United Kingdom)	0 – 2	(Russia)	Russia
15:00 GMT+3	Ukraine	(Ukraine)	7 – 1	(France)	France
4 December 2008
14:00 GMT+3	Ukraine	(Ukraine)	1 – 3	(Turkey)	Turkey
15:00 GMT+3	Great Britain	(United Kingdom)	3 – 2	(France)	France
5 December 2008
14:00 GMT+3	Russia	(Russia)	6 – 1	(France)	France
15:00 GMT+3	Turkey	(Turkey)	1 – 1	(United Kingdom)	Great Britain
6 December 2008
13:00 GMT+3	Ukraine	(Ukraine)	2 – 3	(United Kingdom)	Great Britain
14:00 GMT+3	Turkey	(Turkey)	0 – 2	(Russia)	Russia

== Rankings ==
Rank	Team
1	Russia
2	Turkey
3	Great Britain
4	Ukraine
5	France

2008 European Amputee Football Championship
(Russia)
Russia
Second title
