= 1999 European Amputee Football Championship =

Tournament details
- Host country: Ukraine
- City: Kyiv
- Dates: 5–9 August
- Teams: 8
- Venue: 1

Final positions
- Champions: Brazil (1st title)
- Runners-up: Russia
- Third place: Ukraine
- Fourth place: England

Tournament statistics
- Matches played: 18
- Goals scored: 125 (6.94 per match)
- Best young player: (Uzbekistan) Azziz

The 1999 European Amputee Football Championship was the 1st edition of the international competition of european amputee football national men's teams. It was organized by the International Amputee Football Federation (IAFF), had the "open" status, and was held in Kyiv, Ukraine between 5 and 9 August 1999.

Brazil national amputee football team won the title for the first time, defeating Russia in the final. Ukraine became bronze medalist before England. All matches were played at Spartak Stadium, Kyiv.

== Participating nations ==
Following eight nations competed in two groups. The first two ranking teams (green) in each group qualified for the knockout stage of semifinals.

- Brazil
- England
- Georgia
- Moldova
- Russia
- Ukraine
- United States
- Uzbekistan

== Preliminary round ==
=== Group A ===
Team	Pld	W	D	L	GF	GA	GD	P
Russia	3	2	1	0	27	0	+27	7
Brazil	3	2	1	0	18	0	+18	7
(Georgia (country)) Georgia	3	1	0	2	5	16	−11	3
Moldova	3	0	0	3	0	34	−34	0

5 August 1999
Brazil	(Brazil)	5 – 0	(Georgia (country))	Georgia	Spartak Stadium
Russia	(Russia)	16 – 0	(Moldova)	Moldova	Spartak Stadium
6 August 1999
Russia	(Russia)	0 – 0	(Brazil)	Brazil	Spartak Stadium
Georgia	(Georgia (country))	5 – 0	(Moldova)	Moldova	Spartak Stadium
7 August 1999
Georgia	(Georgia (country))	0 – 11	(Russia)	Russia	Spartak Stadium
Moldova	(Moldova)	0 – 13	(Brazil)	Brazil	Spartak Stadium

=== Group B ===
Team	Pld	W	D	L	GF	GA	GD	P
Ukraine	3	2	1	0	20	3	+17	7
England	3	2	0	1	9	5	+4	6
Uzbekistan	3	1	1	1	17	5	+12	4
United States	3	0	0	3	1	34	−33	0

5 August 1999
Ukraine	(Ukraine)	2 – 2	(Uzbekistan)	Uzbekistan	Spartak Stadium
England	(England)	6 – 0	(United States)	United States	Spartak Stadium
6 August 1999
England	(England)	2 – 0	(Uzbekistan)	Uzbekistan	Spartak Stadium
Ukraine	(Ukraine)	13 – 0	(United States)	United States	Spartak Stadium
7 August 1999
Uzbekistan	(Uzbekistan)	15 – 1	(United States)	United States	Spartak Stadium
Ukraine	(Ukraine)	5 – 1	(England)	England	Spartak Stadium

== Knockout stage ==
Semi-finals
8 August 1999
Russia	5
England	1
8 August 1999
Ukraine	0
Brazil	3

Final
9 August 1999
Russia	0
Brazil	1
Third place
9 August 1999
England	1
Ukraine	2

=== Semi-finals ===
8 August 1999
Russia	(Russia)	5 – 1	(England)	England	Spartak Stadium
Ukraine	(Ukraine)	0 – 3	(Brazil)	Brazil	Spartak Stadium

=== 7th place match ===
9 August 1999
Moldova	(Moldova)	0 – 6	(United States)	United States	Spartak Stadium

=== 5th place match ===
9 August 1999
Georgia	(Georgia (country))	2 – 7	(Uzbekistan)	Uzbekistan	Spartak Stadium

=== Bronze medal match ===
9 August 1999
England	(England)	1 – 2	(Ukraine)	Ukraine	Spartak Stadium

=== Gold medal match ===
9 August 1999
Russia	(Russia)	0 – 1	(Brazil)	Brazil	Spartak Stadium

== Rankings ==
Rank	Team
1	Brazil
2	Russia
3	Ukraine
4	England
5	Uzbekistan
6	Georgia
7	United States
8	Moldova

1999 European Amputee Football Championship
(Brazil)
Brazil
First title
