= Garbarnia Stadium =

Football stadium in Kraków, Poland

Coordinates: 50.03817°N 19.93479°E

- Stadion RKS Garbarnia
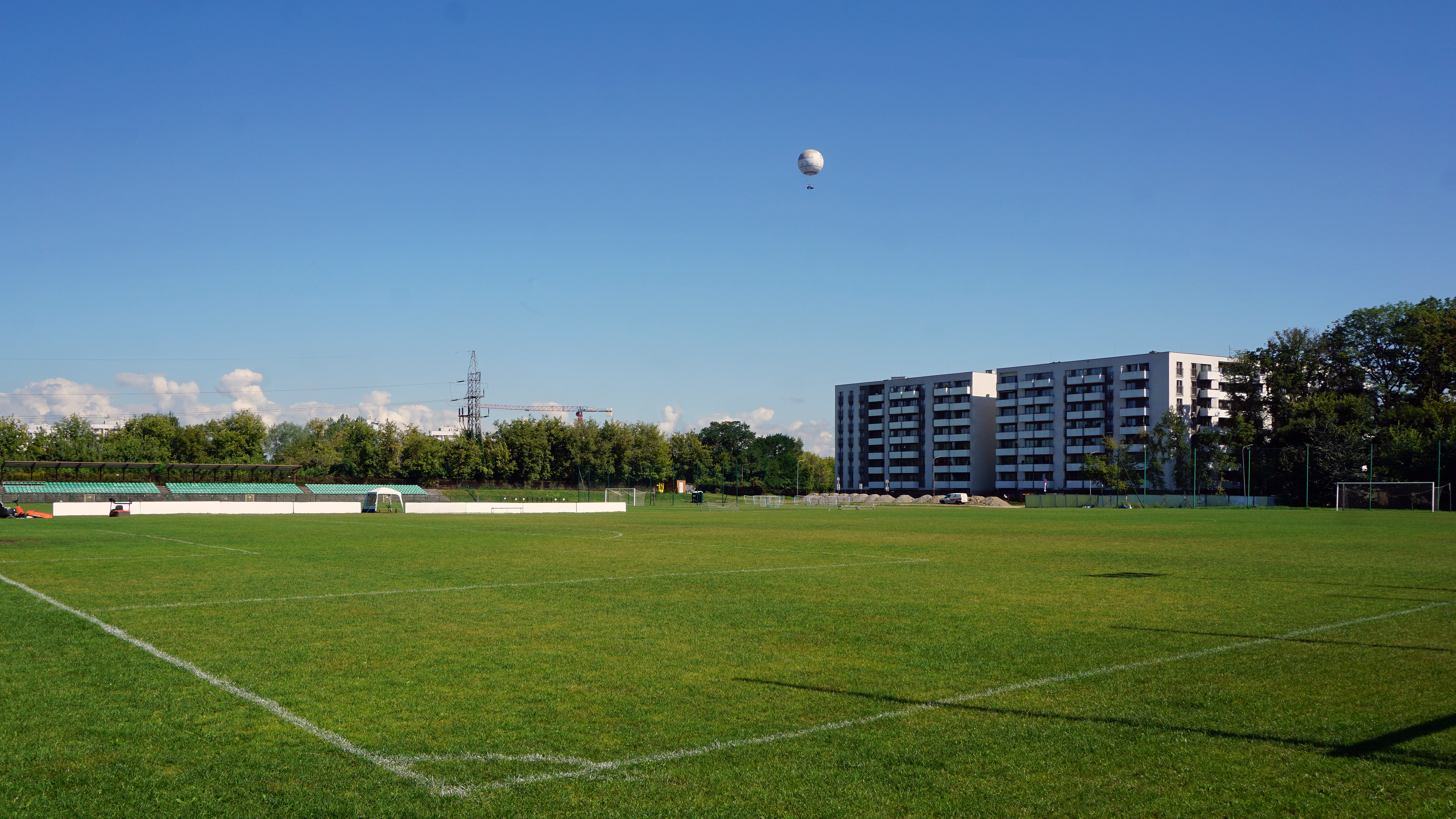
- Interactive map of Garbarnia Stadium
- Address: 23 Rydlówka Street; Kraków; Poland
- Location: Podgórze
- Capacity: 2,100 (953 seated)
- Surface: Grass

Construction
- Opened: 1990

Tenant
- Garbarnia Kraków

Website
- garbarnia.krakow.pl/stadion

Stadion RKS Garbarnia is a football stadium in Kraków, Poland.

Opened in 1990, it features two grass pitches and an artificial turf ground. It has capacity 2,100 places, including 953 seats.

All teams except Poland national amputee football team played their matches at the 2021 European Amputee Football Championship in this stadium.
