= 2012 Amputee Football World Cup =

Tournament details
- Host country: Russia
- City: Kaliningrad
- Dates: 7–14 October (8 days)
- Teams: 12
- Venue: 2

Final positions
- Champions: Uzbekistan (5th title)
- Runners-up: Russia
- Third place: Turkey
- Fourth place: Argentina

Tournament statistics
- Matches played: 38
- Goals scored: 166 (4.37 per match)

The 2012 Amputee Football World Cup was the 16th edition of the biennial international competition of amputee football national men's teams. It was organized by the World Amputee Football Federation (WAFF), and was held in Kaliningrad, Russia between 7 and 14 October 2012. The previous event took place in Argentina in 2010. Mexico was selected by majority vote on the WAFF 2012 Congress to host the next World Cup in 2014.

The competition was originally planned to be held in Japan, but the venue was changed due to the April 2011 Fukushima earthquake.

Uzbekistan won the title for the three consecutive time, defeating the three-time champions Russia in the final. Turkey became bronze medalist before Argentina.

== Participating nations ==
The original line-up of the competition changed as France and Brazil withdrew, and in their places Poland and Ukraine joined the 2012 World Cup.

Following twelve nations, including Uzbekistan as the defending world champion, competed in two groups.The first two ranking teams in each group qualified for the semi-finals.

- Argentina
- El Salvador
- Ghana
- (United Kingdom) Great Britain
- Iran
- Japan
- Liberia
- Poland
- Russia
- Turkey
- Ukraine
- Uzbekistan

== Preliminary round ==
=== Group A ===
| Team | Pld | W | D | L | GF | GA | GD | P |
|---|---|---|---|---|---|---|---|---|
| Russia | 5 | 5 | 0 | 0 | 16 | 3 | +13 | 15 |
| Argentina | 5 | 2 | 2 | 1 | 9 | 12 | -3 | 8 |
| Ghana | 5 | 2 | 1 | 2 | 9 | 7 | +2 | 7 |
| Iran | 5 | 1 | 3 | 1 | 7 | 7 | 0 | 6 |
| El Salvador | 5 | 1 | 2 | 2 | 10 | 11 | -1 | 5 |
| Poland | 5 | 0 | 0 | 5 | 5 | 16 | -11 | 0 |

7 October 2012
| 11:00 am | Argentina | (Argentina) | 0 - 5 | (Russia) | Russia |
| 12:00 pm | Poland | (Poland) | 0 - 2 | (Ghana) | Ghana |
| 1:00 pm | Iran | (Iran) | 0 - 0 | (El Salvador) | El Salvador |
8 October 2012
| 10:00 am | Iran | (Iran) | 0 - 2 | (Russia) | Russia |
| 11:00 am | Poland | (Poland) | 1 - 2 | (Argentina) | Argentina |
| 12:00 pm | El Salvador | (El Salvador) | 1 - 3 | (Ghana) | Ghana |
9 October 2012
| 10:00 am | Ghana | (Ghana) | 1 - 2 | (Russia) | Russia |
| 11:00 am | El Salvador | (El Salvador) | 5 - 3 | (Poland) | Poland |
| 12:00 pm | Argentina | (Argentina) | 2 - 2 | (Iran) | Iran |
10 October 2012
| 10:00 am | Russia | (Russia) | 5 - 1 | (Poland) | Poland |
| 11:00 am | Ghana | (Ghana) | 2 - 2 | (Iran) | Iran |
| 12:00 pm | El Salvador | (El Salvador) | 3 - 3 | (Argentina) | Argentina |
11 October 2012
| 10:00 am | Russia | (Russia) | 2 - 1 | (El Salvador) | El Salvador |
| 11:00 am | Argentina | (Argentina) | 2 - 1 | (Ghana) | Ghana |
| 12:00 pm | Poland | (Poland) | 1 - 3 | (Iran) | Iran |

=== Group B ===
| Team | Pld | W | D | L | GF | GA | GD | P |
|---|---|---|---|---|---|---|---|---|
| Uzbekistan | 5 | 5 | 0 | 0 | 29 | 5 | +24 | 15 |
| Turkey | 5 | 3 | 1 | 1 | 22 | 10 | +12 | 10 |
| (United Kingdom) Great Britain | 5 | 2 | 2 | 1 | 16 | 7 | +9 | 8 |
| Ukraine | 5 | 2 | 1 | 2 | 8 | 9 | -1 | 7 |
| Liberia | 5 | 0 | 1 | 4 | 7 | 23 | -16 | 1 |
| Japan | 5 | 0 | 1 | 4 | 5 | 33 | -28 | 1 |

7 October 2012
| 11:30 am | Japan | (Japan) | 1 - 2 | (Ukraine) | Ukraine |
| 12:30 pm | Uzbekistan | (Uzbekistan) | 6 - 1 | (Turkey) | Turkey |
| 2:30 pm | Liberia | (Liberia) | 0 - 4 | (United Kingdom) | Great Britain |
8 October 2012
| 10:30 am | Great Britain | (United Kingdom) | 1 - 1 | (Ukraine) | Ukraine |
| 11:30 am | Liberia | (Liberia) | 1 - 3 | (Turkey) | Turkey |
| 12:30 pm | Japan | (Japan) | 0 - 7 | (Uzbekistan) | Uzbekistan |
9 October 2012
| 10:30 am | Uzbekistan | (Uzbekistan) | 8 - 2 | (Liberia) | Liberia |
| 11:30 am | Great Britain | (United Kingdom) | 7 - 0 | (Japan) | Japan |
| 12:30 pm | Ukraine | (Ukraine) | 1 - 3 | (Turkey) | Turkey |
10 October 2012
| 10:30 am | Turkey | (Turkey) | 13 - 0 | (Japan) | Japan |
| 11:30 am | Uzbekistan | (Uzbekistan) | 4 - 2 | (United Kingdom) | Great Britain |
| 12:30 pm | Ukraine | (Ukraine) | 4 - 0 | (Liberia) | Liberia |
11 October 2012
| 10:30 am | Turkey | (Turkey) | 2 - 2 | (United Kingdom) | Great Britain |
| 11:30 am | Ukraine | (Ukraine) | 0 - 4 | (Uzbekistan) | Uzbekistan |
| 12:30 pm | Japan | (Japan) | 4 - 4 | (Liberia) | Liberia |

== Placement matches ==
11th place
13 October 2012
| | Poland | (Poland) | 2 - 2 (pen. 4 - 3) | (Japan) | Japan |
9th place
13 October 2012
| | El Salvador | (El Salvador) | 3 - 2 | (Liberia) | Liberia |
7th place
13 October 2012
| | Iran | (Iran) | 1 - 0 | (Ukraine) | Ukraine |
5th place
13 October 2012
| | Ghana | (Ghana) | 0 - 2 | (United Kingdom) | Great Britain |

== Knockout stage ==
Semi-finals
13 October 2012
Russia | 3
Turkey | 0
13 October 2012
Uzbekistan | 4
Argentina | 0

Final
14 October 2012
Russia | 0
Uzbekistan | 1
Third place
14 October 2012
Turkey | 3
Argentina | 0

Semifinals
13 October 2012
| | Russia | (Russia) | 3 - 0 | (Turkey) | Turkey |
| | Uzbekistan | (Uzbekistan) | 4 - 0 | (Argentina) | Argentina |
Bronze medal match
14 October 2012
| | Turkey | (Turkey) | 3 - 0 | (Argentina) | Argentina |
Gold medal match
14 October 2012
| | Russia | (Russia) | 0 - 1 | (Uzbekistan) | Uzbekistan |

== Rankings ==
| Rank | Team |
|---|---|
| 1 | Uzbekistan |
| 2 | Russia |
| 3 | Turkey |
| 4 | Argentina |
| 5 | (United Kingdom) Great Britain |
| 6 | Ghana |
| 7 | Iran |
| 8 | Ukraine |
| 9 | El Salvador |
| 10 | Liberia |
| 11 | Poland |
| 12 | Japan |

2012 Amputee Football World Cup

Uzbekistan
5th title
