= Turkey national amputee football team =

Turkey national amputee football team is the men's national team of Turkey in amputee football. It is governed by the Turkish Disabled Sports Federation (Turkish: Türkiye Bedensel Engelliler Spor Federasyonu, TBESF), and takes part in international amputee football competitions.

== Achievements ==
Year	Date	Venue	Position	Notes
World Championship
2005	Aug 11–21	BRA Rio de Janeiro	5th	
2007	Nov 11–21	TUR Antalya	3rd place, bronze medalist(s)	
World Cup
2010	Oct 16–24	ARG Crespo, Entre Ríos	3rd place, bronze medalist(s)	
2012	Oct 7–14	RUS Kaliningrad	3rd place, bronze medalist(s)	
2014	Nov 30 – Dec 8	MEX Culiacán	3rd place, bronze medalist(s)	
2018	Oct 27 – Nov 4	MEX San Juan de los Lagos	2nd place, silver medalist(s)	
2022	Sep 30 – Oct 9	TUR Istanbul	1st place, gold medalist(s)	
European Championship
2004	May 27 – Jun 2	UKR Kyiv	2nd place, silver medalist(s)	
2008	Dec 1–6	TUR Antalya	2nd place, silver medalist(s)	
2017	Oct 1–10	TUR Istanbul	1st place, gold medalist(s)	
2021	Sep 12–19	POL Kraków	1st place, gold medalist(s)	
2024	May 31–June 9	FRA Haute-Savoie	1st place, gold medalist(s)	

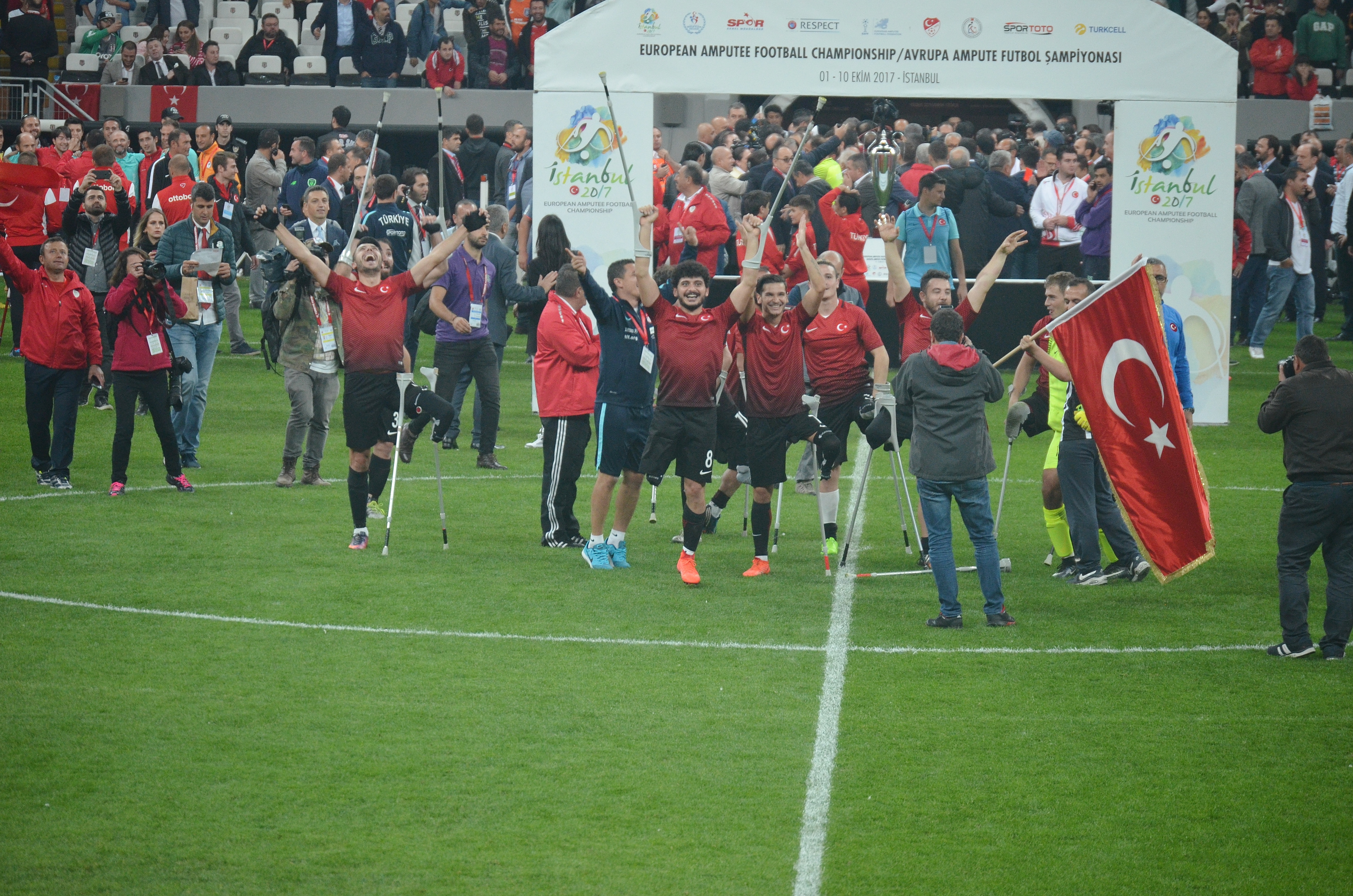
Turkey national amputee football team members enjoying after winning the 2017 European Amputee Football Championship final match Turkey vs England at Vodafone Park in Istanbul, Turkey.

== Current squad ==
As of 9 October 2022

Coach: (Turkey) Osman Çakmak

No.	Pos.	Player	Date of birth (age)	Caps	Goals	Club
1	GK	Mert Yıldız				(Turkish Football Federation) Şahinbey BG
26	GK	Bülent Çetin				(Turkish Football Federation) Etimesgut BS
35	GK	Erdi Arslan				(Turkish Football Federation) Altay SK
4	DF	Muhittin Kurt				(Turkish Football Federation) Etimesgut BS
5	DF	Okan Şahiner				(Turkish Football Federation) TSK Rehab Merkezi Eng
22	DF	Fuat Taştan				(Turkish Football Federation) Şahinbey BG
57	DF	İsmail Korkmaz				(Turkish Football Federation) Pendik Eng Spor
6	MF	Şeyhmus Erdinç				(Turkish Football Federation) Etimesgut BS
7	MF	Serkan Dereli				(Turkish Football Federation) Pendik Eng SK
9	MF	Fatih Şentürk				(Turkish Football Federation) Şahinbey BG
10	MF	Rahmi Özcan				(Turkish Football Federation) Şahinbey BG
17	MF	Savaş Kaya				(Turkish Football Federation) TSK Rehab Merkezi Eng
8	FW	Kemal Güleş				(Turkish Football Federation) Etimesgut BS
11	FW	Ömer Güleryüz				(Turkish Football Federation) Etimesgut BS
