= European Amputee Football Federation =

European Amputee Football Federation (EAFF)
- Abbreviation: EAFF
- Formation: February 28, 2015; 11 years ago
- Region served: Europe
- Members: 19
- President: Mateusz Widłak (Poland)
- Secretary General: Simon Baker (Ireland)
- Main organ: EAFF Congress
- Parent organization: UEFA

The European Amputee Football Federation (EAFF) is the administrative body for amputee football in Europe representing the national amputee football associations.

== History ==
The European Amputee Football Federation was established by ten countries in its inaugural congress held in Dublin, Ireland in February 2015. The initial member countries were England, France, Germany, Italy, Poland, Republic of Ireland, Russia, Spain, Turkey and Ukraine. Belgium, Georgia and the Netherlands joined the federation later. Mateusz Widłak from Poland was elected as its first president, and Simon Baker from Ireland the Secretary General. The same year, the EAFF gained the support of the Union of European Football Associations (UEFA) within its portfolio "Football for All Abilities".

== Program and projects ==
The EAFF runs a nation competition as the European Amputee Football Championship. The first edition of the championship was held in Istanbul, Turkey in October 2017.

Backed by the UEFA, the EAFF has set up projects including amputee and limb impaired children's football and conferences for coaches and referees. It is envisioned that the amputee football will be recognized as part of the Paralympic Games.

The second European championship was held in Krakow in September 2021.

Amputee football EAFF Nations League first edition took place in 2023.

Amputee football EAFF Europa League first edition took place in 2026.
