= 2014 Amputee Football World Cup =

Tournament details
- Host country: Mexico
- City: Culiacán
- Dates: 30 November–7 December
- Teams: 20
- Venue: 2

Final positions
- Champions: Russia (5th title)
- Runners-up: Angola
- Third place: Turkey
- Fourth place: Poland

Tournament statistics
- Top scorer: (Russia) Igor Zihlin
- Best player: (Russia) Igor Zihlin

The 2014 Amputee Football World Cup was the 17th edition of the biennial international competition of amputee football national men's teams. It was organized by the World Amputee Football Federation (WAFF), and was held in Culiacán, Mexico between November 30–December 7, 2014.

Russia won the title for the fourth time, defeating Angola in the final. Turkey became a bronze medalist before Poland.

The tournament included the first woman to participate in World Cup play since 1986.

== Participating nations ==
Following 20 nations, including Uzbekistan as the defending world champion, competed in six groups. Georgia did not show, Iran withdrew and Ghana arrived late. The top two teams from each group plus the best four 3rd-ranked teams qualified for the round of 16. Remaining teams, four in total, played "Copa Culiacán" to determine the places 17-20.

- Angola
- Argentina
- Brazil
- Colombia
- El Salvador
- England
- France
- Germany
- Haiti
- Ireland
- Italy
- Japan
- Kenya
- Mexico
- Poland
- Russia
- Turkey
- Ukraine
- United States
- Uzbekistan

== Preliminary round ==
=== Group A ===
| Team | Pld | W | D | L | GF | GA | GD | P |
|---|---|---|---|---|---|---|---|---|
| Uzbekistan | 3 | 3 | 0 | 0 | 19 | 1 | +18 | 9 |
| Brazil | 3 | 2 | 0 | 1 | 4 | 3 | +1 | 6 |
| Ukraine | 3 | 1 | 0 | 2 | 2 | 12 | -10 | 3 |
| Ireland | 3 | 0 | 0 | 3 | 1 | 10 | -9 | 0 |

30 November 2014
| 08:30 GMT-7 | Uzbekistan | (Uzbekistan) | 10 - 0 | (Ukraine) | Ukraine | University Stadium |
| 09:30 GMT-7 | Brazil | (Brazil) | 2 - 0 | (Republic of Ireland) | Ireland | University Stadium |
1 December 2014
| 09:30 GMT-7 | Uzbekistan | (Uzbekistan) | 6 - 1 | (Republic of Ireland) | Ireland | Banorte Stadium |
| 10:30 GMT-7 | Brazil | (Brazil) | 2 - 0 | (Ukraine) | Ukraine | Banorte Stadium |
2 December 2014
| 08:00 GMT-7 | Uzbekistan | (Uzbekistan) | 3 - 0 | (Brazil) | Brazil | University Stadium |
| 08:00 GMT-7 | Ireland | (Republic of Ireland) | 0 - 2 | (Ukraine) | Ukraine | University Stadium |

=== Group B ===
| Team | Pld | W | D | L | GF | GA | GD | P |
|---|---|---|---|---|---|---|---|---|
| Italy | 2 | 1 | 0 | 1 | 2 | 1 | +1 | 3 |
| Poland | 2 | 1 | 0 | 1 | 3 | 3 | 0 | 3 |
| Mexico | 2 | 1 | 0 | 1 | 3 | 4 | -1 | 3 |

30 November 2014
| 17:30 GMT-7 | Mexico | (Mexico) | 0 - 2 | (Italy) | Italy | University Stadium |
1 December 2014
| 09:00 GMT-7 | Poland | (Poland) | 1 - 0 | (Italy) | Italy | Banorte Stadium |
2 December 2014
| 19:00 GMT-7 | Mexico | (Mexico) | 3 - 2 | (Poland) | Poland | University Stadium |

=== Group C ===
| Team | Pld | W | D | L | GF | GA | GD | P |
|---|---|---|---|---|---|---|---|---|
| Russia | 3 | 3 | 0 | 0 | 17 | 2 | +15 | 9 |
| Haiti | 3 | 2 | 0 | 1 | 5 | 6 | -1 | 6 |
| Germany | 3 | 1 | 0 | 2 | 3 | 11 | -8 | 3 |
| Kenya | 3 | 0 | 0 | 3 | 3 | 9 | -6 | 0 |

30 November 2014
| 10:00 GMT-7 | Russia | (Russia) | 4 - 1 | (Kenya) | Kenya | University Stadium |
| 11:00 GMT-7 | Haiti | (Haiti) | 2 - 0 | (Germany) | Germany | University Stadium |
1 December 2014
| 11:00 GMT-7 | Germany | (Germany) | 0 - 7 | (Russia) | Russia | Banorte Stadium |
| 13:00 GMT-7 | Haiti | (Haiti) | 2 - 0 | (Kenya) | Kenya | University Stadium |
2 December 2014
| 08:30 GMT-7 | Russia | (Russia) | 6 - 1 | (Haiti) | Haiti | Banorte Stadium |
| 08:30 GMT-7 | Germany | (Germany) | 3 - 2 | (Kenya) | Kenya | University Stadium |

=== Group D ===
| Team | Pld | W | D | L | GF | GA | GD | P |
|---|---|---|---|---|---|---|---|---|
| Argentina | 3 | 3 | 0 | 0 | 8 | 0 | +8 | 9 |
| El Salvador | 3 | 2 | 0 | 1 | 10 | 7 | +3 | 6 |
| France | 3 | 1 | 0 | 2 | 3 | 8 | -5 | 3 |
| Colombia | 3 | 0 | 0 | 3 | 4 | 10 | -6 | 0 |

30 November 2014
| 09:00 GMT-7 | France | (France) | 2 - 1 | (Colombia) | Colombia | Banorte Stadium |
| 11:30 GMT-7 | Argentina | (Argentina) | 3 - 0 | (El Salvador) | El Salvador | University Stadium |
1 December 2014
| 13:30 GMT-7 | Argentina | (Argentina) | 3 - 0 | (Colombia) | Colombia | University Stadium |
| 14:30 GMT-7 | El Salvador | (El Salvador) | 5 - 1 | (France) | France | University Stadium |
2 December 2014
| 09:30 GMT-7 | Argentina | (Argentina) | 2 - 0 | (France) | France | University Stadium |
| 11:00 GMT-7 | El Salvador | (El Salvador) | 5 - 3 | (Colombia) | Colombia | Banorte Stadium |

=== Group E ===
| Team | Pld | W | D | L | GF | GA | GD | P |
|---|---|---|---|---|---|---|---|---|
| Japan | 2 | 2 | 0 | 0 | 4 | 0 | +4 | 6 |
| Turkey | 2 | 1 | 0 | 1 | 2 | 3 | -1 | 3 |
| United States | 2 | 0 | 0 | 2 | 0 | 3 | -3 | 0 |

30 November 2014
| 11:00 GMT-7 | United States | (United States) | 0 - 1 | (Japan) | Japan | Banorte Stadium |
1 December 2014
| 15:00 GMT-7 | Turkey | (Turkey) | 0 - 3 | (Japan) | Japan | University Stadium |
2 December 2014
| 10:30 GMT-7 | Turkey | (Turkey) | 2 - 0 | (United States) | United States | Banorte Stadium |

=== Group F ===
| Team | Pld | W | D | L | GF | GA | GD | P |
|---|---|---|---|---|---|---|---|---|
| England | 1 | 1 | 0 | 0 | 3 | 1 | +2 | 3 |
| Angola | 1 | 0 | 0 | 1 | 1 | 3 | -2 | 0 |

30 November 2014
| 11:30 GMT-7 | England | (England) | 3 - 1 | (Angola) | Angola | Banorte Stadium |

=== Ranking of third-placed teams ===
| Team | Gr | Pld | W | D | L | GF | GA | GD | P |
|---|---|---|---|---|---|---|---|---|---|
| Mexico | B | 2 | 1 | 0 | 1 | 3 | 4 | -1 | 3 |
| United States | E | 2 | 0 | 0 | 2 | 0 | 3 | -3 | 0 |
| France | D | 2 | 0 | 0 | 2 | 1 | 7 | -6 | 0 |
| Germany | C | 2 | 0 | 0 | 2 | 0 | 9 | -9 | 0 |
| Ukraine | A | 2 | 0 | 0 | 2 | 0 | 12 | -12 | 0 |

== Copa Culiacán ==
| Team | Pld | W | D | L | GF | GA | GD | P |
|---|---|---|---|---|---|---|---|---|
| Ukraine | 3 | 2 | 1 | 0 | 4 | 0 | +4 | 7 |
| Ireland | 3 | 1 | 1 | 1 | 5 | 6 | -1 | 4 |
| Kenya | 3 | 1 | 0 | 2 | 5 | 5 | 0 | 3 |
| Colombia | 3 | 0 | 2 | 1 | 1 | 4 | -3 | 2 |

4 December 2014
| 08:00 GMT-7 | Ireland | (Republic of Ireland) | 4 - 2 | (Kenya) | Kenya |
| | Ukraine | (Ukraine) | 0 - 0 | (Colombia) | Colombia |
5 December 2014
| | Kenya | (Kenya) | 0 - 1 | (Ukraine) | Ukraine |
| 13:30 GMT-7 | Ireland | (Republic of Ireland) | 1 - 1 | (Colombia) | Colombia |
6 December 2014
| 09:00 GMT-7 | Ireland | (Republic of Ireland) | 0 - 3 | (Ukraine) | Ukraine |
| | Kenya | (Kenya) | 3 - 0 | (Colombia) | Colombia |

== Knockout stage ==
Round of 16
B1 | Italy | 1(3)
C2 | Haiti | 1(4)
F1 | England | 0
E2 | Turkey | 1
C1 | Russia | 10
D2 | El Salvador | 1
A2 | Brazil | 10
C3 | Germany | 0
B2 | Poland | 3
E3 | United States | 1
D1 | Argentina | 3
B3 | Mexico | 0
A1 | Uzbekistan | 3
D3 | France | 0
E1 | Japan | 0
F2 | Angola | 1

Quarterfinals
Haiti | 0
Turkey | 3
Russia | 4
Brazil | 0
Poland | 2
Argentina | 1
Uzbekistan | 0
Angola | 1

Semi-finals
Turkey | 0
Russia | 1
Poland | 0
Angola | 1

Final
Russia | 3
Angola | 1
3rd place
Turkey | 1
Poland | 0

=== Round of 16 ===
4 December 2014
| | Italy | (Italy) | 1 - 1 (3 - 4) | (Haiti) | Haiti |
| | England | (England) | 0 - 1 | (Turkey) | Turkey |
| | Russia | (Russia) | 10 - 1 | (El Salvador) | El Salvador |
| | Brazil | (Brazil) | 10 - 0 | (Germany) | Germany |
| | Poland | (Poland) | 3 - 1 | (United States) | United States |
| | Argentina | (Argentina) | 3 - 0 | (Mexico) | Mexico |
| | Uzbekistan | (Uzbekistan) | 3 - 0 | (France) | France |
| | Japan | (Japan) | 0 - 1 | (Angola) | Angola |

Positions 9-16

Position 9-16
B1 | Italy | 0
F1 | England | 7
D2 | El Salvador | W
C3 | Germany | L
E3 | United States | W
B3 | Mexico | L
D3 | France | L
E1 | Japan | W

Position 9-12
F1 | England | 4
C3 | El Salvador | 1
E3 | United States | L
E1 | Japan | W

9th place
F1 | England | W
E1 | Japan | L
11th place
C3 | El Salvador | W
E3 | United States | L

Positions 13-16
B1 | Italy | W
C3 | Germany | L
B3 | Mexico | W
D3 | France | L

13th place
B1 | Italy | W
B3 | Mexico | L
15th place
C3 | Germany | L
D3 | France | W

5 December 2014
| | Italy | (Italy) | 0 - 7 | (England) | England |
| | El Salvador | (El Salvador) | W - L | (Germany) | Germany |
| | United States | (United States) | W - L | (Mexico) | Mexico |
| | France | (France) | L - W | (Japan) | Japan |

Positions 13-16

6 December 2014
| | Italy | (Italy) | W - L | (Germany) | Germany |
| | Mexico | (Mexico) | W - L | (France) | France |

15th place

7 December 2014
| | Germany | (Germany) | L - W | (France) | France |

13th place

7 December 2014
| | Italy | (Italy) | W - L | (Mexico) | Mexico |

Positions 9-12

11th place

9th place

=== Quarterfinals ===
5 December 2014
| | Haiti | (Haiti) | 0 - 3 | (Turkey) | Turkey |
| | Russia | (Russia) | 4 - 0 | (Brazil) | Brazil |
| | Poland | (Poland) | 2 - 1 | (Argentina) | Argentina |
| | Uzbekistan | (Uzbekistan) | 0 - 1 | (Angola) | Angola |

=== Semifinals ===
6 December 2014
| | Russia | (Russia) | 1 - 0 | (Turkey) | Turkey |
| | Angola | (Angola) | 1 - 0 | (Poland) | Poland |

=== Bronze medal match ===
7 December 2014
| | Turkey | (Turkey) | 1 - 0 | (Poland) | Poland |

=== Gold medal match ===
7 December 2014
| | Russia | (Russia) | 3 - 1 | (Angola) | Angola |

== Rankings ==
| Rank | Team |
|---|---|
| 1 | Russia |
| 2 | Angola |
| 3 | Turkey |
| 4 | Poland |
| 5 | Argentina |
| 6 | Uzbekistan |
| 7 | Haiti |
| 8 | Brazil |
| 9 | Italy |
| 10 | England |
| 11 | Japan |
| 12 | United States |
| 13 | Mexico |
| 14 | France |
| 15 | El Salvador |
| 16 | Germany |
| 17 | Ukraine |
| 18 | Ireland |
| 19 | Kenya |
| 20 | Colombia |

2014 Amputee Football World Cup

Russia
Fifth title
