= European Amputee Football Championship =

International football competition

The European Amputee Football Championship is a quadrennial European tournament in the association football sport for amputee people. It was first held in Kyiv, Ukraine in 1999, organized by the WAFF and had "open" format. Under EAFF aegis it was first held in Istanbul, Turkey in 2017.

== Results by year ==
Edition	Year	Host	Dates	Nations played	Gold	Final score	Silver	Bronze	Bronze match score	4th place	Ref.
IAFF tournaments
1	1999	Ukraine, Kyiv	Aug 5–9	8	Brazil	1–0	Russia	Ukraine	2–1	England	
WAFF tournaments
2	2006	Russia, Volgograd	Sep 24–30	8	Russia	4–1	(United Kingdom) Great Britain	Uzbekistan	1–0	Ukraine	
3	2008	Turkey, Antalia	Dec 2–6	5	Russia	2–0	Turkey	Great Britain	3–2	Ukraine	
EAFF tournaments
4	2017	Turkey, Istanbul	Oct 2–9	12	Turkey	2–1	England	Poland	3–1	Spain	
5	2021	Poland, Kraków	Sep 12–19	14	Turkey	6–0	Spain	Poland	1–0	Russia	
6	2024	France, Evian	Jun 1–8	16	Turkey	3–0	Spain	Poland	1–0	England	

== Medals summary ==
Rank	Nation	Gold	Silver	Bronze	Total
1	Turkey	3	1	0	4
2	Russia	2	1	0	3
3	Brazil	1	0	0	1
4	Spain	0	2	0	2
5	Great Britain	0	1	1	2
6	England	0	1	0	1
7	Poland	0	0	3	3
8	Ukraine	0	0	1	1
8	Uzbekistan	0	0	1	1
Totals (9 entries)		6	6	6	18

== See also ==
- Amputee football
- EAFF Nations League
- Amputee Football World Cup
