= 2018 Amputee Football World Cup =

Tournament details
- Host country: Mexico
- City: San Juan de los Lagos
- Dates: 27 October – 4 November
- Teams: 22
- Venue: 1

Final positions
- Champions: Angola (1st title)
- Runners-up: Turkey
- Third place: Brazil
- Fourth place: Mexico

Tournament statistics
- Matches played: 68
- Goals scored: 209 (3.07 per match)
- Top scorer: (Haiti) Ronaldo Richards
- Best player: (Angola) Celestino Elias Antonio

The 2018 Amputee Football World Cup was the 18th edition of the international competition of amputee football national men's teams. It was organized by the World Amputee Football Federation (WAFF), and was held in San Juan de los Lagos, Mexico between October 27 – November 4.

Angola won the title for the first time, defeating Turkey in the final. Brazil became a bronze medalist before Mexico. Haitian striker Ronaldo Richard was awarded the Golden Foot Award for the most goals scored during the 2018 World Cup.

== Participating nations ==
Following 22 nations, competed in six groups while two nations Liberia and Ghana, who also qualified to play in Mexico, withdrew before the start of the tournament after Liberia reportedly failed to secure their visas on time, and Ghana faced financial difficulties.

- Angola
- Argentina
- Brazil
- Colombia
- Costa Rica
- El Salvador
- England
- France
- Haiti
- Ireland
- Italy
- Japan
- Kenya
- Mexico
- Nigeria
- Poland
- Russia
- Spain
- Turkey
- Ukraine
- United States
- Uruguay

== Preliminary round ==
=== Group A ===
Team	Pld	W	D	L	GF	GA	GD	P
England	3	3	0	0	11	0	+11	9
Mexico	3	2	0	1	5	4	+1	6
Ireland	3	1	0	2	5	7	-2	3
Uruguay	3	0	0	3	1	11	-10	0

27 October 2018
	Mexico	(Mexico)	3 - 1	(Republic of Ireland)	Ireland
28 October 2018
	England	(England)	5 - 0	(Uruguay)	Uruguay
29 October 2018
	Mexico	(Mexico)	2 - 0	(Uruguay)	Uruguay
	England	(England)	3 - 0	(Republic of Ireland)	Ireland
30 October 2018
	Mexico	(Mexico)	0 - 3	(England)	England
	Ireland	(Republic of Ireland)	4 - 1	(Uruguay)	Uruguay

=== Group B ===
Team	Pld	W	D	L	GF	GA	GD	P
Italy	2	2	0	0	3	1	+2	6
France	2	0	1	1	2	3	-1	1
Argentina	2	0	1	1	1	2	-1	1

28 October 2018
	Argentina	(Argentina)	1 - 1	(France)	France
29 October 2018
	Italy	(Italy)	2 - 1	(France)	France
30 October 2018
	Argentina	(Argentina)	0 - 1	(Italy)	Italy

=== Group C ===
Team	Pld	W	Don't	L	GF	GA	GD	P
Colombia	3	2	0	1	5	2	+3	6
Japan	3	2	0	1	3	3	0	6
Poland	3	2	0	1	2	2	0	6
Costa Rica	3	0	0	3	1	4	-3	0

28 October 2018
	Poland	(Poland)	1 - 0	(Colombia)	Colombia
	Japan	(Japan)	1 - 0	(Costa Rica)	Costa Rica
29 October 2018
	Poland	(Poland)	1 - 0	(Costa Rica)	Costa Rica
	Japan	(Japan)	0 - 3	(Colombia)	Colombia
30 October 2018
	Poland	(Poland)	0 - 2	(Japan)	Japan
	Colombia	(Colombia)	2 - 1	(Costa Rica)	Costa Rica

=== Group D ===
Team	Pld	W	D	L	GF	GA	GD	P
Haiti	3	3	0	0	6	2	+4	9
Angola	3	2	0	1	6	2	+4	6
Spain	3	1	0	2	5	3	+2	3
Ukraine	3	0	0	3	1	11	-10	0

28 October 2018
	Angola	(Angola)	4 - 0	(Ukraine)	Ukraine
	Haiti	(Haiti)	2 - 0	(Spain)	Spain
29 October 2018
	Angola	(Angola)	1 - 0	(Spain)	Spain
	Haiti	(Haiti)	2 - 1	(Ukraine)	Ukraine
30 October 2018
	Angola	(Angola)	1 - 2	(Haiti)	Haiti
	Ukraine	(Ukraine)	0 - 5	(Spain)	Spain

=== Group E ===
Team	Pld	W	D	L	GF	GA	GD	P
Brazil	3	1	1	0	7	0	+7	7
Russia	3	2	1	0	5	0	+5	7
Nigeria	3	1	0	2	1	9	-8	3
El Salvador	3	0	0	3	0	4	-4	0

28 October 2018
	Russia	(Russia)	2 - 0	(El Salvador)	El Salvador
29 October 2018
	Brazil	(Brazil)	6 - 0	(Nigeria)	Nigeria
	Brazil	(Brazil)	1 - 0	(El Salvador)	El Salvador
30 October 2018
	Russia	(Russia)	3 - 0	(Nigeria)	Nigeria
	Russia	(Russia)	0 - 0	(Brazil)	Brazil
	El Salvador	(El Salvador)	0 - 1	(Nigeria)	Nigeria

=== Group F ===
Team	Pld	W	D	L	GF	GA	GD	P
Turkey	2	2	0	0	9	2	+7	6
Kenya	2	1	0	1	3	5	-2	3
United States	2	0	0	2	2	7	-5	0

28 October 2018
	Turkey	(Turkey)	4 - 1	(Kenya)	Kenya
29 October 2018
	Kenya	(Kenya)	2 - 1	(United States)	United States
30 October 2018
	Turkey	(Turkey)	5 - 1	(United States)	United States

=== Ranking of third-placed teams ===
Team	Gr	Pld	W	D	L	GF	GA	GD	P
Poland	C	2	1	0	1	1	2	-1	3
Argentina	B	2	0	1	1	1	2	-2	1
Spain	D	2	0	0	2	0	3	-3	0
Ireland	A	2	0	0	2	1	6	-5	0
United States	F	2	0	0	2	2	7	-5	0
Nigeria	E	2	0	0	2	0	9	-9	0

== Consolation round ==
=== Positions 20-22 ===
Team	Pld	W	D	L	GF	GA	GD	P
El Salvador	2	2	0	0	9	3	+6	6
Uruguay	2	1	0	1	5	8	-3	3
Ukraine	2	0	0	2	3	6	-3	0

31 October 2018
	El Salvador	(El Salvador)	3 - 1	(Ukraine)	Ukraine
1 November 2018
	Uruguay	(Uruguay)	3 - 2	(Ukraine)	Ukraine
2 November 2018
	El Salvador	(El Salvador)	6 - 2	(Uruguay)	Uruguay

=== Positions 17-19 ===
Team	Pld	W	D	L	GF	GA	GD	P
United States	2	2	0	0	4	2	+2	6
Costa Rica	2	0	1	1	2	3	-1	1
Nigeria	2	0	1	1	2	3	-1	1

31 October 2018
	United States	(United States)	2 - 1	(Costa Rica)	Costa Rica
1 November 2018
	Nigeria	(Nigeria)	1 - 1	(Costa Rica)	Costa Rica
2 November 2018
	United States	(United States)	2 - 1	(Nigeria)	Nigeria

== Knockout stage ==
Round of 16
A1	England	1
B3	Argentina	0
E1	Brazil	1(pen.)
B2	France	1(pen.)
D1	Haiti	1
C3	Poland	2
B1	Italy	0
D2	Angola	2
A2	Mexico	2
C2	Japan	0
C1	Colombia	2
D3	Spain	3
F1	Turkey	4
A3	(Republic of Ireland) Ireland	0
E2	Russia	4
F2	Kenya	1

Quarterfinals
A1	England	1
E1	Brazil	5
C3	Poland	3(2)
D2	Angola	3(3)
A2	Mexico	2
D3	Spain	0
F1	Turkey	5
E2	Russia	1

Semi-finals
E1	Brazil	1
D2	Angola	2
A2	Mexico	0
F1	Turkey	4

Final
D2	Angola	0(5)
F1	Turkey	0(4)
3rd place
E1	Brazil	0(5)
A2	Mexico	0(4)

=== Round of 16 ===
31 October 2018
	Russia	(Russia)	4 - 1	(Kenya)	Kenya
	England	(England)	1 - 0	(Argentina)	Argentina
	Turkey	(Turkey)	4 - 0	(Republic of Ireland)	Ireland
	Mexico	(Mexico)	2 - 0	(Japan)	Japan
	Haiti	(Haiti)	1 - 2	(Poland)	Poland
	Brazil	(Brazil)	1 - 1 (pen.)	(France)	France
	Italy	(Italy)	0 - 2	(Angola)	Angola
	Colombia	(Colombia)	2 - 3	(Spain)	Spain

Positions 9-16

Positions 9-16
B3	Argentina	2
B2	France	1
D1	Haiti	3
B1	Italy	1
C2	Japan	1
C1	Colombia	0
A3	(Republic of Ireland) Ireland	1(3)
F2	Kenya	1(5)

Positions 9-12
B3	Argentina	2
D1	Haiti	3
C2	Japan	2
F2	Kenya	1

9th place
D1	Haiti	2
C2	Japan	1
11th place
B3	Argentina	6
F2	Kenya	0

Positions 13-16
B2	France	0
B1	Italy	1
C1	Colombia	0
A3	(Republic of Ireland) Ireland	2

13th place
B1	Italy	1
A3	(Republic of Ireland) Ireland	4
15th place
B2	France	1(pen.)
C1	Colombia	1(pen.)

1 November 2018
	Argentina	(Argentina)	2 - 1	(France)	France
	Haiti	(Haiti)	3 - 1	(Italy)	Italy
	Japan	(Japan)	1 - 0	(Colombia)	Colombia
	Ireland	(Republic of Ireland)	1 - 1 (pen. 3 - 5)	(Kenya)	Kenya

Positions 13–16

2 November 2018
	France	(France)	0 - 1	(Italy)	Italy
	Colombia	(Colombia)	0 - 2	(Republic of Ireland)	Ireland

15th place

3 November 2018
	France	(France)	1 - 1 (pen.)	(Colombia)	Colombia

13th place

3 November 2018
	Italy	(Italy)	1 - 4	(Republic of Ireland)	Ireland

Positions 9–12

2 November 2018
	Argentina	(Argentina)	2 - 3	(Haiti)	Haiti
	Japan	(Japan)	2 - 1	(Kenya)	Kenya

11th place

3 November 2018
	Argentina	(Argentina)	6 - 0	(Kenya)	Kenya

9th place

3 November 2018
	Haiti	(Haiti)	2 - 1	(Japan)	Japan

=== Quarterfinals ===
1 November 2018
	England	(England)	1 - 5	(Brazil)	Brazil
	Poland	(Poland)	3 - 3 (pen. 2 - 3)	(Angola)	Angola
	Mexico	(Mexico)	2 - 0	(Spain)	Spain
	Turkey	(Turkey)	5 - 1	(Russia)	Russia

Positions 5–8

Positions 5-8
A1	England	2
C3	Poland	0
D3	Spain	0
E2	Russia	5

5th place
A1	England	1
E2	Russia	3
7th place
C3	Poland	1
D3	Spain	0

2 November 2018
	England	(England)	2 - 0	(Poland)	Poland
	Spain	(Spain)	0 - 5	(Russia)	Russia

7th place

3 November 2018
	Poland	(Poland)	1 - 0	(Spain)	Spain

5th place

3 November 2018
	England	(England)	1 - 3	(Russia)	Russia

=== Semifinals ===
2 November 2018
	Brazil	(Brazil)	1 - 2	(Angola)	Angola
	Mexico	(Mexico)	0 - 4	(Turkey)	Turkey

=== Bronze medal match ===
4 November 2014
	Brazil	(Brazil)	0 - 0 (pen. 5 - 4)	(Mexico)	Mexico

=== Gold medal match ===
4 November 2014
	Angola	(Angola)	0 - 0 (pen. 5 - 4)	(Turkey)	Turkey

== Rankings ==
Rank	Team
1	Angola
2	Turkey
3	Brazil
4	Mexico
5	Russia
6	England
7	Poland
8	Spain
9	Haiti
10	Japan
11	Argentina
12	Kenya
13	Ireland
14	Italy
15	Colombia
16	France
17	United States
18	Costa Rica
18	Nigeria
20	El Salvador
21	Uruguay
22	Ukraine

2018 Amputee Football World Cup

Angola
1st title
