= 2017 European Amputee Football Championship =

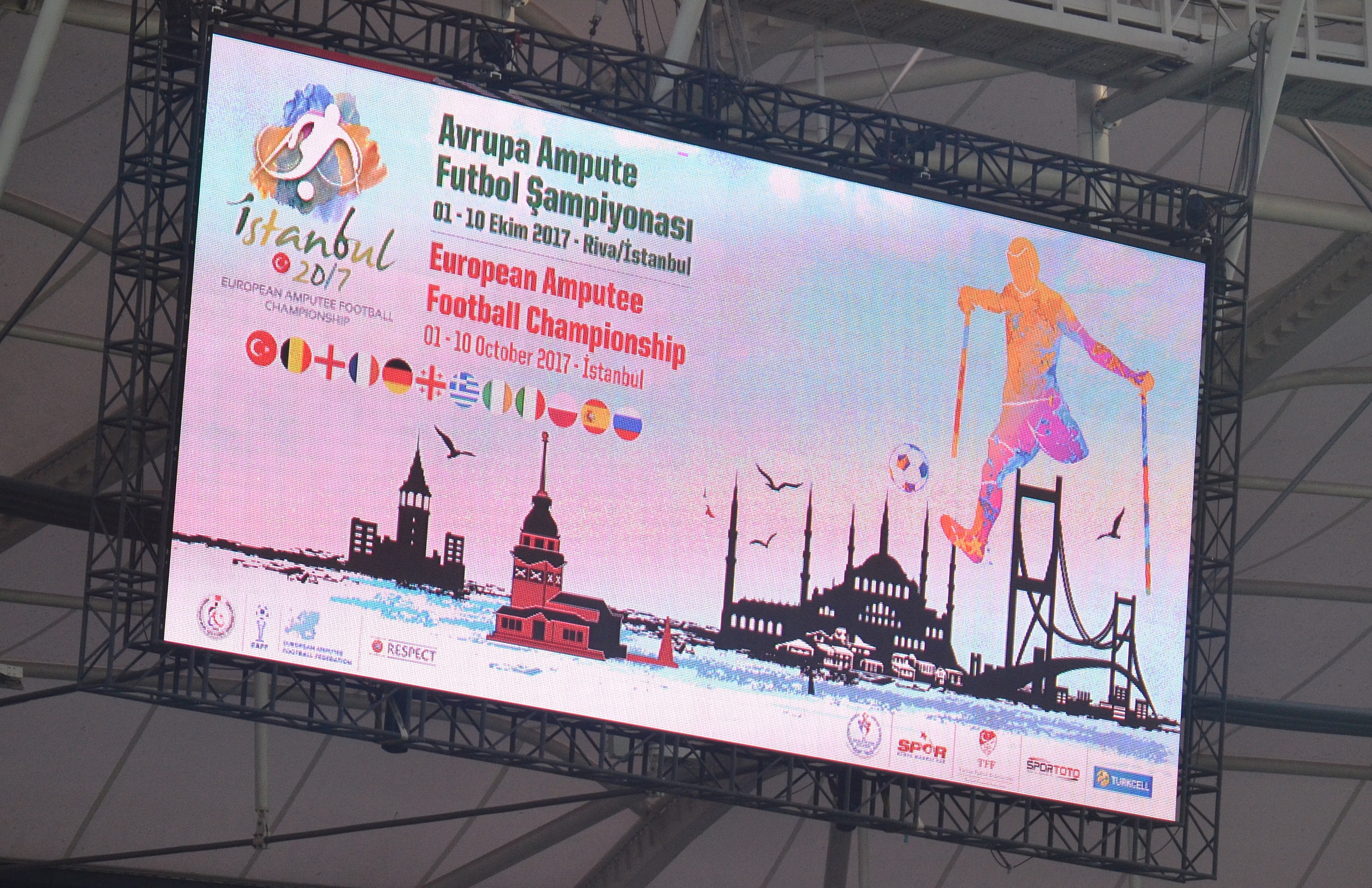

Tournament details
- Host country: Turkey
- City: Istanbul
- Dates: 2–9 October
- Teams: 12

Final positions
- Champions: Turkey (1st title)
- Runners-up: England
- Third place: Poland
- Fourth place: Spain

Tournament statistics
- Matches played: 34
- Goals scored: 126 (3.71 per match)

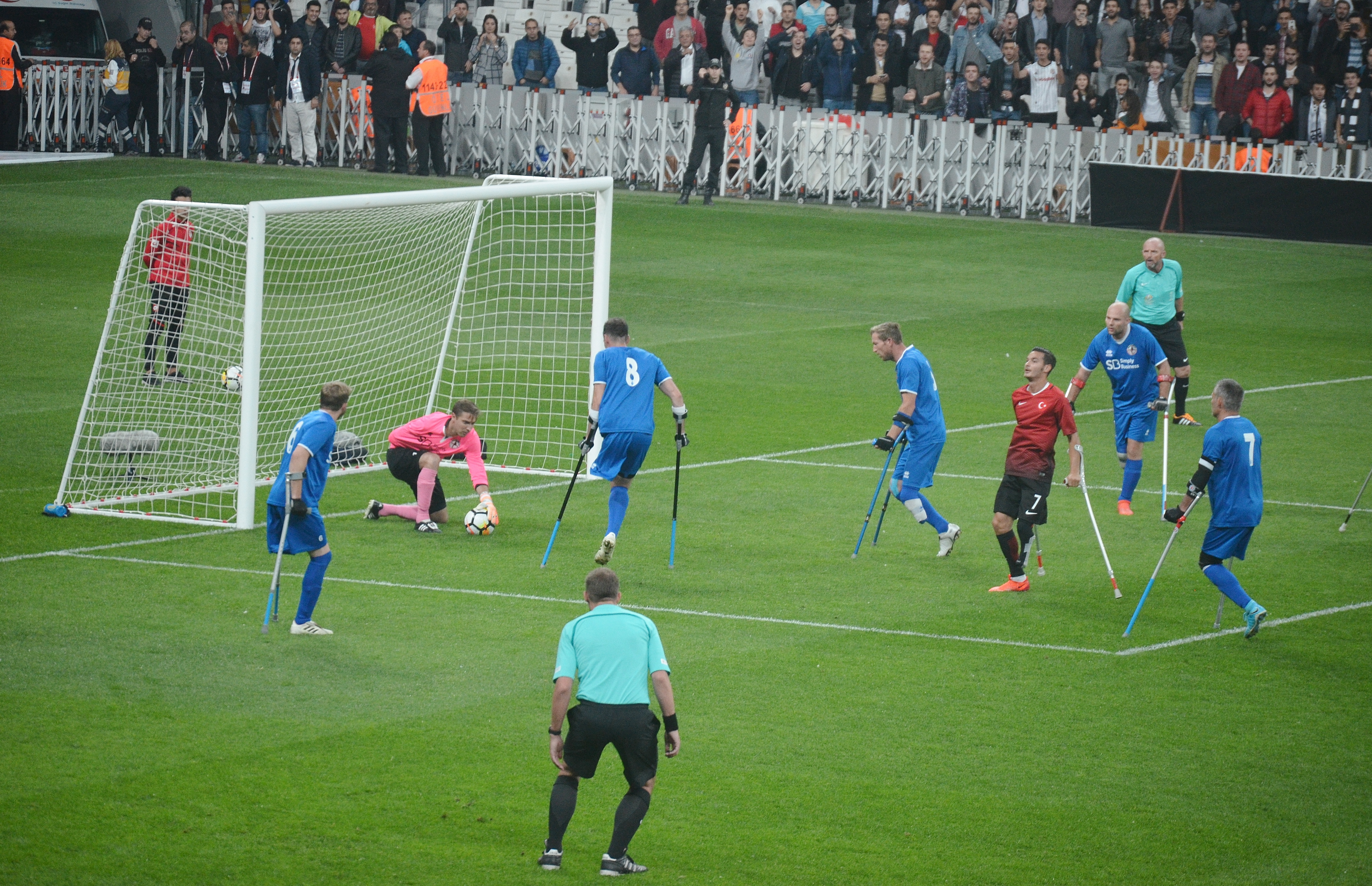
Turkey (red) attacking England (blue) in the final match.

The 2017 European Amputee Football Championship was the fourth edition of the annual international competition of amputee football national men's teams. It was organized by the European Amputee Football Federation (EAFF), and was held in Istanbul, Turkey between October 2–9, 2017. The championship's drawing ceremony took place in Riva, Istanbul on August 19 to determine the groups.

Turkey won the title for the first time, defeating England in the final. Poland became bronze medalist before Spain. All matches were played at the Turkish Football Federation Hasan Doğan National Teams Camp and Training Facility in Riva, Beykoz but the final at Vodafone Park in Beşiktaş.

== Participating nations ==
Following 12 nations competed in three groups. The first two ranking teams (green) in each group plus the two best third-ranking teams (lime green) qualified for the knockout stage of quarterfinals.

- Belgium
- England
- France
- Georgia
- Germany
- Greece
- Ireland
- Italy
- Poland
- Russia
- Spain
- Turkey

== Preliminary round ==
=== Group A ===
Team	Pld	W	D	L	GF	GA	GD	P
Turkey	3	3	0	0	20	0	+20	9
Spain	3	2	0	1	6	5	+1	6
Germany	3	0	1	2	2	10	−8	1
Georgia	3	0	1	2	1	14	−13	1

2 October 2017
17:00 EDT	Turkey	(Turkey)	7 – 0	(Germany)	Germany	Riva 4
3 October 2017
11:00 EDT	Spain	(Spain)	4 – 0	(Georgia (country))	Georgia	Riva 2
4 October 2017
10:30 EDT	Spain	(Spain)	2 – 1	(Germany)	Germany	Riva 2
18:00 EDT	Turkey	(Turkey)	9 – 0	(Georgia (country))	Georgia	Riva 4
5 October 2017
13:00 EDT	Germany	(Germany)	1 – 1	(Georgia (country))	Georgia	Riva 2
18:00 EDT	Turkey	(Turkey)	4 – 0	(Spain)	Spain	Riva 4

=== Group B ===
Team	Pld	W	D	L	GF	GA	GD	P
Poland	3	3	0	0	12	1	+11	9
Italy	3	1	1	1	4	3	+1	4
France	3	1	1	1	4	5	-1	4
Belgium	3	0	0	3	0	11	−11	0

3 October 2017
12:30 EDT	Poland	(Poland)	5 – 1	(France)	France	Riva 4
14:00 EDT	Italy	(Italy)	4 – 0	(Belgium)	Belgium	Riva 2
4 October 2017
13:30 EDT	Italy	(Italy)	0 – 0	(France)	France	Riva 2
15:00 EDT	Poland	(Poland)	4 – 0	(Belgium)	Belgium	Riva 4
5 October 2017
10:30 EDT	France	(France)	3 – 0	(Belgium)	Belgium	Riva 2
15:00 EDT	Poland	(Poland)	3 – 0	(Italy)	Italy	Riva 4

=== Group C ===
Team	Pld	W	D	L	GF	GA	GD	P
England	3	3	0	0	10	0	+10	9
Russia	3	2	0	1	12	1	+11	6
Ireland	3	1	0	2	4	3	+1	3
Greece	3	0	0	3	0	22	−22	0

3 October 2017
15:30 EDT	England	(England)	8 – 0	(Greece)	Greece	Riva 4
17:00 EDT	Russia	(Russia)	2 – 0	(Republic of Ireland)	Ireland	Riva 2
4 October 2017
12:00 EDT	Russia	(Russia)	10 – 0	(Greece)	Greece	Riva 4
16:30 EDT	England	(England)	1 – 0	(Republic of Ireland)	Ireland	Riva 2
5 October 2017
12:00 EDT	Ireland	(Republic of Ireland)	4 – 0	(Greece)	Greece	Riva 4
16:30 EDT	Russia	(Russia)	0 – 1	(England)	England	Riva 2

=== 9th–12th place round ===
Team	Pld	W	D	L	GF	GA	GD	P
Germany	3	2	1	0	8	4	+4	7
Georgia	3	2	0	1	11	7	+4	6
Belgium	3	0	2	1	3	6	−3	2
Greece	3	0	1	2	1	6	−5	1

7 October 2017
	Georgia	(Georgia (country))	5 – 2	(Belgium)	Belgium	Riva 2
	Germany	(Germany)	2 – 1	(Greece)	Greece	Riva 2
8 October 2017
	Greece	(Greece)	0 – 4	(Georgia (country))	Georgia	Riva 2
	Belgium	(Belgium)	1 – 1	(Germany)	Germany	Riva 2
9 October 2017
	Greece	(Greece)	0–0	(Belgium)	Belgium	Riva 2
	Georgia	(Georgia (country))	2 – 5	(Germany)	Germany	Riva 4

== Knockout stage ==
Quarterfinals
A1	Turkey	2
C2	Russia	1
B1	Poland	5
C3	(Republic of Ireland) Ireland	0
C1	England	2
B3	France	0
A2	Spain	2
B2	Italy	1

Semifinals
A1	Turkey	2
B1	Poland	0
C1	England	3
A2	Spain	0

Gold medal
A1	Turkey	2
C1	England	1
Bronze medal
B1	Poland	3
A2	Spain	1

Round of 4
B3	France	0
B2	Italy	1
C3	(Republic of Ireland) Ireland
C2	Russia	DNS

5th place
B2	Italy	2
C3	(Republic of Ireland) Ireland	0

=== Quarterfinals ===
7 October 2017
	Spain	(Spain)	2 – 1	(Italy)	Italy	Riva 4
	Poland	(Poland)	5 – 0	(Republic of Ireland)	Ireland	Riva 4
	England	(England)	2 – 0	(France)	France	Riva 4
	Turkey	(Turkey)	2 – 1	(Russia)	Russia	Riva 4

Russian team withdrawal

During the quarterfinal match of Turkey vs. Russia on October 7, 2017, Russian player Shakbulatov was shown a red card after receiving his second yellow card and was sent off. As he was leaving the pitch, he pushed a referee standing by the sideline down to the ground. Right after the incident, the match's referee decided to end the match in the 69th minute in the overtime while Turkey was in the lead by 2–1. The Russian team withdrew from the championship and did not show up in the further match against Ireland.

=== 5th–8th place knockout ===
8 October 2017
	France	(France)	0 – 1	(Italy)	Italy	Riva 2
	Ireland	(Republic of Ireland)	– DNS	(Russia)	Russia	Riva 2
9 October 2017
	Ireland	(Republic of Ireland)	0 – 2	(Italy)	Italy	Riva 2

=== Semifinals ===
8 October 2017
	Turkey	(Turkey)	2 – 0	(Poland)	Poland	Riva 4
	England	(England)	3 – 0	(Spain)	Spain	Riva 4

=== Bronze medal match ===
9 October 2017
	Poland	(Poland)	3 – 1	(Spain)	Spain	Riva 4

=== Gold medal match ===
9 October 2017
	Turkey	(Turkey)	2 – 1	(England)	England	Vodafone Park

== Rankings ==
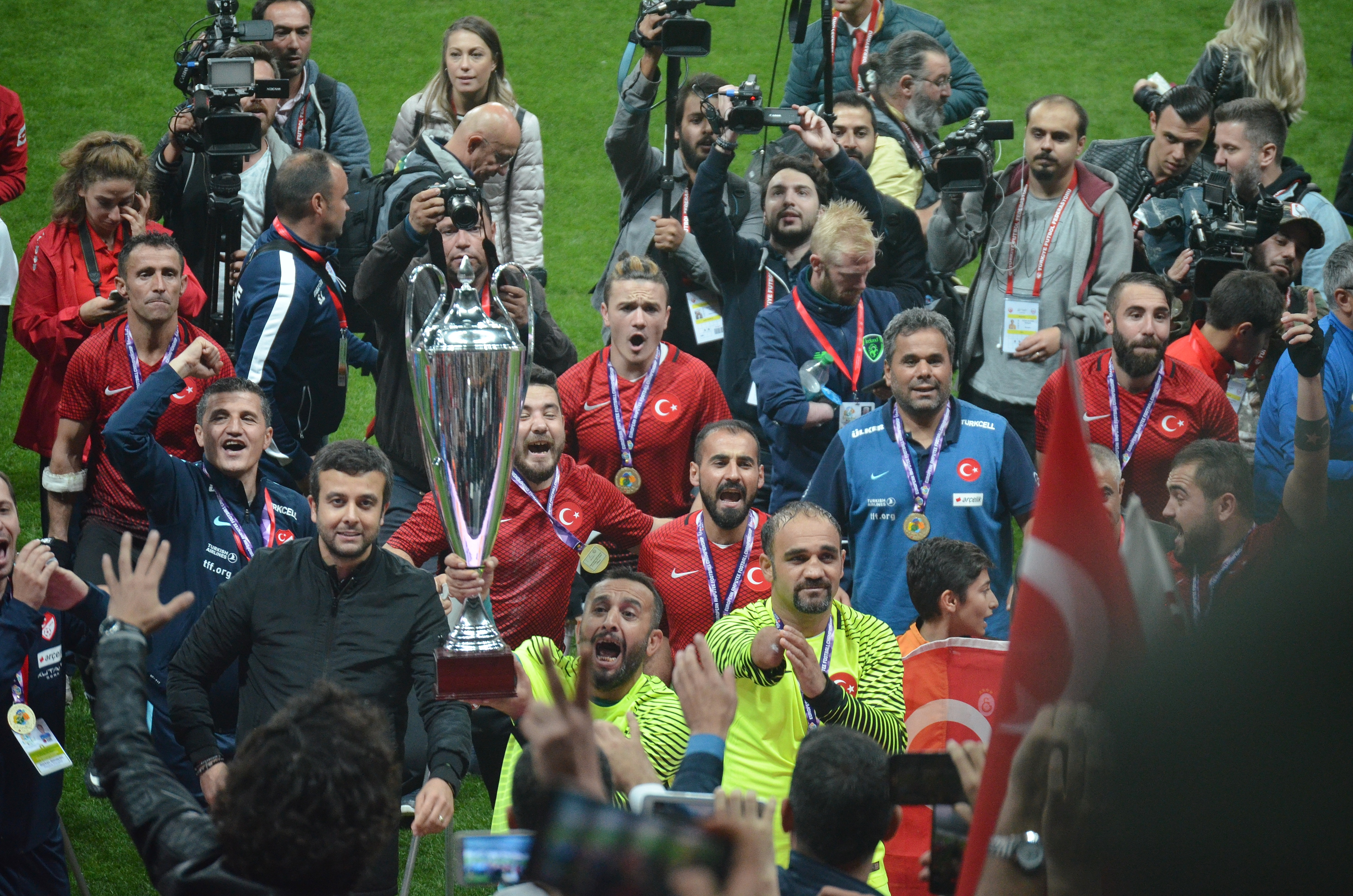
Turkish team enjoying the championship title holding the cup.

Rank	Team
1	Turkey
2	England
3	Poland
4	Spain
5	Italy
6	Ireland
7	France
8	Germany
9	Georgia
10	Belgium
11	Greece
12	Russia

2017 European Amputee Football Championship
(Turkey)
Turkey
First title
