= 2021 European Amputee Football Championship =

Tournament details
- Host country: Poland
- City: Kraków
- Dates: 12–19 September 2021
- Teams: 14
- Venue: Garbarnia Stadium

Final positions
- Champions: Turkey (2nd title)
- Runners-up: Spain
- Third place: Poland
- Fourth place: Russia

Tournament statistics
- Matches played: 37
- Goals scored: 144 (3.89 per match)

The 2021 European Amputee Football Championship was the fifth edition of the international competition of amputee football national men's teams. It was organized by the European Amputee Football Federation (EAFF), and was held in Kraków, Poland between September 12–19, 2021. Turkey won the title for the second time, defeating Spain in the final. Poland became bronze medalist before Russia.

== Participating nations ==
Following 14 nations competed in four groups.

- Belgium
- England
- France
- Georgia
- Germany
- Greece
- Ireland
- Israel
- Italy
- Poland
- Russia
- Spain
- Turkey
- Ukraine

== Preliminary round ==
=== Group A ===
Team	Pld	W	D	L	GF	GA	GD	P
Poland	3	2	1	0	12	1	+11	7
Spain	3	2	1	0	5	1	+4	7
Ukraine	3	1	0	2	5	4	+1	3
Israel	3	0	0	3	0	16	-16	0

12 September 2021
	Poland	(Poland)	3 – 0	(Ukraine)	Ukraine	Cracovia Stadium
13 September 2021
	Israel	(Israel)	0 – 3	(Spain)	Spain	Garbarnia Stadium
14 September 2021
	Spain	(Spain)	1 – 0	(Ukraine)	Ukraine	Garbarnia Stadium
	Poland	(Poland)	8 – 0	(Israel)	Israel	Pradniczanka Stadium
15 September 2021
	Ukraine	(Ukraine)	5 – 0	(Israel)	Israel	Garbarnia Stadium
	Poland	(Poland)	1 – 1	(Spain)	Spain	Pradniczanka Stadium

=== Group B ===
Team	Pld	W	D	L	GF	GA	GD	P
England	2	2	0	0	7	0	+7	6
France	2	1	0	1	2	3	-1	3
Greece	2	0	0	2	1	7	-6	0

13 September 2021
	Greece	(Greece)	0 – 5	(England)	England	Garbarnia Stadium
14 September 2021
	France	(France)	2 – 1	(Greece)	Greece	Garbarnia Stadium
15 September 2021
	England	(England)	2 – 0	(France)	France	Garbarnia Stadium

=== Group C ===
Team	Pld	W	D	L	GF	GA	GD	P
Russia	3	3	0	0	16	0	+16	9
Ireland	3	2	0	1	10	3	+7	6
Germany	3	1	0	2	6	9	-3	3
Belgium	3	0	0	3	0	20	-20	0

13 September 2021
	Ireland	(Republic of Ireland)	8 – 0	(Belgium)	Belgium	Garbarnia Stadium
	Russia	(Russia)	7 – 0	(Germany)	Germany	Garbarnia Stadium
14 September 2021
	Belgium	(Belgium)	0 – 7	(Russia)	Russia	Garbarnia Stadium
	Ireland	(Republic of Ireland)	2 – 1	(Germany)	Germany	Garbarnia Stadium
15 September 2021
	Germany	(Germany)	5 – 0	(Belgium)	Belgium	Garbarnia Stadium
	Russia	(Russia)	2 – 0	(Republic of Ireland)	Ireland	Garbarnia Stadium

=== Group D ===
Team	Pld	W	D	L	GF	GA	GD	P
Turkey	2	2	0	0	21	0	+21	6
Italy	2	1	0	1	2	11	-9	3
Georgia	2	0	0	2	0	12	-12	0

13 September 2021
	Georgia	(Georgia (country))	0 – 10	(Turkey)	Turkey	Garbarnia Stadium
14 September 2021
	Italy	(Italy)	2 – 0	(Georgia (country))	Georgia	Garbarnia Stadium
15 September 2021
	Turkey	(Turkey)	11 – 0	(Italy)	Italy	Garbarnia Stadium

== Knockout stage ==
=== Positions 9-14 ===
Positions 9-14
A4	Israel	1
B3	Greece	3
C4	Belgium	0
D3	(Georgia (country)) Georgia	8

Positions 9-12
A3	Ukraine	0
B3	Greece	1
C3	Germany	2
D3	(Georgia (country)) Georgia	1
13th place
C4	Belgium	0
A4	Israel	1

9th place
B3	Greece	0
C3	Germany	1
11th place
A3	Ukraine	0 (1)
D3	(Georgia (country)) Georgia	0 (3)

Positions 9-14

17 September 2021
	Israel	(Israel)	1 – 3	(Greece)	Greece	Garbarnia Stadium
	Belgium	(Belgium)	0 – 8	(Georgia (country))	Georgia	Pradniczanka Stadium

13th place

18 September 2021
	Belgium	(Belgium)	0 - 1	(Israel)	Israel	Garbarnia Stadium

Positions 9-12

18 September 2021
	Ukraine	(Ukraine)	0 - 1	(Greece)	Greece	Garbarnia Stadium
	Germany	(Germany)	2 - 1	(Georgia (country))	Georgie	Garbarnia Stadium

11th place

19 September 2021
	Ukraine	(Ukraine)	0 - 0 (pen. 1 - 3)	(Georgia (country))	Georgia	Garbarnia Stadium

9th place

19 September 2021
	Greece	(Greece)	0 - 1	(Germany)	Germany	Garbarnia Stadium

=== Quarterfinals ===
Quarterfinals
A1	Poland	2
B2	France	0
B1	England	1 (6)
A2	Spain	1 (7)
C1	Russia	2
D2	Italy	0
D1	Turkey	4
C2	(Republic of Ireland) Ireland	0

Semifinals
A1	Poland	1
A2	Spain	2
C1	Russia	2
D1	Turkey	5

Gold medal
A2	Spain	0
D1	Turkey	6
Bronze medal
A1	Poland	1
C1	Russia	0

Positions 5-8
B2	France	0
B1	England	3
D2	Italy	3
C2	(Republic of Ireland) Ireland	1

5th place
B1	England	4
D2	Italy	0
7th place
B2	France	1
C2	(Republic of Ireland) Ireland	0

Quarterfinals

17 September 2021
	Russia	(Russia)	2 – 0	(Italy)	Italy	Garbarnia Stadium
	Turkey	(Turkey)	4 – 0	(Republic of Ireland)	Ireland	Garbarnia Stadium
	Poland	(Poland)	2 – 0	(France)	France	Pradniczanka Stadium
	England	(England)	1 - 1 (pen. 6 - 7)	(Spain)	Spain	Pradniczanka Stadium

Positions 5-8

18 September 2021
	France	(France)	0 - 3	(England)	England	Garbarnia Stadium
	Italy	(Italy)	3 - 1 (a.e.t.)	(Republic of Ireland)	Ireland	Garbarnia Stadium

7th place

19 September 2021
	France	(France)	1 - 0	(Republic of Ireland)	Ireland	Garbarnia Stadium

5th place

19 September 2021
	England	(England)	4 - 0	(Italy)	Italy	Garbarnia Stadium

Semi-finals

18 September 2021
	Poland	(Poland)	1 - 2	(Spain)	Spain	Cracovia Stadium
	Turkey	(Turkey)	5 - 2	(Russia)	Russia	Cracovia Stadium

3rd place

19 September 2021
	Poland	(Poland)	1 - 0	(Russia)	Russia	Cracovia Stadium

Final

19 September 2021
	Spain	(Spain)	0 - 6	(Turkey)	Turkey	Cracovia Stadium

== Rankings ==
Rank	Team
1	Turkey
2	Spain
3	Poland
4	Russia
5	England
6	Italy
7	France
8	Ireland
9	Germany
10	Greece
11	Georgia
12	Ukraine
13	Israel
14	Belgium

2021 European Amputee Football Championship
(Turkey)
Turkey
Second title

== Awards ==
- Top goalscorer: (Turkey) Ömer Güleryüz (11 goals)
- Best goalkeeper: (Spain) Luis Ribeiro Medina
- Most valuable player: (Turkey) Ömer Güleryüz
- Fair play: Greece
