= 2022 Amputee Football World Cup =

Tournament details
- Host country: Turkey
- City: Istanbul
- Dates: 30 September–9 October 2022
- Teams: 24

Final positions
- Champions: Turkey (1st title)
- Runners-up: Angola
- Third place: Uzbekistan
- Fourth place: Haiti

Tournament statistics
- Matches played: 80
- Goals scored: 294 (3.68 per match)

The 2022 Amputee Football World Cup was 19th edition of the biannual international competition of amputee football national men's teams. It was organized by the World Amputee Football Federation (WAFF), and held in Istanbul, Turkey between 30 September–9 October 2022. The previous event took place in Mexico in 2018.

Turkey won the title for the first time, defeating Angola in the final by 4-1. Uzbekistan became bronze medalist, after defeating Haiti 4-2.

== Participating nations ==
- Angola
- Argentina
- Brazil
- Colombia
- England
- France
- Germany
- Haiti
- Indonesia
- Iran
- Iraq
- Ireland
- Italy
- Japan
- Liberia
- Mexico
- Morocco
- Poland
- Spain
- Tanzania
- Turkey (Host)
- United States
- Uruguay
- Uzbekistan

== Group stage ==
All times are local, TRT (UTC+03:00)

=== Tiebreakers ===
1. Total points
2. Head to head points
3. Head to head goal difference
4. Total goal difference
5. Total goals scored
6. Lowest number of red cards
7. Lowest number of yellow cards
8. Drawing of lots

=== Group A ===
| Pos | Team | Pld | W | D | L | GF | GA | GD | Pts | Qualification |
|---|---|---|---|---|---|---|---|---|---|---|
| 1 | Haiti | 3 | 2 | 1 | 0 | 11 | 2 | +9 | 7 | Advance to knockout phase |
| 2 | Turkey (H) | 3 | 2 | 1 | 0 | 9 | 1 | +8 | 7 | Advance to knockout phase |
| 3 | Liberia | 3 | 1 | 0 | 2 | 5 | 9 | −4 | 3 | 17-24th place classification play-offs |
| 4 | France | 3 | 0 | 0 | 3 | 0 | 13 | −13 | 0 | 17-24th place classification play-offs |

Source: WAFF World Cup 2022
Rules for classification: Group stage tiebreakers
(H) Hosts
30 September 2022
19:15

| Turkey | 3-0 | France |

Şükrü Saracoğlu Stadium, Istanbul
1 October 2022
12:30

| Haiti | 4-1 | Liberia |

TFF Riva Facility, Riva

2 October 2022
16:30

| Haiti | 6-0 | France |

TFF Riva Facility, Riva
2 October 2022
20:00

| Turkey | 5-0 | Liberia |

TFF Riva Facility, Riva

3 October 2022
12:30

| France | 0-4 | Liberia |

TFF Riva Facility, Riva
3 October 2022
20:00

| Turkey | 1-1 | Haiti |

TFF Riva Facility, Riva

=== Group B ===
| Pos | Team | Pld | W | D | L | GF | GA | GD | Pts | Qualification |
|---|---|---|---|---|---|---|---|---|---|---|
| 1 | Japan | 3 | 3 | 0 | 0 | 8 | 1 | +7 | 9 | Advance to knockout phase |
| 2 | Mexico | 3 | 1 | 1 | 1 | 6 | 4 | +2 | 4 | Advance to knockout phase |
| 3 | Colombia | 3 | 1 | 1 | 1 | 5 | 4 | +1 | 4 | Advance to knockout phase |
| 4 | Germany | 3 | 0 | 0 | 3 | 1 | 11 | −10 | 0 | 17-24th place classification play-offs |

Source: WAFF World Cup 2022
Rules for classification: Group stage tiebreakers
1 October 2022
11:00

| Japan | 3-0 | Germany |

TFF Riva Facility, Riva
1 October 2022
11:30

| Mexico | 1-1 | Colombia |

TFF Riva Facility, Riva

2 October 2022
12:00

| Japan | 3-1 | Colombia |

TFF Riva Facility, Riva
2 October 2022
12:30

| Mexico | 5-1 | Germany |

TFF Riva Facility, Riva

3 October 2022
12:00

| Mexico | 0-2 | Japan |

TFF Riva Facility, Riva
3 October 2022
12:00

| Colombia | 3-0 | Germany |

TFF Riva Facility, Riva

=== Group C ===
| Pos | Team | Pld | W | D | L | GF | GA | GD | Pts | Qualification |
|---|---|---|---|---|---|---|---|---|---|---|
| 1 | Argentina | 3 | 3 | 0 | 0 | 9 | 3 | +6 | 9 | Advance to knockout phase |
| 2 | United States | 3 | 2 | 0 | 1 | 7 | 3 | +4 | 6 | Advance to knockout phase |
| 3 | England | 3 | 1 | 0 | 2 | 5 | 4 | +1 | 3 | Advance to knockout phase |
| 4 | Indonesia | 3 | 0 | 0 | 3 | 0 | 11 | −11 | 0 | 17-24th place classification play-offs |

Source: WAFF World Cup 2022
Rules for classification: Group stage tiebreakers
1 October 2022
13:00

| England | 0-1 | United States |

TFF Riva Facility, Riva
1 October 2022
14:00

| Argentina | 3-0 | Indonesia |

TFF Riva Facility, Riva

2 October 2022
11:00

| Argentina | 3-1 | United States |

TFF Riva Facility, Riva
2 October 2022
14:30

| England | 3-0 | Indonesia |

TFF Riva Facility, Riva

3 October 2022
16:30

| England | 2-3 | Argentina |

TFF Riva Facility, Riva
3 October 2022
16:30

| United States | 5-0 | Indonesia |

TFF Riva Facility, Riva

=== Group D ===
| Pos | Team | Pld | W | D | L | GF | GA | GD | Pts | Qualification |
|---|---|---|---|---|---|---|---|---|---|---|
| 1 | Iran | 3 | 2 | 1 | 0 | 3 | 0 | +3 | 7 | Advance to knockout phase |
| 2 | Brazil | 3 | 2 | 0 | 1 | 6 | 1 | +5 | 6 | Advance to knockout phase |
| 3 | Morocco | 3 | 1 | 1 | 1 | 6 | 2 | +4 | 4 | Advance to knockout phase |
| 4 | Republic of Ireland | 3 | 0 | 0 | 3 | 0 | 12 | −12 | 0 | 17-24th place classification play-offs |

Source: WAFF World Cup 2022
Rules for classification: Group stage tiebreakers
1 October 2022
15:30

| Ireland (Republic of Ireland) | 0-6 | Morocco |

TFF Riva Facility, Riva
1 October 2022
16:30

| Brazil | 0-1 | Iran |

TFF Riva Facility, Riva

2 October 2022
13:30

| Ireland (Republic of Ireland) | 0-2 | Iran |

TFF Riva Facility, Riva
2 October 2022
14:00

| Brazil | 2-0 | Morocco |

TFF Riva Facility, Riva

3 October 2022
15:00

| Brazil | 4-0 | (Republic of Ireland) Ireland |

TFF Riva Facility, Riva
3 October 2022
15:00

| Iran | 0-0 | Morocco |

TFF Riva Facility, Riva

=== Group E ===
| Pos | Team | Pld | W | D | L | GF | GA | GD | Pts | Qualification |
|---|---|---|---|---|---|---|---|---|---|---|
| 1 | Uzbekistan | 3 | 2 | 0 | 1 | 6 | 3 | +3 | 6 | Advance to knockout phase |
| 2 | Poland | 3 | 2 | 0 | 1 | 7 | 3 | +4 | 6 | Advance to knockout phase |
| 3 | Tanzania | 3 | 1 | 1 | 1 | 2 | 3 | −1 | 4 | Advance to knockout phase |
| 4 | Spain | 3 | 0 | 1 | 2 | 0 | 6 | −6 | 1 | 17-24th place classification play-offs |

Source: WAFF World Cup 2022
Rules for classification: Group stage tiebreakers
1 October 2022
12:00

| Poland | 1-3 | Uzbekistan |

TFF Riva Facility, Riva
1 October 2022
13:30

| Spain | 0-0 | Tanzania |

TFF Riva Facility, Riva

2 October 2022
11:30

| Poland | 3-0 | Tanzania |

TFF Riva Facility, Riva
2 October 2022
13:00

| Spain | 0-3 | Uzbekistan |

TFF Riva Facility, Riva

3 October 2022
11:00

| Uzbekistan | 0-2 | Tanzania |

TFF Riva Facility, Riva
3 October 2022
18:00

| Poland | 3-0 | Spain |

TFF Riva Facility, Riva

=== Group F ===
| Pos | Team | Pld | W | D | L | GF | GA | GD | Pts | Qualification |
|---|---|---|---|---|---|---|---|---|---|---|
| 1 | Angola | 3 | 3 | 0 | 0 | 15 | 1 | +14 | 9 | Advance to knockout phase |
| 2 | Italy | 3 | 1 | 1 | 1 | 3 | 8 | −5 | 4 | Advance to knockout phase |
| 3 | Iraq | 3 | 1 | 0 | 2 | 4 | 8 | −4 | 3 | 17-24th place classification play-offs |
| 4 | Uruguay | 3 | 0 | 1 | 2 | 3 | 8 | −5 | 1 | 17-24th place classification play-offs |

Source: WAFF World Cup 2022
Rules for classification: Group stage tiebreakers
1 October 2022
14:30

| Italy | 2-0 | Iraq |

TFF Riva Facility, Riva
1 October 2022
15:00

| Angola | 4-0 | Uruguay |

TFF Riva Facility, Riva

2 October 2022
15:00

| Angola | 4-1 | Iraq |

TFF Riva Facility, Riva
2 October 2022
16:00

| Italy | 1-1 | Uruguay |

TFF Riva Facility, Riva

3 October 2022
13:30

| Angola | 7-0 | Italy |

TFF Riva Facility, Riva
3 October 2022
13:30

| Uruguay | 2-3 | Iraq |

TFF Riva Facility, Riva

=== Ranking of third-placed teams ===
| Pos | Grp | Team | Pld | W | D | L | GF | GA | GD | Pts | Qualification |
|---|---|---|---|---|---|---|---|---|---|---|---|
| 1 | D | Morocco | 3 | 1 | 1 | 1 | 6 | 2 | +4 | 4 | Advance to knockout phase |
| 2 | B | Colombia | 3 | 1 | 1 | 1 | 5 | 4 | +1 | 4 | Advance to knockout phase |
| 3 | E | Tanzania | 3 | 1 | 1 | 1 | 2 | 3 | −1 | 4 | Advance to knockout phase |
| 4 | C | England | 3 | 1 | 0 | 2 | 5 | 4 | +1 | 3 | Advance to knockout phase |
| 5 | A | Liberia | 3 | 1 | 0 | 2 | 5 | 9 | −4 | 3 | 17-24th place classification play-offs |
| 6 | F | Iraq | 3 | 1 | 0 | 2 | 4 | 8 | −4 | 3 | 17-24th place classification play-offs |

Source: WAFF World Cup 2022
Rules for classification: Group stage tiebreakers

== Knockout phase ==
=== Bracket ===
Round of 16
5 October
Argentina | 0
Morocco | 4
5 October
Turkey | 5
Mexico | 0
5 October
Uzbekistan | 4
Colombia | 1
5 October
Iran | 0
Italy | 1
5 October
Angola (a.e.t.) | 1
England | 0
5 October
Brazil | 2
Poland | 1
5 October
Japan | 1
Tanzania | 3
5 October
Haiti (a.e.t.) | 6
United States | 2

Quarterfinals
6 October
Morocco | 1
Turkey | 4
6 October
Uzbekistan | 5
Italy | 1
6 October
Angola | 2
Brazil | 1
6 October
Tanzania | 1
Haiti | 4

Semifinals
7 October
Turkey | 1
Uzbekistan | 0
7 October
Angola | 4
Haiti | 2

Final
9 October
Turkey | 4
Angola | 1
3rd place game
9 October
Uzbekistan | 4
Haiti | 2

== Classification play-offs ==
=== 5-8th place classification ===
5-8th place semifinals
7 October
Morocco | 3
Italy | 0
7 October
Brazil | 2
Tanzania | 0

5th place game
9 October
Morocco | 2
Brazil | 0
7th place game
9 October
Italy | 0
Tanzania | 2

=== 9-16th place classification ===
9-16th place quarterfinals
6 October
Argentina | 3
Mexico | 1
6 October
Colombia (p) | 0 (7)
Iran | 0 (6)
6 October
England | 3
Poland | 0
6 October
Japan (a.e.t.) | 4
United States | 3

9-12th place semifinals
7 October
Argentina (a.e.t.) | 4
Colombia | 2
7 October
England | 2
Japan | 0

9th place game
9 October
Argentina | 3
England (a.e.t.) | 4
11th place game
9 October
Colombia | 1
Japan | 3

13-16th place semifinals
7 October
Mexico | 1
Iran | 3
7 October
Poland | 3
United States | 1

13th place game
9 October
Iran | 0
Poland | 2
15th place game
9 October
Mexico | 0
United States | 1

=== 17-24th place classification ===
17-24th place quarterfinals
5 October
Iraq | 4
Germany | 0
5 October
France | 1
Indonesia | 0
5 October
(Republic of Ireland) Ireland (p) | 1 (4)
Uruguay | 1 (3)
5 October
Liberia | 2
Spain | 1

17-20th place semifinals
7 October
Iraq | 1
France | 3
7 October
(Republic of Ireland) Ireland | 3
Liberia | 6

17th place game
9 October
France | 0
Liberia | 1
19th place game
9 October
Iraq (a.e.t.) | 4
(Republic of Ireland) Ireland | 3

21-24th place semifinals
7 October
Germany | 0
Indonesia | 2
7 October
Uruguay | 4
Spain | 2

21st place game
9 October
Indonesia | 2
Uruguay | 3
23rd place game
9 October
Germany | 0
Spain | 8

== Rankings ==
| Rank | Team |
|---|---|
| 1 | Turkey |
| 2 | Angola |
| 3 | Uzbekistan |
| 4 | Haiti |
| 5 | Morocco |
| 6 | Brazil |
| 7 | Tanzania |
| 8 | Italy |
| 9 | England |
| 10 | Argentina |
| 11 | Japan |
| 12 | Colombia |
| 13 | Poland |
| 14 | Iran |
| 15 | United States |
| 16 | Mexico |
| 17 | Liberia |
| 18 | France |
| 19 | Iraq |
| 20 | (Republic of Ireland) Ireland |
| 21 | Uruguay |
| 22 | Indonesia |
| 23 | Spain |
| 24 | Germany |

2022 Amputee Football World Cup
(Turkey)
Turkey
First title
