= Greece Amputee Football Association =

Greek governing body of amputee football

- Nickname(s): Ethniki (the national); Galanolefki (the sky blues and whites)
- Association: Greece Amputee Football Association
- Confederation: UEFA (Europe)
- Head coach: Apostolis Baltoumas
- Captain: Tasos Tsigkas
First colours	Second colours

First international
- Greece 0–5 England (Athens, Greece; 9 June 2017)

Biggest win
- Greece 9–0 Albania (Athens, Greece; 13 July 2021)

Biggest defeat
- Japan 13–0 Greece (Warsaw, Poland; 24 June 2017)

European Championship
- Appearances: 3 (first in 2017)
- Best result: 10th (2021)

Nations League
- Appearances: 1 (first in 2023)
- Best result: 4th (2023, Division C)

Amp Futbol Cup
- Appearances: 2 (first in 2017)
- Best result: Winners (2018)

The Greece Amputee Football Association (Greek: Ελληνική Ένωση Ακρωτηριασμένων Ποδοσφαιριστών, Elliniki Enosi Akrotiriasmenon Podosfairiston) is the Greek governing body of amputee football and represents Greece at international events and competitions. In February 2016, Amputee Football Greece became the 14th member of the European Amputee Football Federation (EAFF).

== History ==
=== Establishment, first official game and competition ===
In June 2016, Greece made its debut in the EAFF Amputee Football Weeks project, reflecting the nation’s commitment to promoting amputee football and supporting athletes with disabilities. The project took place in Corinth and featured the following players: Alexandros Theodoridis, Dimitris Vouvopoulos, Tasos Tsigas, Georgios Lazaridis, Vasilis Mpakogiannis, Nikolaos Papakyrgiakis, Ioannis Vasiadis, Dimitris Agrianitis, and Nikolaos Papaggelis. An informal training match against AEK Futsal in Pallini marked the inaugural game of the newly established team. On January 8, 2017, the national team participated in a charity tournament against teams representing the Olympiacos academy staff and the Greek national homeless team. The initiative aimed to raise awareness about poverty while helping provide food for homeless communities. Greece played its first official friendly match on June 9, 2017, losing 0–5 to England. Later that month, on June 24, Greece participated in the Amputee Football Cup. The team faced Japan and Poland on the opening day of the tournament and France the following day, losing all three matches.

=== Consecutive European competition participations and first trophy ===
Greece made its first appearance at the European Championship on October 3, 2017. On October 21, 2018, the national team achieved a major milestone by winning its first trophy at a friendly tournament held in Bruges, Belgium. To promote the sport, members of the Greece 2004 legends team played an exhibition match against the Greek amputee national team in July 2021. Greece competed in the 2021 European Amputee Football Championship, finishing in tenth place. In January 2022, the team received the Gazzetta Fair Play Award after earning 55,273 online votes from fans. In October 2023, Greece finished fourth in the EAFF Nations League Division C and qualified for Euro 2024 in France. At the 2024 European Amputee Football Championship, Greece advanced to the knockout stage after finishing third in its group with one win and two defeats. In the placement matches, the team lost to Azerbaijan and Israel but defeated Georgia to finish fifteenth overall. To mark its tenth anniversary, the UEFA Foundation for Children, with support from the Kaizen Foundation, organized a special match between two amputee teams featuring players from England, Greece, and Poland on April 28, 2025. The match took place at Colovray Sports Centre in Nyon ahead of the UEFA Youth League final between Barcelona and Trabzonspor.

== Honours ==
Greece Amputee Football Association honours
Type	Competition	Titles	Winners	Runners-up	Third place
Worldwide	WAFF Amputee World Cup	0			
International	EAFF European Championship	0			
International	EAFF Nations League	0			
International	EAFF Amp Futbol Cup	1	2018		
National	Greece Amputee FA Charity Cup	1	2017		

- record
- ^{S} Shared record

=== Fair play awards ===
- EAFF European Championship

Winners (1): 2021

- Tournoi des amputés à Bruges

Winners (1): 2018

- NIVEA MEN Gazzetta Awards

Winners (1): 2022

=== Medals by competition ===
Competition	Gold	Silver	Bronze	Total
WAFF Amputee World Cup	0	0	0	0
EAFF European Championship	0	0	0	0
EAFF Nations League	0	0	0	0
EAFF Amp Futbol Cup	1	0	0	1
Total	1	0	0	1

== All-time results and fixtures ==
Win Draw Loss

Friendlies

30 December 2016 Friendly	Greece	3–3	(Greece) AEK Futsal	Gerakas, Greece
20:30 EET (UTC+02:00)				Stadium: Fair Play; Attendance: 0

8 January 2017 Friendly	Greece	4–0	Greece Homeless	Egaleo, Greece
18:30 EET (UTC+02:00)				Stadium: Aleo FC; Attendance: ?

9 June 2017 Friendly	Greece	0–5	England	Athens, Greece
18:30 EET (UTC+02:00)				Stadium: Zireinio; Attendance: ?

Amp Football Cup

24 June 2017 Warsaw Cup	Japan	13–0	Greece	Warsaw, Poland
15:00 EET (UTC+01:00)				Stadium: Hala Piłkarska Bemowo; Attendance: ?

24 June 2017 Warsaw Cup	Poland	11–0	Greece	Warsaw, Poland
18:30 CET (UTC+01:00)				Stadium: Hala Piłkarska Bemowo; Attendance: ?

25 June 2017 Warsaw Cup	France	4–0	Greece	Warsaw, Poland
13:00 CET (UTC+01:00)				Stadium: Hala Piłkarska Bemowo; Attendance: ?

Euro 2017

3 October 2017 Group C	England	8–0	Greece	Istanbul, Turkey
15:30 CET (UTC+01:00)				Attendance: ?

4 October 2017 Group C	Russia	10–0	Greece	Istanbul, Turkey
12:00 CET (UTC+01:00)				Attendance: ?

5 October 2017 Group C	Ireland (Republic of Ireland)	4–0	Greece	Istanbul, Turkey
12:00 CET (UTC+01:00)				Attendance: ?

7 October 2017 Positions 9-12	Germany	2–1	Greece	Istanbul, Turkey
15:30 CET (UTC+01:00)				Attendance: ?

8 October 2017 Positions 9-12	Greece	0–4	(Georgia (country)) Georgia	Istanbul, Turkey
15:30 CET (UTC+01:00)				Attendance: ?

9 October 2017 Positions 9-12	Greece	0–0	Belgium	Istanbul, Turkey
15:30 CET (UTC+01:00)				Attendance: ?

Amp Football Cup

20 October 2018 Bruges Cup	Greece	3–1	Netherlands	Bruges, Belgium
11:00 CET (UTC+01:00)				Attendance: ?

20 October 2018 Bruges Cup	Greece	0–2	Belgium	Bruges, Belgium
16:00 CET (UTC+01:00)				Attendance: ?

21 October 2018 Bruges Cup	Netherlands	1–1	Greece	Bruges, Belgium
12:00 CET (UTC+01:00)				Attendance: ?

21 October 2018 Bruges Cup	Belgium	1–2	Greece	Bruges, Belgium
17:00 CET (UTC+01:00)				Attendance: ?

Friendlies

11 May 2019 Friendly	Greece	3–0	Belgium	Rhodes, Greece
11:00 CET (UTC+01:00)

12 May 2019 Friendly	Greece	0–0	Belgium	Rhodes, Greece
11:00 CET (UTC+01:00)

27 September 2019 Friendly	Greece	5–1	Israel	Drama, Greece
17:00 CET (UTC+01:00)				Attendance: ?

28 September 2019 Friendly	Greece	3–0	Israel	Drama, Greece
18:00 CET (UTC+01:00)				Attendance: 2,000

30 June 2021 Friendly	Greece Legends 2004	?	Greece	Athens, Greece
21:00 CET (UTC+01:00)				Stadium: Peristeri Stadium

13 July 2021 Friendly	Greece	9–0	Albania	Athens, Greece
17:30 CET (UTC+01:00)

14 July 2021 Friendly	Greece	9–0	Albania	Athens, Greece
19:30 CET (UTC+01:00)

Euro 2021

13 September 2021 Group B	Greece	0–5	England	Kraków, Poland
00:00 CET (UTC+01:00)				Stadium: Garbarnia Stadium

14 September 2021 Group B	France	2–1	Greece	Kraków, Poland
00:00 CET (UTC+01:00)				Stadium: Garbarnia Stadium

17 September 2021 Position 9-14	Israel	1–3	Greece	Kraków, Poland
00:00 CET (UTC+01:00)				Stadium: Garbarnia Stadium

18 September 2021 Position 9-12	Ukraine	0–1	Greece	Kraków, Poland
00:00 CET (UTC+01:00)				Stadium: Garbarnia Stadium

19 September 2021 Position 9-10	Greece	0–1	Germany	Kraków, Poland
00:00 CET (UTC+01:00)				Stadium: Garbarnia Stadium

Nations League 2023

6 October 2023 Division C	Greece	1–2	Ukraine	Blankenberge, Belgium
15:00 CET (UTC+01:00)				Stadium: ?

7 October 2023 Division C	Greece	2–2	Israel	Blankenberge, Belgium
11:00 CET (UTC+01:00)				Stadium: ?

7 October 2023 Division C	Georgia (Georgia (country))	2–0	Greece	Blankenberge, Belgium
15:00 CET (UTC+01:00)				Stadium: ?

8 October 2023 Division C	Belgium	0–0	Greece	Blankenberge, Belgium
15:00 CET (UTC+01:00)				Stadium: ?

Euro 2024

2 June 2024 Group D	Greece	0–7	Poland	Haute-Savoie, France
13:00 CET (UTC+01:00)				Stadium: ?

3 June 2024 Group D	Germany	6–0	Greece	Haute-Savoie, France
12:00 CET (UTC+01:00)				Stadium: ?

4 June 2024 Group D	Greece	2–1	Scotland	Haute-Savoie, France
14:00 CET (UTC+01:00)				Stadium: ?

7 June 2024 Position 9-16	Azerbaijan	2–1	Greece	Haute-Savoie, France
13:30 CET (UTC+01:00)				Stadium: ?

8 June 2024 Position 13-16	Israel	2–1	Greece	Haute-Savoie, France
11:30 CET (UTC+01:00)				Stadium: ?

8 June 2024 Position 14-16	Greece	3–0	(Georgia (country)) Georgia	Haute-Savoie, France
21:30 CET (UTC+01:00)				Stadium: ?

Friendlies

28 April 2025 Friendly	Greece \England (mix)	?	Poland	Nyon, Switzerland
18:30 EET (UTC+02:00)				Stadium: Colovray Sports Centre; Attendance: ?

== Participations by competition ==
=== WAFF World Cup ===
WAFF World Cup record
Year	Group	Result	Position	Pld	W	D*	L	GF	GA	Ref.
(United States) 1986	Did not exist									
(United States) 1987	Did not exist									
(United States) 1988 (i)	Did not exist									
(United States) 1988 (o)	Did not exist									
(United States) 1989 (i)	Did not exist									
(United States) 1989 (o)	Did not exist									
(United States) 1990 (i)	Did not exist									
(United States) 1990 (o)	Did not exist									
(Uzbekistan) 1991 (i)	Did not exist									
(Uzbekistan) 1991 (o)	Did not exist									
(Russia) 1994	Did not exist									
(England) 1998	Did not exist									
(United States) 2000	Did not exist									
(Brazil) 2001	Did not exist									
(Russia) 2002	Did not exist									
(Uzbekistan) 2003	Did not exist									
(Brazil) 2005	Did not exist									
(Turkey) 2007	Did not exist									
(Argentina) 2010	Did not exist									
(Russia) 2012	Did not exist									
(Mexico) 2014	Did not exist									
(Mexico) 2018	Did not enter									
(Turkey) 2022	Did not enter									
(Mexico) 2026	To be determined									
Total	—	—	0/23	0	0	0	0	0	0	—

*Draws include knockout matches decided on penalty kicks.

Greece's World Cup history
First match	None
Biggest win	None
Biggest defeat	None
Best result	None
Worst result	None

=== EAFF European Championship ===
EAFF European Championship record
Year	Group	Result	Position	Pld	W	D*	L	GF	GA	Ref.
(Ukraine) 1999	Did not exist									
(Russia) 2006	Did not exist									
(Turkey) 2008	Did not exist									
(Turkey) 2017	C	Group stage	12th	6	0	1	5	1	28	
(Poland) 2021	B	Group stage	10th	5	2	0	3	5	9	
(France) 2024	D	Group stage	15th	6	2	0	4	7	18	
Total	—	Group stage	3/6	17	4	1	12	13	55	—

*Draws include knockout matches decided on penalty kicks.

Greece's European Championship history
First match	England 8–0 Greece (Istanbul, Turkey; 3 October 2017)
Biggest win	Greece 3–0 Georgia (Haute-Savoie, France; 8 June 2024)
Biggest defeat	Russia 10–0 Greece (Istanbul, Turkey; 4 October 2017)
Best result	Group stage (2017, 2021, 2024)
Worst result	Group stage (2017, 2021, 2024)

=== EAFF Nations League ===
EAFF Nations League record
Year	Division	Result	Position	Pld	W	D*	L	GF	GA	Ref.
(Belgium) 2023	C	Group stage	4th	4	0	2	2	3	6	
(Turkey) 2025	Did not enter									
Total	—	Group stage	1/2	4	0	2	2	3	6	—

*Draws include knockout matches decided on penalty kicks.

Greece's Nations League history
First match	Greece 1–2 Ukraine (Blankenberge, Belgium; 6 October 2023)
Biggest win	None
Biggest defeat	Georgia 2–0 Greece (Blankenberge, Belgium; 7 October 2023)
Best result	Group stage (2023)
Worst result	Group stage (2023)

=== EAFF Amp Futbol Cup ===
EAFF Amp Futbol Cup record
Year	Group	Result	Position	Pld	W	D*	L	GF	GA	Ref.
(Poland) 2012	Did not exist									
(Poland) 2013	Did not exist									
(Poland) 2014	Did not exist									
(Poland) 2015	Did not exist									
(Poland) 2016	Did not exist									
(Poland) 2017	A	Group stage	6th	3	0	0	3	0	28	
(Belgium) 2018	A	Winners	1st	4	2	1	1	6	5	
(Poland) 2026	Did not enter									
Total	—	Winners	2/2	7	2	1	4	6	33	—

*Draws include knockout matches decided on penalty kicks.

Greece's Amp Futbol Cup history
First match	Japan 13–0 Greece (Warsaw, Poland; 24 June 2017)
Biggest win	Greece 3–1 Netherlands (Bruges, Belgium; 20 October 2018)
Biggest defeat	Japan 13–0 Greece (Warsaw, Poland; 24 June 2017)
Best result	Winners (2018)
Worst result	Group stage (2017)

== Performance ==
=== Results by official competition ===
Season	Competition	Round	Opponent	Home	Away	Agg.	Qual.
2017	EAFF Amp Futbol Cup	Group A	Japan		13–0	4th	
2017	EAFF Amp Futbol Cup	Group A	Poland		11–0	4th	
2017	EAFF Amp Futbol Cup	Group A	France		4–0	4th	
2017	EAFF European Championship	Group C	England		8–0	4th	
2017	EAFF European Championship	Group C	Russia		10–0	4th	
2017	EAFF European Championship	Group C	(Republic of Ireland) Ireland		4–0	4th	
2017	EAFF European Championship	Positions 9-12	Germany		2–1	12th	
2017	EAFF European Championship	Positions 9-12	(Georgia (country)) Georgia	0–4		12th	
2017	EAFF European Championship	Positions 9-12	Belgium	0–0		12th	
2018	EAFF Amp Futbol Cup	Group A	Netherlands	3–1	1–1	1st	
2018	EAFF Amp Futbol Cup	Group A	Belgium	0–2	1–2	1st	
2021	EAFF European Championship	Group B	England	0–5		3rd	
2021	EAFF European Championship	Group B	France		2–1	3rd	
2021	EAFF European Championship	Positions 9-14	Israel		1–3	10th	
2021	EAFF European Championship	Positions 9-12	Ukraine		0–1	10th	
2021	EAFF European Championship	Positions 9-10	Germany	0–1		10th	
2023	EAFF Nations League	Division C	Ukraine	1–2		4th	
2023	EAFF Nations League	Division C	Israel	2–2		4th	
2023	EAFF Nations League	Division C	(Georgia (country)) Georgia		2–0	4th	
2023	EAFF Nations League	Division C	Belgium		0–0	4th	
2024	EAFF European Championship	Group D	Poland	0–7		3rd	
2024	EAFF European Championship	Group D	Germany		6–0	3rd	
2024	EAFF European Championship	Group D	Scotland	2–1		3rd	
2024	EAFF European Championship	Positions 9-16	Azerbaijan		2–1	15th	
2024	EAFF European Championship	Positions 13-16	Israel		2–1	15th	
2024	EAFF European Championship	Positions 14-16	(Georgia (country)) Georgia	3–0		15th	

Last updated: 11 June 2025

- Matches are classified as home or away depending on the team's allocation established after the European Amputee Football Federation's competition draw. Home and away games may not always take place at the designated home venue of the respective team.

=== Record by country of opposition ===
As of 5 July 2024, after the EURO 2024 match against Georgia.

Country	Home							Away							Total							
Country	Pld	W	D	L	GF	GA	GD	Pld	W	D	L	GF	GA	GD	Pld	W	D	L	GF	GA	GD	Win%
Albania	2	2	0	0	18	0	+18	0	0	0	0	0	0	0	2	2	0	0	18	0	+18	100.00
Azerbaijan	0	0	0	0	0	0	0	1	0	0	1	1	2	-1	1	0	0	1	1	2	-1	00.00
Belgium	4	1	2	1	3	2	+1	2	1	1	0	2	1	+1	6	2	3	1	5	3	+2	40.00
England	2	0	0	2	0	10	-10	1	0	0	1	0	8	-8	3	0	0	2	0	18	-18	00.00
France	0	0	0	0	0	0	0	2	0	0	2	1	6	-5	2	0	0	2	1	6	-5	00.00
Georgia	2	1	0	1	3	4	-1	1	0	0	1	0	2	-2	3	1	0	2	3	6	-3	33.33
Germany	1	0	0	1	0	1	-1	2	0	0	2	1	8	-7	3	0	0	3	1	9	-8	00.00
Ireland	0	0	0	0	0	0	0	1	0	0	1	0	4	-4	1	0	0	1	0	4	-4	00.00
Israel	3	2	1	0	10	3	+7	2	1	0	1	4	3	+1	5	3	1	1	14	6	+8	60.00
Netherlands	1	1	0	0	3	1	+2	1	0	1	0	1	1	0	2	1	1	0	4	2	+2	50.00
Poland	1	0	0	1	0	7	-7	1	0	0	1	0	11	-11	2	0	0	2	0	18	-18	00.00
Japan	0	0	0	0	0	0	0	1	0	0	1	0	13	-13	1	0	0	1	0	13	-13	00.00
Russia	0	0	0	0	0	0	0	1	0	0	1	0	10	-10	1	0	0	1	0	10	-10	00.00
Scotland	1	1	0	0	2	1	+1	0	0	0	0	0	0	0	1	1	0	0	2	1	+1	100.00
Ukraine	1	0	0	1	1	2	-1	1	1	0	0	1	0	+1	2	1	0	1	2	2	0	50.00
Total	18	8	3	7	40	31	+9	17	3	2	12	11	69	-58	35	11	5	19	51	100	-49	31.42

Last updated: 10 June 2025

=== Record by official competition ===
Competition	Home								Away								Total							
Competition	Pld	W	D	L	GF	GA	GD	Win%	Pld	W	D	L	GF	GA	GD	Win%	Pld	W	D	L	GF	GA	GD	Win%
WAFF Amputee World Cup	0	0	0	0	0	0	+0	—	0	0	0	0	0	0	+0	—	0	0	0	0	0	0	+0	—
EAFF European Championship	7	2	1	4	5	18	−13	28.57	10	2	0	8	8	37	−29	20.00	17	4	1	12	13	55	−42	23.53
EAFF Nations League	2	0	1	1	3	4	−1	0.00	2	0	1	1	0	2	−2	0.00	4	0	2	2	3	6	−3	0.00
EAFF Amp Futbol Cup	2	1	0	1	3	3	+0	50.00	5	1	1	3	3	30	−27	20.00	7	2	1	4	6	33	−27	28.57
Total	11	3	2	6	11	25	−14	27.27	17	3	2	12	11	69	−58	17.65	28	6	4	18	22	94	−72	21.43

Last updated: 11 June 2025

== Players ==
=== Current squad ===
As of matches played for Euro 2021.

The following players comprise the Greek national amputee football squad.
Official and unofficial games count as caps. Caps and goals accurate as of 28 September 2021.

No.	Pos.	Player	Date of birth (age)	Caps	Goals	Club
1	GK	Alexandros Ydraios	5 January 1988 (age 38)	18	0	(Hellenic Football Federation) free agent
12	GK	Labros Efthimiou	18 March 1991 (age 35)	5	0	(Hellenic Football Federation) free agent
23	GK	Alexandros Kapitsas	19 May 1994 (age 32)	5	0	(Hellenic Football Federation) free agent
6	DF	Petros Tsikouras	22 July 1981 (age 44)	23	0	(Hellenic Football Federation) free agent
5	DF	Georgios Lazaridis	5 November 2000 (age 25)	18	0	(Hellenic Football Federation) free agent
9	DF	Vasilis Bakogiannis	27 June 1985 (age 41)	22	0	(Hellenic Football Federation) free agent
7	DF	Theodoros Alexas	25 August 1984 (age 41)	14	0	(Hellenic Football Federation) free agent
11	MF	Tasos Tsigkas (Captain)	12 May 1984 (age 42)	22	0	(Hellenic Football Federation) free agent
20	MF	Vasilis Panidis	4 June 1990 (age 36)	16	0	(Hellenic Football Federation) free agent
10	MF	Dimitris Tsikourelis	15 September 1985 (age 40)	9	0	(Hellenic Football Federation) free agent
13	MF	Nikos Mademlis	19 September 1984 (age 41)	19	0	(Hellenic Football Federation) free agent
4	FW	Lazaros Marigkos	5 January 1985 (age 41)	21	0	(Hellenic Football Federation) free agent
8	FW	Dimitris Agrianitis (Vice-captain)	6 April 1982 (age 44)	22	0	(Hellenic Football Federation) free agent

=== Recent call-ups ===
The following footballers were part of a national selection in the last year, but are not part of the current squad.

No.	Pos.	Player	Date of birth (age)	Caps	Goals	Club
	GK	Dimitris Vouvopoulos	18 March 1979 (age 47)	7	0	(Hellenic Football Federation) free agent
	DF	Vasilis Toumaras	25 August 1984 (age 41)	14	0	(Hellenic Football Federation) free agent
	MF	Nikolaos Papakyrgiakis	4 June 1990 (age 36)	13	0	(Hellenic Football Federation) free agent
	MF	Ioannis Vasiadis	9 August 1951 (age 74)	0	0	(Hellenic Football Federation) free agent
	MF	Thanasis Syrmas	12 April 1973 (age 53)	0	0	(Hellenic Football Federation) free agent
	FW	Nikolaos Papaggelis	23 July 1998 (age 27)	0	0	(Hellenic Football Federation) free agent

Notes
^{INJ} = Not part of the current squad due to injury
^{WD} = Withdrew from this squad due to injury
^{PRE} = Preliminary squad / standby

== Coaching and technical staff ==
=== Current staff members ===
As of 26 May 2024.

Position	Name
Head coach	(Greece) Apostolis Baltoumas
Physiotherapist	(Greece) Evangelos Katsakioris
Psychologist	(Greece) Dimitris Petrounias
Technical director	(Greece) Aris Mavropoulos
Logistics manager	(Greece) Panagiotis Kaddas
Equipment manager	(Greece) Stavros Kostopoulos
Equipment assistant	(Greece) Georgios Koumpis

=== Coaching history ===
Updated 5 July 2024

Full name	Years active	Pld	W	D	L	GF	GA	Win %	Major competitions
(Greece) George Iordanidis	2016–2017	5 (Note: Unofficial matches against teams without amputees.)	2	1	2	9	6	40.00%	
(Greece) Apostolis Baltoumas	2017–	35 (Note: Official matches against teams with amputees.)	11	5	19	51	100	31.42%	EAFF Amp Futbol Cup – Winner
Total	2016–present	40	13	6	21	60	106	32.50%	

== Kit providers and sponsors ==
Updated 21 August 2025

Supplier	Period	Sponsor
(Italy) Givova	2016–17	—
(Italy) Legea	2017–21	—
(Spain) Luanvi	2021–25	—
(Germany) Adidas	2025–27	(Denmark) Unisport
