= Amputee Football World Cup =

Athletic competition

- Status: Active
- Genre: Sports event
- Frequency: 4 years
- Years active: 39
- Inaugurated: 1986
- Founder: Bill Barry
- Previous event: 2022
- Next event: 2026
- Participants: 24
- Area: International
- Organiser: World Amputee Football Federation
- Website: https://amputeefootball.org/

The Amputee Football World Cup, or Amputee Soccer World Cup (from 1986 to 1991), Amputee Football World Championship (from 1998 to 2003), is a world championship in amputee football that takes place every four years.

== History ==
The first world championship tournaments (1986-1991) were held under the auspices of Amputee Soccer International, were called the Amputee Soccer World Cup, and were played indoor and outdoor in some years.

1994 Amputee Football World Cup was organized by International Paralympic Committee.

The 1998-2003 tournaments were called the Amputee Football World Championship and were organized by the International Amputee Football Federation.

In 2003 World Amputee Football Federation (WAFF) was formed and took responsibility for Amputee Football World Cup organisation.

The current champion is Turkey who beat Angola 4-1 in the 2022 final.

== Results ==
Number	Year	Date	Host city	Teams	Gold	Silver	Bronze	4th place	Ref.
ASI tournaments
1	1986	27–28 Sep	(United States) Seattle	3 (6)	United States	United States or Canada	Canada or United States	-	
2	1987	5–7 Sep	(United States) Seattle	7	El Salvador	United States	United States or Canada	United States or Canada	
3	1988(i)	3–5 Sep	(United States) Seattle	8	England	El Salvador	United States	Canada	
3	1988(o)	3–5 Sep	(United States) Seattle	5	El Salvador	United States	England	Canada	
4	1989(i)	2–4 Sep	(United States) Seattle	9	England	El Salvador	Brazil	Soviet Union	
4	1989(o)	3–4 Sep	(United States) Seattle	6	El Salvador	England	Brazil	Soviet Union	
5	1990(i)	31 Aug–1 Sep	(United States) Seattle	6	England	Brazil	El Salvador or Soviet Union	Soviet Union or El Salvador	
5	1990(o)	2–3 Sep	(United States) Seattle	6	Soviet Union	El Salvador	Brazil or England	England or Brazil	
6	1991(i)	11–15 Oct	(Uzbekistan) Tashkent	6	Uzbekistan	England	Brazil	El Salvador	
6	1991(o)	16–20 Oct	(Uzbekistan) Tashkent	6	Uzbekistan	El Salvador	Brazil	England	
IPC tournament
7(1)	1994	3–10 Dec	(Russia) Moscow	8	Russia	Uzbekistan	Ukraine	Uzbekistan	
IAFF tournaments
8(1)	1998	4–9 Aug	(England) Crewe	6	Russia	Uzbekistan	Brazil	England	
9(2)	2000	13–18 Nov	(United States) Seattle	6	Brazil	Russia	Ukraine	Uzbekistan	
10(3)	2001	5–10 Nov	(Brazil) Rio de Janeiro	6	Brazil	Russia	England	Ukraine	
11(4)	2002	5–11 Sep	(Russia) Sochi	6	Russia	Brazil	Uzbekistan	England	
12(5)	2003	3–7 Oct	(Uzbekistan) Tashkent	4	Russia	Ukraine	Brazil	Uzbekistan	
WAFF tournaments
13(1)	2005	13–21 Aug	(Brazil) Niterói	6	Brazil	Russia	England	Ukraine	
14(2)	2007	12–20 Nov	(Turkey) Antalya	10	Uzbekistan	Russia	Turkey	Brazil	
15(3)	2010	16–24 Oct	(Argentina) Crespo	15	Uzbekistan	Argentina	Turkey	Russia	
16(4)	2012	7–14 Oct	(Russia) Kaliningrad	12	Uzbekistan	Russia	Turkey	Argentina	
17(5)	2014	30 Nov–8 Dec	(Mexico) Culiacán	20	Russia	Angola	Turkey	Poland	
18(6)	2018	27 Oct–4 Nov	(Mexico) San Juan de los Lagos	22	Angola	Turkey	Brazil	Mexico	
19(7)	2022	30 Sep–9 Oct	(Turkey) Istanbul	24	Turkey	Angola	Uzbekistan	Haiti	
20(8)	2026	13–22 Nov	(Mexico) San Juan de los Lagos	24					

== Women's Cup ==
The first Women's Amputee World Cup was held in 2024.

Number	Year	Date	Host city	Teams	Gold	Silver	Bronze	4th place	Ref.
1	2024	4–10 November	(Colombia) Barranquilla	10	Colombia	United States	Poland	Kenya	
2	2027		(Poland) Kraków						

== Medals ==
=== Men's ===
Rank	Nation	Gold	Silver	Bronze	Total
1	Russia	5	5	0	10
2	Uzbekistan	5	2	2	9
3	El Salvador	3	4	0	7
4	Brazil	3	2	7	12
5	England	3	2	3	8
6	United States	1	2	1	4
7	Angola	1	2	0	3
8	Turkey	1	1	4	6
9	Soviet Union	1	0	0	1
10	Ukraine	0	1	2	3
11	Argentina	0	1	0	1
Totals (11 entries)		23	22	19	64

‡ In some seasons, silver and bronze medalists have not yet been determined due to a lack of game results:
1986 - silver and bronze (USA or Canada);
1987 - bronze (USA or Canada);
1990 (indoor) - bronze (El Salvador or Soviet Union);
1990 (outdoor) - bronze (Brazil or England).

=== Women's ===
Rank	Nation	Gold	Silver	Bronze	Total
1	Colombia	1	0	0	1
2	United States	0	1	0	1
3	Poland	0	0	1	1
Totals (3 entries)		1	1	1	3

== See also ==
- Amputee football
- European Amputee Football Championship
- EAFF Nations League
- African Amputee Football Cup of Nations
- Amputee Football Cup of America
