= 2026 Amputee Football World Cup =

2026 sporting event

Tournament details
- Host country: Mexico
- City: San Juan de los Lagos
- Dates: 13–22 November 2026
- Teams: 24 (from World Amputee Football Federation confederations) (from multiple associations)

The 2026 Amputee Football World Cup is the 20th edition of the biannual international competition of amputee football national men's teams. It was organized by the World Amputee Football Federation (WAFF) and was held in San Juan de los Lagos, Mexico. The previous event took place in Turkey in 2022.

== Planning ==
In 2025, it was reported the competition would be held in Costa Rica. It was later rescheduled for Mexico. The England team reportedly may not afford to compete.

== Qualified teams ==
Means of qualification	Date(s)	Venue(s)	Berth(s)	Qualified
Host nation	—N/a	—N/a	1	Mexico
2025 Amputee Football Gold Cup	8–12 July 2025	Mexico	2	Costa Rica; United States
2025 EAFF Nations League	12 September–2 November 2025	France	7	England; Germany (Note: Germany qualified via European continental rankings/championship performance (Group C).); Italy; Poland; Spain; Turkey; Ukraine (Note: Ukrain 2025 EAFF Nations League Division C champions; replaced Ireland in September 2026 (Group C).)
2024 African Amputee Football Cup of Nations	18–27 May 2024	Egypt	7	Algeria; Angola; Egypt; Ghana; Liberia; Morocco; Nigeria
2025 South American Amputee Football Championship	25–30 August 2025	Brazil	3	Brazil; Colombia; Uruguay
2025 Asian Amputee Football Cup	9–15 November 2025	Indonesia	4	Iran; Iraq; Japan; Uzbekistan
Total			24	

== Venues ==
The 2026 WAFF Amputee Football World Cup is hosted in San Juan de los Lagos, in the state of Jalisco, Mexico, running from 13 to 22 November 2026. All matches take place across three local sports complexes featuring four total pitches.

- Campo de Fútbol Proan en San Martín: Located at Malecón Sur 97 in the Santa Lucía neighborhood, this is the primary tournament stadium. It hosted the opening ceremony and opening match, and it will host the World Cup final.
- Santa Lucía Stadium (Canchas Proan): Situated at San Miguel 11 in Santa Lucía, this facility provides two side-by-side pitches designated as Santa Lucía 1 and Santa Lucía 2. Both fields host concurrent group stage and placement matches throughout the week.
- Campo de Fútbol Lomas Verdes: Located in the Colonia Santa Cecilia area, this venue serves as the fourth tournament pitch. It hosts group stage fixtures and classification knockout rounds.

2026 Amputee Football World Cup is located in Mexico
San Juan de los Lagos
Campo de Fútbol Proan en San Martín	Santa Lucía Stadium (Canchas Proan)	Campo de Fútbol Lomas Verdes
Capacity:	Capacity:	Capacity: 1,000

== Final draw ==
The draw was held on 26 September 2026 in San Juan de los Lagos at 11:00 UTC-6.

=== Seeding ===
The 24 teams were drawn into six groups of four teams, with the host Mexico automatically seeded to Pot 1 and placed into the first position of Group A.

Pot 1	Pot 2	Pot 3	Pot 4
Mexico (hosts); Turkey; Angola; Brazil; England; Uzbekistan	Morocco; Italy; Poland; Japan; Spain; Colombia	Iran; Liberia; Ghana; United States; Germany; Nigeria	Uruguay; Iraq; Ukraine; Egypt; Algeria; Costa Rica

== Match officials ==
The following officials were chosen for the tournament.

Confederation	Referees
NCACAFF (North, Central America and Caribbean)	(Costa Rica) Allan Vásquez
NCACAFF (North, Central America and Caribbean)	(Mexico) José Miguel Gallardo Aguirre
NCACAFF (North, Central America and Caribbean)	(Mexico) Juan José Gutiérrez León
NCACAFF (North, Central America and Caribbean)	(Mexico) Alfredo Martínez
NCACAFF (North, Central America and Caribbean)	(Mexico) Jesús Alonso Morales Casillas
NCACAFF (North, Central America and Caribbean)	(Mexico) Luis Javier Reynoso Zamarripa
NCACAFF (North, Central America and Caribbean)	(Mexico) Ricardo Zavala
NCACAFF (North, Central America and Caribbean)	(United States) Robert Baldwin
CONSFA (South America)	(Brazil) Jesse Santana
CONSFA (South America)	(Chile) Nicolás Boin
CONSFA (South America)	(Colombia) Osnaider Mariano Galindo
CONSFA (South America)	(Uruguay) Leticia Rodríguez Murro

Confederation	Referees
CAAF (Africa)	(Tanzania) Shabani Msangi
AAFC (Asia)	(Iraq) Muhamed Tariq Khyara
AAFC (Asia)	(Malaysia) Mohd Akram Azman
EAFF (Europe)	(England) Owen Radley
EAFF (Europe)	(France) Cédric Nemery
EAFF (Europe)	(France) Frédéric Ortiz
EAFF (Europe)	(Germany) Mario Schmidt
EAFF (Europe)	(Republic of Ireland) Claudiu Cimpoesu
EAFF (Europe)	(Poland) Adrian Kozieł
EAFF (Europe)	(Poland) Paveł Susek
EAFF (Europe)	(Poland) Agnieszka Szybińska
EAFF (Europe)	(Spain) Miguel Ángel Moreno
EAFF (Europe)	(Turkey) Şehmus Ünverdi
EAFF (Europe)	(Turkey) Selahattin Yıldız

== Group stage ==
All times are local, MET (UTC-6).

=== Group A ===
Pos	Team	Pld	W	D	L	GF	GA	GD	Pts	Qualification
1	Mexico (H)	3	2	1	0	6	2	+4	7	Knockout stage
2	Algeria	3	1	2	0	4	1	+3	5	Knockout stage
3	Italy	3	1	1	1	5	3	+2	4	Knockout stage
4	Liberia	3	0	0	3	0	9	−9	0	Withdrew

Source: WAFF
(H) Hosts

=== Group B ===
Pos	Team	Pld	W	D	L	GF	GA	GD	Pts	Qualification
1	Turkey	3	2	1	0	6	2	+4	7	Knockout stage
2	Spain	3	1	2	0	3	2	+1	5	Knockout stage
3	Egypt	3	1	1	1	4	4	0	4	Knockout stage
4	Nigeria	3	0	0	3	1	6	−5	0	

Source: WAFF

=== Group C ===
Pos	Team	Pld	W	D	L	GF	GA	GD	Pts	Qualification
1	Brazil	3	3	0	0	9	1	+8	9	Knockout stage
2	Japan	3	2	0	1	4	2	+2	6	Knockout stage
3	Germany	3	1	0	2	1	7	−6	3	
4	Ukraine	3	0	0	3	0	4	−4	0	

Source: WAFF

=== Group D ===
Pos	Team	Pld	W	D	L	GF	GA	GD	Pts	Qualification
1	Angola	3	2	1	0	4	0	+4	7	Knockout stage
2	Ghana	3	1	1	1	7	3	+4	4	Knockout stage
3	Colombia	3	1	1	1	3	3	0	4	Knockout stage
4	Iraq	3	0	1	2	0	8	−8	1	

Source: WAFF

=== Group E ===
Pos	Team	Pld	W	D	L	GF	GA	GD	Pts	Qualification
1	Morocco	3	3	0	0	8	2	+6	9	Knockout stage
2	United States	3	2	0	1	7	4	+3	6	Knockout stage
3	Uruguay	3	1	0	2	3	8	−5	3	
4	Uzbekistan	3	0	0	3	1	5	−4	0	

Source: WAFF

=== Group F ===
Pos	Team	Pld	W	D	L	GF	GA	GD	Pts	Qualification
1	England	3	2	1	0	5	1	+4	7	Knockout stage
2	Poland	3	2	0	1	5	2	+3	6	Knockout stage
3	Costa Rica	3	1	1	1	5	3	+2	4	Knockout stage
4	Iran	3	0	0	3	0	9	−9	0	Withdrew

Source: WAFF

=== Ranking of third-placed teams ===
The four best third-placed teams from the six groups advance to the knockout stage along with the six group winners and six runners-up.

Pos	Grp	Team	Pld	W	D	L	GF	GA	GD	Pts	Qualification
1	A	Italy	3	1	1	1	5	3	+2	4	Knockout stage
2	F	Costa Rica	3	1	1	1	5	3	+2	4	Knockout stage
3	B	Egypt	3	1	1	1	4	4	0	4	Knockout stage
4	D	Colombia	3	1	1	1	3	3	0	4	Knockout stage
5	E	Uruguay	3	1	0	2	3	8	−5	3	
6	C	Germany	3	1	0	2	1	7	−6	3	

Source: WAFF

== Knockout stage ==
=== Bracket ===
Round of 16
18 November – S.J. de los Lagos
Brazil	4
Costa Rica	1
18 November – S.J. de los Lagos
Algeria	0
Spain (ab) (Note: The Algerian team walked off the pitch and withdrew from their Round of 16 match against Spain in protest of the referee's decisions. The match official awarded three consecutive penalty kicks to Spain within the first 13 minutes of play. The Algerian team abandoned the match around the 15 minute mark. The score was 2-0 but was awarded 3-0 by the WAFF.)	3
18 November – S.J. de los Lagos
Morocco	4
Italy	1
18 November – S.J. de los Lagos
Angola	2
Poland	1
18 November – S.J. de los Lagos
England	1
Egypt	2
18 November – S.J. de los Lagos
Ghana	3
United States	1
18 November – S.J. de los Lagos
Turkey	4
Colombia	2
18 November – S.J. de los Lagos
Mexico	1
Japan	2

Quarter-finals
19 November – S.J. de los Lagos
Brazil	2
Spain	0
19 November – S.J. de los Lagos
Morocco	4
Angola	1
19 November – S.J. de los Lagos
Egypt	0
Ghana	2
19 November – S.J. de los Lagos
Turkey	4
Japan	1

Semi-finals
20 November – S.J. de los Lagos
Brazil	1
Morocco	2
20 November – S.J. de los Lagos
Ghana	1 (4)
Turkey	1 (3)

Final
22 November – S.J. de los Lagos
Morocco
Ghana
Third place match
22 November – S.J. de los Lagos
Brazil
Turkey
