= 2005 Amputee Football World Cup =

Tournament details
- Host country: Brazil
- City: Niterói
- Dates: 13–21 August
- Teams: 6

Final positions
- Champions: Brazil (3rd title)
- Runners-up: Russia
- Third place: England
- Fourth place: Ukraine

Tournament statistics
- Matches played: 19
- Goals scored: 73 (3.84 per match)

The 2005 Amputee Football World Cup was the 13th edition of the biennial international competition of amputee football national men's teams. It was organized by the World Amputee Football Federation (WAFF), and was held in Niterói, Brazil between 13 and 21 August 2005.

Brazil won the title for the third time, defeating Russia in the final. England became bronze medalist before Ukraine.

== Participating nations ==
Following six nations competed in the preliminary round-robin tournament. Top four of them qualified for the knockout stage.

- Brazil
- England
- Russia
- Sierra Leone
- Turkey
- Ukraine

== Preliminary round ==
Team	Pld	W	D	L	GF	GA	GD	P
Russia	5	4	0	1	22	6	+16	12
England	5	4	0	1	10	2	+8	12
Brazil	5	3	1	1	17	2	+15	10
Ukraine	5	2	1	2	7	5	+2	7
Sierra Leone	5	0	1	4	2	22	-20	1
Turkey	5	0	1	4	1	22	-21	1

13 August 2005
11:00 GMT-3	Brazil	(Brazil)	0 – 0	(Ukraine)	Ukraine
12:00 GMT-3	Turkey	(Turkey)	0 – 3	(England)	England
15:30 GMT-3	Sierra Leone	(Sierra Leone)	0 – 6	(Russia)	Russia
14 August 2005
09:00 GMT-3	England	(England)	5 – 0	(Sierra Leone)	Sierra Leone
14:30 GMT-3	Russia	(Russia)	4 – 2	(Ukraine)	Ukraine
15 August 2005
09:00 GMT-3	Turkey	(Turkey)	0 – 10	(Russia)	Russia
14:30 GMT-3	Brazil	(Brazil)	0 – 1	(England)	England
16 August 2005
09:00 GMT-3	England	(England)	0 – 2	(Russia)	Russia
14:30 GMT-3	Sierra Leone	(Sierra Leone)	0 – 2	(Ukraine)	Ukraine
17 August 2005
09:00 GMT-3	Turkey	(Turkey)	1 – 1	(Sierra Leone)	Sierra Leone
14:30 GMT-3	Brazil	(Brazil)	4 – 0	(Russia)	Russia
18 August 2005
09:00 GMT-3	England	(England)	1 – 0	(Ukraine)	Ukraine
14:30 GMT-3	Brazil	(Brazil)	5 – 0	(Turkey)	Turkey
19 August 2005
09:00 GMT-3	Turkey	(Turkey)	0 – 3	(Ukraine)	Ukraine
14:30 GMT-3	Brazil	(Brazil)	8 – 1	(Sierra Leone)	Sierra Leone

== Knockout stage ==
Semi-finals
1	Russia	3
4	Ukraine	0
2	England	1
3	Brazil	6

Gold medal
1	Russia	1
3	Brazil	2
Bronze medal
4	Ukraine	0
2	England	1

Semi-finals

20 August 2005
15:30 GMT-3	England	(England)	1 – 6	(Brazil)	Brazil
16:30 GMT-3	Russia	(Russia)	3 – 0	(Ukraine)	Ukraine

3rd place

21 August 2005
09:30 GMT-3	Ukraine	(Ukraine)	0 – 1	(England)	England

Final

21 August 2005
10:30 GMT-3	Russia	(Russia)	1 – 2	(Brazil)	Brazil

== Rankings ==
Rank	Team
1	Brazil
2	Russia
3	England
4	Ukraine
5	Sierra Leone
6	Turkey

2005 Amputee Football World Cup

Brazil
Third title
