= Amputee football at the 2023 African Para Games =

- Venue: McDan La Town Park Stadium
- Location: Accra, Ghana
- Dates: 4–10 September 2024
- Nations: 8

Medalists
gold medal	Ghana
silver medal	Morocco
bronze medal	Egypt

Amputee football at the 2023 African Para Games was held at the McDan La Town Park Stadium in Accra.

== Participating teams ==
- Angola
- Egypt
- Ghana (hosts)
- Kenya
- Liberia
- Morocco
- Rwanda
- Uganda

== Schedule ==
G	Group stage	C	Classification matches	½	Semi-finals	B	Bronze medal match	F	Final

Date Event	Sun 3 Sep	Mon 4 Sep	Tue 5 Sep	Wed 6 Sep	Thu 7 Sep	Fri 8 Sep	Sat 9 Sep		Sun 10 Sep		Mon 11 Sep	Tue 12 Sep
Men's tournament		G	G	G	G		C (5-6th) (7-8th)	½	B	F		

== Medalists ==
Event	Gold	Silver	Bronze
Men's team	Ghana	Morocco	Egypt

== Medal standings ==
Rank	Nation	Gold	Silver	Bronze	Total
1	Ghana (GHA)	1	0	0	1
2	Morocco (MAR)	0	1	0	1
3	Egypt (EGY)	0	0	1	1
Totals (3 entries)		1	1	1	3

== Group stage ==
=== Group A ===
Pos	Team	Pld	W	D	L	GF	GA	GD	Pts	Qualification
1	Morocco	3	3	0	0	8	1	+7	9	Semi finals
2	Ghana	3	2	0	1	13	2	+11	6	Semi finals
3	Liberia	3	0	1	2	1	9	−8	1	5th–6th place match
4	Uganda	3	0	1	2	1	11	−10	1	7th–8th place match

4 September 2023
19:00

Ghana	7–0	Uganda

Accra
5 September 2023
19:00

Liberia	0–3	Morocco

Accra

6 September 2023
17:30

Liberia	1–1	Uganda

Accra
6 September 2023
19:00

Ghana	1–2	Morocco

Accra

7 September 2023
17:30

Morocco	3–0	Uganda

Accra
7 September 2023
19:00

Ghana	5–0	Liberia

Accra

=== Group B ===
Pos	Team	Pld	W	D	L	GF	GA	GD	Pts	Qualification
1	Egypt	3	3	0	0	9	4	+5	9	Semi finals
2	Angola	3	2	0	1	9	6	+3	6	Semi finals
3	Rwanda	3	1	0	2	5	8	−3	3	5th–6th place match
4	Kenya	3	0	0	3	4	9	−5	0	7th–8th place match

4 September 2023
16:00

Angola	1–3	Egypt

Accra
5 September 2023
16:00

Kenya	1–2	Rwanda

Accra

6 September 2023
14:00

Kenya	1–2	Egypt

Accra
6 September 2023
16:00

Angola	3–1	Rwanda

Accra

7 September 2023
14:00

Egypt	4–2	Rwanda

Accra
7 September 2023
16:00

Angola	5–2	Kenya

Accra

== Knockout stage ==
=== Bracket ===
Semi-finals
9 September
Morocco	4
Angola	2
9 September
Ghana (a.e.t.)	2
Egypt	1

Gold medal match
10 September
Morocco	1
Ghana	2
Bronze medal match
10 September
Angola	2
Egypt	4

=== 7th–8th classification matches ===
9 September 2023
14:00

Uganda	0–3	Kenya

McDan La Town Park Stadium, Accra

=== 5th–6th classification matches ===
9 September 2023
16:00

Liberia	0–2	Rwanda

McDan La Town Park Stadium, Accra

=== Semi-finals ===
9 September 2023
17:30

Morocco	4–2	Angola

McDan La Town Park Stadium, Accra

9 September 2023
19:00

Ghana	2–1 (a.e.t.)	Egypt

McDan La Town Park Stadium, Accra

=== Bronze medal match ===
10 September 2023
16:00

Angola	2–4 (a.e.t.)	Egypt

McDan La Town Park Stadium, Accra

=== Gold medal match ===
9 September 2023
19:00

Morocco	1–2	Ghana

McDan La Town Park Stadium, Accra

== Final rankings ==
Rank	Team
Gold medal	Ghana
Silver medal	Morocco
Bronze medal	Egypt
4	Angola
5	Rwanda
6	Liberia
7	Kenya
8	Uganda

== Awards ==
- Best Player: (Ghana) Mohamed Mubarik
- Best Goalkeeper: (Ghana) Razak Sieda
- Top Scorer Player: (Egypt) Zaher Mohamed
- Best Fairplay Team: Uganda
- Best Coach: (Ghana) Steven Richard Obeng
- Best Referee: (Ghana) Joshua Sylvanus
