= 2002 Amputee Football World Championship =

2002 Amputee Football World Cup
Tournament details
- Host country: Russia
- City: Sochi
- Dates: 5–11 September
- Teams: 6

Final positions
- Champions: Russia (3rd title)
- Runners-up: Brazil
- Third place: Uzbekistan
- Fourth place: England

Tournament statistics
- Matches played: 19
- Goals scored: 99 (5.21 per match)

The 2002 Amputee Football World Cup was the 11th edition of the annual international competition of amputee football national men's teams. It was organized by the International Amputee Football Federation (IAFF), and was held in Sochi, Russia between 5 and 11 September 2002.

Russia won the title for the second time, defeating Brazil in the final. Uzbekistan became bronze medalist before England.

== Participating nations ==
Following six nations competed in the preliminary round-robin tournament. The first four ranking teams qualified for the knockout stage.

- Brazil
- England
- Moldova
- Russia
- Ukraine
- Uzbekistan

== Preliminary round ==
Team	Pld	W	D	L	GF	GA	GD	P
Russia	5	4	1	0	32	1	+31	13
Uzbekistan	5	3	1	1	25	6	+19	10
Brazil	5	2	3	0	16	2	+14	9
England	5	2	1	2	7	8	-1	7
Ukraine	5	1	0	4	10	13	-3	3
Moldova	5	0	0	5	1	61	-60	0

5 September 2002
	Brazil	(Brazil)	5 – 0	(Ukraine)	Ukraine
	England	(England)	1 – 3	(Uzbekistan)	Uzbekistan
	Russia	(Russia)	21 – 0	(Moldova)	Moldova
6 September 2002
	Russia	(Russia)	0 – 0	(Brazil)	Brazil
	England	(England)	2 – 1	(Ukraine)	Ukraine
	Uzbekistan	(Uzbekistan)	19 – 0	(Moldova)	Moldova
7 September 2002
	Russia	(Russia)	3 – 0	(Uzbekistan)	Uzbekistan
	Brazil	(Brazil)	0 – 0	(England)	England
	Ukraine	(Ukraine)	7 – 0	(Moldova)	Moldova
8 September 2002
	Russia	(Russia)	4 – 1	(Ukraine)	Ukraine
	Brazil	(Brazil)	1 – 1	(Uzbekistan)	Uzbekistan
	England	(England)	4 – 0	(Moldova)	Moldova
9 September 2002
	Ukraine	(Ukraine)	1 – 2	(Uzbekistan)	Uzbekistan
	Russia	(Russia)	4 – 0	(England)	England
	Brazil	(Brazil)	10 – 1	(Moldova)	Moldova

== Knockout stage ==
Semi-finals
1	Russia	5
4	England	0
2	Uzbekistan	0
3	Brazil	1

Gold medal
1	Russia	1
3	Brazil	0
Bronze medal
4	England	0
2	Uzbekistan	1

Semi-finals

10 September 2002
	Russia	(Russia)	5 – 0	(England)	England
	Uzbekistan	(Uzbekistan)	0 – 1 (a.e.t.)	(Brazil)	Brazil

3rd place

11 September 2002
	England	(England)	0 – 1 (a.e.t.)	(Uzbekistan)	Uzbekistan

Final

11 September 2002
	Russia	(Russia)	1 – 0 (a.e.t.)	(Brazil)	Brazil

== Rankings ==
Rank	Team
1	Russia
2	Brazil
3	Uzbekistan
4	England
5	Ukraine
6	Moldova

2002 Amputee Football World Cup

Russia
Third title
