= 2000 Amputee Football World Cup =

Tournament details
- Host country: United States
- City: Seattle
- Dates: 13–18 November
- Teams: 6
- Venue: 2

Final positions
- Champions: Brazil (1st title)
- Runners-up: Russia
- Third place: Ukraine
- Fourth place: Uzbekistan

Tournament statistics
- Matches played: 16
- Goals scored: 99 (6.19 per match)
- Best player: (Uzbekistan) Azziz

The 2000 Amputee Football World Cup was the 9th edition of the annual international competition of amputee football national men's teams. It was organized by the International Amputee Football Federation (IAFF), and was held in Seattle, United States between 13 and 18 November 2000.

Brazil won the title for the first time, defeating Russia in the final. Ukraine became bronze medalist before Uzbekistan.

== Participating nations ==
Following six nations competed in the preliminary round-robin tournament. The first two ranking teams qualified for the Gold medal match.

- Brazil
- England
- Russia
- United States
- Ukraine
- Uzbekistan

== Preliminary round ==
Team	Pld	W	D	L	GF	GA	GD	P
Russia	5	5	0	0	33	6	+27	15
Brazil	5	3	1	1	18	6	+12	10
Ukraine	5	2	2	1	16	9	+7	8
Uzbekistan	5	2	0	3	17	12	+5	6
England	5	1	1	3	11	7	+4	4
United States	5	0	0	5	1	56	-55	0

13 November 2000
10:15 PST	Brazil	(Brazil)	4 – 1	(Uzbekistan)	Uzbekistan	Arena Sports
11:30 PST	Russia	(Russia)	2 – 0	(England)	England	Arena Sports
12:45 PST	Ukraine	(Ukraine)	11 – 0	(United States)	United States	Arena Sports
14 November 2000
10:15 PST	Russia	(Russia)	4 – 3	(Uzbekistan)	Uzbekistan	Arena Sports
11:30 PST	England	(England)	0 – 0	(Ukraine)	Ukraine	Arena Sports
12:45 PST	Brazil	(Brazil)	8 – 0	(United States)	United States	Arena Sports
15 November 2000
10:15 PST	England	(England)	1 – 3	(Brazil)	Brazil	Arena Sports
11:30 PST	United States	(United States)	1 – 9	(Uzbekistan)	Uzbekistan	Arena Sports
12:45 PST	Russia	(Russia)	6 – 1	(Ukraine)	Ukraine	Arena Sports
16 November 2000
10:15 PST	Brazil	(Brazil)	1 – 1	(Ukraine)	Ukraine	Arena Sports
11:30 PST	Uzbekistan	(Uzbekistan)	2 – 0	(England)	England	Arena Sports
12:45 PST	Russia	(Russia)	18 – 0	(United States)	United States	Arena Sports
17 November 2000
18:00 PST	Brazil	(Brazil)	2 – 3	(Russia)	Russia	Mercer Arena
19:00 PST	Ukraine	(Ukraine)	3 – 2	(Uzbekistan)	Uzbekistan	Mercer Arena
20:00 PST	United States	(United States)	0 – 10	(England)	England	Mercer Arena

== Gold medal match ==
18 November 2000
14:00 PST	Brazil	(Brazil)	2 – 1 (a.e.t.)	(Russia)	Russia	Mercer Arena

== Rankings ==
Rank	Team
1	Brazil
2	Russia
3	Ukraine
4	Uzbekistan
5	England
6	United States

2000 Amputee Football World Cup

Brazil
First title

== Exhibition matches ==
13 November 2000
	United States	(United States)	4 – 1	(United States)	Able-bodied team	Arena Sports
18 November 2000
12:00 PST	Uzbekistan	(Uzbekistan)	4 – 1	(Moldova)	Moldova	Mercer Arena
13:00 PST	United States	(United States)	0 – 5	(England)	England	Mercer Arena
