= 2010 Amputee Football World Cup =

Tournament details
- Host country: Argentina
- City: Crespo
- Dates: 16–24 October
- Teams: 15
- Venue: 4 (in 4 host cities)

Final positions
- Champions: Uzbekistan (4th title)
- Runners-up: Argentina
- Third place: Turkey
- Fourth place: Russia

Tournament statistics
- Matches played: 47
- Goals scored: 147 (3.13 per match)

The 2010 Amputee Football World Cup was the 15th edition of the biennial international competition of amputee football national men's teams. It was organized by the World Amputee Football Federation (WAFF), and was held in Crespo, Argentina between 16 and 24 October 2007.

Uzbekistan won the title for the fourth time, defeating Argentina in the final. Turkey became bronze medalist before Russia.

== Participating nations ==
Following 15 nations competed in the preliminary round in four groups. Nigeria did not arrive.

Top two teams from each group qualified for the second round, where they competed in two quarter-final groups. The top two teams from these groups advanced to the semifinals.

- Angola
- Argentina
- Brazil
- El Salvador
- France
- Ghana
- Great Britain
- Haiti
- Iran
- Japan
- Liberia
- Russia
- Turkey
- Ukraine
- Uzbekistan

== Preliminary round ==
=== Group A ===
All matches were played in Crespo.

Team	Pld	W	D	L	GF	GA	GD	P
Argentina	3	2	1	0	13	0	+13	7
Ukraine	3	2	1	0	10	0	+10	7
France	3	1	0	2	7	8	-1	3
Japan	3	0	0	3	0	22	-22	0

16 October 2010
20:30 GMT-3	Argentina	(Argentina)	8 – 0	(Japan)	Japan	Unión de Crespo
22:00 GMT-3	Ukraine	(Ukraine)	3 – 0	(France)	France	Unión de Crespo
17 October 2010
20:00 GMT-3	Japan	(Japan)	0 – 7	(Ukraine)	Ukraine	Unión de Crespo
21:30 GMT-3	Argentina	(Argentina)	5 – 0	(France)	France	Unión de Crespo
18 October 2010
20:00 GMT-3	Japan	(Japan)	0 – 7	(France)	France	Unión de Crespo
21:30 GMT-3	Argentina	(Argentina)	0 – 0	(Ukraine)	Ukraine	Unión de Crespo

=== Group B ===
All matches were played in Paraná.

Team	Pld	W	D	L	GF	GA	GD	P
Uzbekistan	2	1	1	0	1	0	+1	4
Brazil	2	1	0	1	1	1	0	3
Iran	2	0	1	1	0	1	-1	1

18 October 2010
20:00 GMT-3	Brazil	(Brazil)	1 – 0	(Iran)	Iran	Don Bosco de Paraná
19 October 2010
10:30 GMT-3	Uzbekistan	(Uzbekistan)	1 – 0	(Brazil)	Brazil	Don Bosco de Paraná
20:00 GMT-3	Uzbekistan	(Uzbekistan)	0 – 0	(Iran)	Iran	Don Bosco de Paraná

=== Group C ===
All matches were played in Cerrito.

Team	Pld	W	D	L	GF	GA	GD	P
Turkey	3	2	1	0	7	2	+5	7
Ghana	3	1	1	1	3	2	+1	4
El Salvador	3	1	1	1	2	3	-1	4
Liberia	3	0	1	2	0	5	-5	1

17 October 2010
21:00 GMT-3	Turkey	(Turkey)	3 – 0	(Liberia)	Liberia	Unión Agrarios de Cerrito
22:15 GMT-3	El Salvador	(El Salvador)	1 – 0	(Ghana)	Ghana	Unión Agrarios de Cerrito
18 October 2010
20:00 GMT-3	Turkey	(Turkey)	1 – 1	(Ghana)	Ghana	Unión Agrarios de Cerrito
21:30 GMT-3	El Salvador	(El Salvador)	0 – 0	(Liberia)	Liberia	Unión Agrarios de Cerrito
19 October 2010
20:00 GMT-3	Ghana	(Ghana)	2 – 0	(Liberia)	Liberia	Unión Agrarios de Cerrito
21:30 GMT-3	Turkey	(Turkey)	3 – 1	(El Salvador)	El Salvador	Unión Agrarios de Cerrito

=== Group D ===
All matches were played in Viale.

Team	Pld	W	D	L	GF	GA	GD	P
Russia	3	3	0	0	14	2	+12	9
Great Britain	3	2	0	1	5	6	-1	6
Angola	3	1	0	2	3	4	-1	3
Haiti	3	0	0	3	1	11	-10	0

17 October 2010
20:00 GMT-3	Russia	(Russia)	2 – 1	(Angola)	Angola	Arsenal de Viale
21:30 GMT-3	Great Britain	(United Kingdom)	2 – 1	(Haiti)	Haiti	Arsenal de Viale
18 October 2010
18:30 GMT-3	Great Britain	(United Kingdom)	1 – 5	(Russia)	Russia	Arsenal de Viale
20:00 GMT-3	Angola	(Angola)	2 – 0	(Haiti)	Haiti	Arsenal de Viale
19 October 2010
18:30 GMT-3	Great Britain	(United Kingdom)	2 – 0	(Angola)	Angola	Arsenal de Viale
20:00 GMT-3	Russia	(Russia)	7 – 0	(Haiti)	Haiti	Arsenal de Viale

== Second round ==
=== Group 1 ===
Team	Pld	W	D	L	GF	GA	GD	P
Argentina	3	2	0	1	7	3	+4	6
Turkey	3	1	2	0	4	2	+2	5
Ghana	3	1	1	1	3	7	-4	4
Ukraine	3	0	1	2	1	3	-2	1

20 October 2010
21:30 GMT-3	Argentina	(Argentina)	5 – 0	(Ghana)	Ghana	Unión de Crespo
21:30 GMT-3	Ukraine	(Ukraine)	0 – 0	(Turkey)	Turkey	Unión Agrarios de Cerrito
21 October 2010
21:30 GMT-3	Argentina	(Argentina)	1 – 0	(Ukraine)	Ukraine	Unión Agrarios de Cerrito
21:30 GMT-3	Turkey	(Turkey)	1 – 1	(Ghana)	Ghana	Unión de Crespo
22 October 2010
21:30 GMT-3	Argentina	(Argentina)	1 – 3	(Turkey)	Turkey	Unión de Crespo
21:30 GMT-3	Ukraine	(Ukraine)	1 – 2	(Ghana)	Ghana	Unión Agrarios de Cerrito

=== Group 2 ===
Team	Pld	W	D	L	GF	GA	GD	P
Uzbekistan	3	2	1	0	13	6	+7	7
Russia	3	1	2	0	7	3	+4	5
Brazil	3	1	1	1	7	5	+2	4
Great Britain	3	0	0	3	2	15	-13	0

20 October 2010
21:30 GMT-3	Brazil	(Brazil)	0 – 0	(Russia)	Russia	Arsenal de Viale
21:30 GMT-3	Uzbekistan	(Uzbekistan)	6 – 1	(United Kingdom)	Great Britain	Don Bosco de Paraná
21 October 2010
21:30 GMT-3	Russia	(Russia)	4 – 0	(United Kingdom)	Great Britain	Don Bosco de Paraná
21:30 GMT-3	Uzbekistan	(Uzbekistan)	4 – 2	(Brazil)	Brazil	Arsenal de Viale
22 October 2010
21:30 GMT-3	Russia	(Russia)	3 – 3	(Uzbekistan)	Uzbekistan	Arsenal de Viale
21:30 GMT-3	Great Britain	(United Kingdom)	1 – 5	(Brazil)	Brazil	Don Bosco de Paraná

== Knockout stage ==
=== Positions 9-15 ===
Position 9-15
A3	France	0
C4	Liberia	1
C3	El Salvador	4
A4	Japan	0
B3	Iran	3
D4	Haiti	0
D3	Angola	bye
B4

Position 9-12
C4	Liberia	1 (pen.)
C3	El Salvador	1 (pen.)
B3	Iran	0
D3	Angola	3

9th place
C3	El Salvador	0
D3	Angola	3
11th place
C4	Liberia	2
B3	Iran	0

Positions 9-15

20 October 2010
20:00 GMT-3	France	(France)	0 - 1	(Liberia)	Liberia	Unión de Crespo
20:00 GMT-3	El Salvador	(El Salvador)	4 - 0	(Japan)	Japan	Unión Agrarios de Cerrito
20:00 GMT-3	Iran	(Iran)	3 - 0	(Haiti)	Haiti	Arsenal de Viale

13th place

22 October 2010
20:00 GMT-3	France	(France)	3 - 1	(Japan)	Japan	Arsenal de Viale

Positions 9-12

21 October 2010
20:00 GMT-3	Liberia	(Liberia)	1 - 1 (pen.)	(El Salvador)	El Salvador	Arsenal de Viale
20:00 GMT-3	Iran	(Iran)	0 - 3	(Angola)	Angola	Unión de Cerrito

11th place

22 October 2010
20:00 GMT-3	Liberia	(Liberia)	2 - 0	(Iran)	Iran	Unión Agrarios de Cerrito

9th place

22 October 2010
20:00 GMT-3	El Salvador	(El Salvador)	0 - 3	(Angola)	Angola	Unión de Crespo

=== Positions 5-8 ===
7th place

23 October 2007
20:00 GMT-3	Ukraine	(Ukraine)	0 - 2	(United Kingdom)	Great Britain	Unión Agrarios de Cerrito

5th place

23 October 2007
21:30 GMT-3	Ghana	(Ghana)	0 - 2	(Brazil)	Brazil	Unión Agrarios de Cerrito

=== Semi-finals ===
Semifinals
1-1	Argentina	0 (4)
2-2	Russia	0 (1)
2-1	Uzbekistan	2
1-2	Turkey	1

Gold medal
1-1	Argentina	1
2-1	Uzbekistan	3
Bronze medal
2-2	Russia	1
1-2	Turkey	2

Semi-finals

23 October 2010
19:00 GMT-3	Uzbekistan	(Uzbekistan)	2 – 1	(Turkey)	Turkey	Unión de Crespo
20:30 GMT-3	Argentina	(Argentina)	0 – 0 (pen. 4 – 1)	(Russia)	Russia	Unión de Crespo

3rd place

24 October 2010
	Russia	(Russia)	1 – 2	(Turkey)	Turkey	Unión de Crespo

Final

24 October 2010
	Argentina	(Argentina)	1 – 3	(Uzbekistan)	Uzbekistan	Unión de Crespo

== Rankings ==
Rank	Team
1	Uzbekistan
2	Argentina
3	Turkey
4	Russia
5	Brazil
6	Ghana
7	Great Britain
8	Ukraine
9	Angola
10	El Salvador
11	Liberia
12	Iran
13	France
14	Japan
15	Haiti

2010 Amputee Football World Cup

Uzbekistan
Fourth title
