= 2003 Amputee Football World Championship =

2003 Amputee Football World Cup
Tournament details
- Host country: Uzbekistan
- City: Tashkent
- Dates: 3–7 October
- Teams: 4

Final positions
- Champions: Russia (4th title)
- Runners-up: Ukraine
- Third place: Brazil
- Fourth place: Uzbekistan

Tournament statistics
- Matches played: 9
- Goals scored: 35 (3.89 per match)

The 2003 Amputee Football World Cup was the 12th edition of the annual international competition of amputee football national men's teams. It was organized by the International Amputee Football Federation (IAFF), and was held in Tashkent, Uzbekistan between 3 and 7 October 2003.

Russia won the title for the third time, defeating Ukraine in the final. Brazil became bronze medalist before Uzbekistan.

== Participating nations ==
Following four nations competed in the preliminary round-robin tournament. All of them qualified for the knockout stage.

- Brazil
- Russia
- Ukraine
- Uzbekistan

== Preliminary round ==
Team	Pld	W	D	L	GF	GA	GD	P
Uzbekistan	3	2	1	0	7	2	+5	7
Brazil	3	2	1	0	5	1	+4	7
Russia	3	1	0	2	4	5	-1	3
Ukraine	3	0	0	3	1	9	-8	0

3 October 2003
11:00 GMT+5	Russia	(Russia)	0 – 2	(Brazil)	Brazil
12:30 GMT+5	Ukraine	(Ukraine)	1 – 3	(Uzbekistan)	Uzbekistan
4 October 2003
11:00 GMT+5	Ukraine	(Ukraine)	0 – 4	(Russia)	Russia
12:00 GMT+5	Brazil	(Brazil)	1 – 1	(Uzbekistan)	Uzbekistan
5 October 2003
11:00 GMT+5	Ukraine	(Ukraine)	0 – 2	(Brazil)	Brazil
12:00 GMT+5	Uzbekistan	(Uzbekistan)	3 – 0	(Russia)	Russia

== Knockout stage ==
Semi-finals
1	Uzbekistan	1 (3)
4	Ukraine	1 (4)
2	Brazil	1 (3)
3	Russia	1 (4)

Gold medal
4	Ukraine	1
3	Russia	8
Bronze medal
1	Uzbekistan	3
2	Brazil	5

Semi-finals

6 October 2003
11:00 GMT+5	Brazil	(Brazil)	1 – 1 (pen. 3 – 4)	(Russia)	Russia
12:00 GMT+5	Uzbekistan	(Uzbekistan)	1 – 1 (pen. 3 – 4)	(Ukraine)	Ukraine

3rd place

7 October 2003
11:00 GMT+5	Uzbekistan	(Uzbekistan)	3 – 5	(Brazil)	Brazil

Final

7 October 2003
12:00 GMT+5	Ukraine	(Ukraine)	1 – 8	(Russia)	Russia

== Rankings ==
Rank	Team
1	Russia
2	Ukraine
3	Brazil
4	Uzbekistan

2003 Amputee Football World Cup

Russia
Fourth title
