= 2001 Amputee Football World Cup =

Tournament details
- Host country: Brazil
- City: Rio de Janeiro
- Dates: 5–10 November
- Teams: 6

Final positions
- Champions: Brazil (2nd title)
- Runners-up: Russia
- Third place: England
- Fourth place: Ukraine

Tournament statistics
- Matches played: 18
- Goals scored: 96 (5.33 per match)

The 2001 Amputee Football World Cup was the 10th edition of the annual international competition of amputee football national men's teams. It was organized by the International Amputee Football Federation (IAFF), and was held in Rio de Janeiro, Brazil between 5 and 10 November 2001.

Brazil won the title for the second time, defeating Russia in the final. England became bronze medalist before Ukraine.

== Participating nations ==
Following six nations competed in the preliminary round-robin tournament. The first four ranking teams qualified for the knockout stage.

- Argentina
- Brazil
- England
- Russia
- United States
- Ukraine

== Preliminary round ==
Team	Pld	W	D	L	GF	GA	GD	P
Brazil	5	5	0	0	30	2	+28	15
Russia	5	4	0	1	9	4	+5	12
Ukraine	5	2	1	2	16	8	+8	7
England	5	1	2	2	17	6	+11	5
Argentina	5	1	1	3	12	13	-1	4
United States	5	0	0	5	0	51	-51	0

5 November 2001
	Brazil	(Brazil)	5 – 0	(Argentina)	Argentina
	Russia	(Russia)	3 – 0	(England)	England
6 November 2001
	England	(England)	15 – 0	(United States)	United States
	Ukraine	(Ukraine)	2 – 1	(Argentina)	Argentina
	Brazil	(Brazil)	2 – 0	(Russia)	Russia
	Ukraine	(Ukraine)	11 – 0	(United States)	United States
7 November 2001
	Russia	(Russia)	2 – 1	(Ukraine)	Ukraine
	Brazil	(Brazil)	1 – 0	(England)	England
	Argentina	(Argentina)	8 – 0	(United States)	United States
8 November 2001
	Russia	(Russia)	4 – 1	(Argentina)	Argentina
	Brazil	(Brazil)	17 – 0	(United States)	United States
	England	(England)	0 – 0	(Ukraine)	Ukraine
9 November 2001
	England	(England)	2 – 2	(Argentina)	Argentina
	Russia	(Russia)	+ – –	(United States)	United States
	Brazil	(Brazil)	5 – 2	(Ukraine)	Ukraine

== Knockout stage ==
Semi-finals
1	Brazil	3
4	England	0
2	Russia	2(4)
3	Ukraine	2(2)

Gold medal
1	Brazil	2
2	Russia	0
Bronze medal
4	England	2
3	Ukraine	1

Semi-finals

10 November 2001
	Brazil	(Brazil)	3 – 0	(England)	England
	Russia	(Russia)	2 – 2 (pen. 4 – 2)	(Ukraine)	Ukraine

3rd place

10 November 2001
	England	(England)	2 – 1	(Ukraine)	Ukraine

Final

10 November 2001
	Brazil	(Brazil)	2 – 0	(Russia)	Russia

== Rankings ==
Rank	Team
1	Brazil
2	Russia
3	England
4	Ukraine
5	Argentina
6	United States

2001 Amputee Football World Cup

Brazil
Second title
