= 2007 Amputee Football World Cup =

Tournament details
- Host country: Turkey
- City: Antalya
- Dates: 12–20 November
- Teams: 10
- Venue: 2

Final positions
- Champions: Uzbekistan (3rd title)
- Runners-up: Russia
- Third place: Turkey
- Fourth place: Brazil

Tournament statistics
- Matches played: 33
- Goals scored: 138 (4.18 per match)
- Best player: (Russia) Dmitriy Udalov

The 2007 Amputee Football World Cup was the 14th edition of the biennial international competition of amputee football national men's teams. It was organized by the World Amputee Football Federation (WAFF), and was held in Antalya, Turkey between 12 and 20 November 2007.

Uzbekistan won the title for the third time, defeating Russia in the final. Turkey became bronze medalist before Brazil.

== Participating nations ==
Following ten nations competed in the preliminary tournament in two groups. Top four teams of each group qualified for the knockout stage. Nigeria did not arrive due to financial difficulties. Ghana arrived late due to visas difficulties, not permitted to compete.

- Brazil
- England
- France
- Iran
- Liberia
- Russia
- Sierra Leone
- Turkey
- Ukraine
- Uzbekistan

== Preliminary round ==
=== Group A ===
Team	Pld	W	D	L	GF	GA	GD	P
Russia	4	4	0	0	29	3	+26	12
Turkey	4	3	0	1	15	8	+7	9
England	4	2	0	2	13	7	+6	6
Liberia	4	1	0	3	4	14	-10	3
France	4	0	0	4	1	30	-29	0

12 November 2007
10:30 GMT+3	Russia	(Russia)	4 – 2	(England)	England	Orgeneral Aytaç Yalman
13 November 2007
10:30 GMT+3	England	(England)	0 – 2	(Turkey)	Turkey	Gündüz Tekin Onay
11:30 GMT+3	Liberia	(Liberia)	1 – 0	(France)	France	Orgeneral Aytaç Yalman
14 November 2007
10:30 GMT+3	Russia	(Russia)	8 – 0	(Liberia)	Liberia	Orgeneral Aytaç Yalman
13:30 GMT+3	Turkey	(Turkey)	8 – 1	(France)	France	Orgeneral Aytaç Yalman
15 November 2007
10:30 GMT+3	Russia	(Russia)	5 – 1	(Turkey)	Turkey	Gündüz Tekin Onay
12:00 GMT+3	England	(England)	2 – 1	(Liberia)	Liberia	Gündüz Tekin Onay
16 November 2007
10:30 GMT+3	Turkey	(Turkey)	4 – 2	(Liberia)	Liberia	Orgeneral Aytaç Yalman
12:00 GMT+3	England	(England)	9 – 0	(France)	France	Orgeneral Aytaç Yalman
17 November 2007
11:00 GMT+3	Russia	(Russia)	12 – 0	(France)	France	Orgeneral Aytaç Yalman

=== Group B ===
Team	Pld	W	D	L	GF	GA	GD	P
Uzbekistan	4	4	0	0	12	3	+9	12
Brazil	4	3	0	1	13	4	+9	9
Iran	4	2	0	2	9	6	+3	6
Ukraine	4	1	0	3	2	11	-9	3
Sierra Leone	4	0	0	4	1	13	-12	0

12 November 2007
09:30 GMT+3	Brazil	(Brazil)	2 – 4	(Uzbekistan)	Uzbekistan	Gündüz Tekin Onay
11:00 GMT+3	Ukraine	(Ukraine)	2 – 1	(Sierra Leone)	Sierra Leone	Gündüz Tekin Onay
14 November 2007
09:30 GMT+3	Brazil	(Brazil)	3 – 0	(Iran)	Iran	Gündüz Tekin Onay
11:00 GMT+3	Uzbekistan	(Uzbekistan)	3 – 0	(Sierra Leone)	Sierra Leone	Gündüz Tekin Onay
15 November 2007
09:30 GMT+3	Brazil	(Brazil)	4 – 0	(Ukraine)	Ukraine	Orgeneral Aytaç Yalman
11:00 GMT+3	Uzbekistan	(Uzbekistan)	3 – 1	(Iran)	Iran	Orgeneral Aytaç Yalman
16 November 2007
09:30 GMT+3	Ukraine	(Ukraine)	0 – 4	(Iran)	Iran	Gündüz Tekin Onay
12:30 GMT+3	Brazil	(Brazil)	4 – 0	(Sierra Leone)	Sierra Leone	Gündüz Tekin Onay
17 November 2007
09:30 GMT+3	Iran	(Iran)	4 – 2	(Sierra Leone)	Sierra Leone	Gündüz Tekin Onay
10:30 GMT+3	Uzbekistan	(Uzbekistan)	2 – 0	(Ukraine)	Ukraine	Gündüz Tekin Onay

== Knockout stage ==
=== Positions 9-10 ===
9th place

18 November 2007
14:30 GMT+3	France	(France)	1 - 0	(Sierra Leone)	Sierra Leone	Orgeneral Aytaç Yalman

=== Quarterfinals ===
Quarterfinals
A1	Russia	1
B4	Ukraine	0
B2	Brazil	3
A3	England	2
B1	Uzbekistan	7
A4	Liberia	1
A2	Turkey	1
B3	Iran	0

Semifinals
A1	Russia	4
B2	Brazil	0
B1	Uzbekistan	2
A2	Turkey	1

Gold medal
A1	Russia	1
B1	Uzbekistan	2
Bronze medal
B2	Brazil	0
A2	Turkey	1

Positions 5-8
B4	Ukraine	1
A3	England	3
A4	Liberia	0
B3	Iran	4

5th place
A3	England	1
B3	Iran	0
7th place
B4	Ukraine	2
A4	Liberia	1

Quarterfinals

18 November 2007
10:00 GMT+3	Turkey	(Turkey)	1 – 0	(Iran)	Iran	Orgeneral Aytaç Yalman
10:30 GMT+3	Brazil	(Brazil)	3 – 2 (a.e.t.)	(England)	England	Gündüz Tekin Onay
12:00 GMT+3	Russia	(Russia)	1 – 0	(Ukraine)	Ukraine	Orgeneral Aytaç Yalman
12:30 GMT+3	Uzbekistan	(Uzbekistan)	7 – 1	(Liberia)	Liberia	Gündüz Tekin Onay

Positions 5-8

19 November 2007
14:00 GMT+3	Ukraine	(Ukraine)	1 - 3	(England)	England	Gündüz Tekin Onay
14:00 GMT+3	Liberia	(Liberia)	0 - 4	(Iran)	Iran	Orgeneral Aytaç Yalman

7th place

20 November 2007
14:00 GMT+3	Ukraine	(Ukraine)	2 - 1	(Liberia)	Liberia	Orgeneral Aytaç Yalman

5th place

20 November 2007
14:00 GMT+3	England	(England)	1 - 0	(Iran)	Iran	Gündüz Tekin Onay

Semi-finals

19 November 2007
10:00 GMT+3	Uzbekistan	(Uzbekistan)	2 – 1	(Turkey)	Turkey	Orgeneral Aytaç Yalman
12:00 GMT+3	Russia	(Russia)	4 – 0	(Brazil)	Brazil	Gündüz Tekin Onay

3rd place

20 November 2007
09:30 GMT+3	Brazil	(Brazil)	0 – 1	(Turkey)	Turkey	Orgeneral Aytaç Yalman

Final

20 November 2007
11:30 GMT+3	Russia	(Russia)	1 – 2	(Uzbekistan)	Uzbekistan	Gündüz Tekin Onay

== Rankings ==
Rank	Team
1	Uzbekistan
2	Russia
3	Turkey
4	Brazil
5	England
6	Iran
7	Ukraine
8	Liberia
9	France
10	Sierra Leone

2007 Amputee Football World Cup

Uzbekistan
Third title
