= 1994 Amputee Football World Cup =

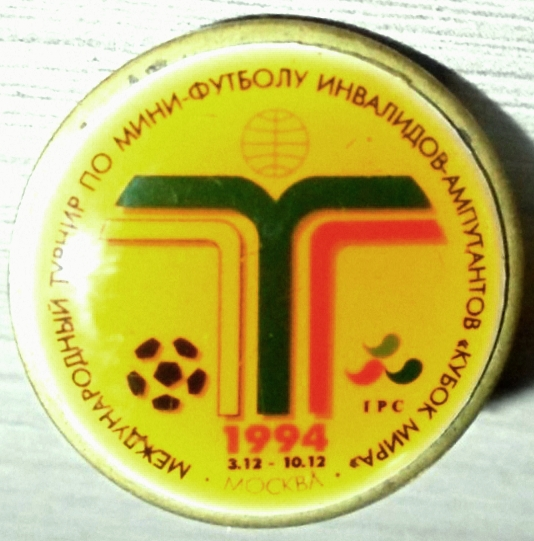
- International Paralympic Committee Amputee Football World Cup 1994

Tournament details
- Host country: Russia
- City: Moscow
- Dates: 3–10 December
- Teams: 8
- Venue: 2

Final positions
- Champions: Russia (1st title)
- Runners-up: Uzbekistan
- Third place: Ukraine
- Fourth place: Uzbekistan

Tournament statistics
- Matches played: 28
- Goals scored: 148 (5.29 per match)
- Best player: (Russia) Matvey Nikitin

The 1994 Amputee Football World Cup was the 7th edition of the annual international competition of amputee football national men's teams. It was organized by the International Paralympic Committee (IPC), and was held in Moscow, Russia between 3 and 10 December 1994. The competition was opened by IOC President Juan Antonio Samaranch. The cup was presented to the winner by IPC Secretary General Andre Reyes.

Russia won the title for the first time, playing draw with Uzbekistan in the last round of round-robin tournament. Ukraine became bronze medalist.

== Participating nations ==
Following four nations competed in the round-robin tournament. Russian Federation was represented by national, national "B", East regions teams, and North Ossetia national team; Uzbekistan and Ukraine - by national and national "B" teams.

- North Ossetia
- Russia
- Ukraine
- Uzbekistan

== Round-robin tournament ==
The competition was held at the CSCA and Dinamo sport complexes. The winner was determined based on the results of a round-robin tournament.

Team	Pld	W	D	L	GF	GA	GD	P
Russia	7	6	1	0	45	3	+42	19
Uzbekistan	7	5	1	1	30	4	+26	16
Ukraine	7	4	2	1	22	5	+17	14
Uzbekistan "B"	7	3	2	2	14	12	+2	11
(Russia) East regions	7	2	1	4	18	13	+5	7
Russia "B"	7	1	4	2	11	15	-4	7
North Ossetia	7	1	1	5	7	29	-22	4
Ukraine "B"	7	0	0	7	1	67	-66	0

3 December 1994
	Russia	(Russia)	2 - 0	(Ukraine)	Ukraine	CSCA Sport Complex
? December 1994
	Uzbekistan	(Uzbekistan)	5 - 1	(Uzbekistan)	Uzbekistan "B"
	East Regions	(Russia)	4 - 0		North Ossetia
	Russia "B"	(Russia)	6 - 0	(Ukraine)	Ukraine "B"
? December 1994
	Russia	(Russia)	4 - 1	(Uzbekistan)	Uzbekistan "B"
	Uzbekistan	(Uzbekistan)	8 - 0		North Ossetia
	Ukraine	(Ukraine)	1 - 1	(Russia)	Russia "B"
	East Regions	(Russia)	12 - 0	(Ukraine)	Ukraine "B"
? December 1994
	Russia	(Russia)	7 - 1	(Russia)	East Regions
	Uzbekistan	(Uzbekistan)	3 - 0	(Russia)	Russia "B"
	Ukraine	(Ukraine)	4 - 0		North Ossetia
	Uzbekistan "B"	(Uzbekistan)	6 - 0	(Ukraine)	Ukraine "B"
? December 1994
	Russia	(Russia)	8 - 1	(Russia)	Russia "B"
	Uzbekistan	(Uzbekistan)	3 - 0	(Russia)	East Regions
	Ukraine	(Ukraine)	12 - 0	(Ukraine)	Ukraine "B"
	Uzbekistan "B"	(Uzbekistan)	3 - 1		North Ossetia
? December 1994
	Russia	(Russia)	8 - 0		North Ossetia
	Uzbekistan	(Uzbekistan)	10 - 0	(Ukraine)	Ukraine "B"
	Ukraine	(Ukraine)	0 - 0	(Uzbekistan)	Uzbekistan "B"
	East Regions	(Russia)	0 - 0	(Russia)	Russia "B"
9 December 1994
	Uzbekistan	(Uzbekistan)	1 - 3	(Ukraine)	Ukraine
? December 1994
	Russia	(Russia)	16 - 0	(Ukraine)	Ukraine "B"
	Uzbekistan "B"	(Uzbekistan)	1 - 0	(Russia)	East Regions
	Russia "B"	(Russia)	1 - 1		North Ossetia
10 December 1994
	Russia	(Russia)	0 - 0	(Uzbekistan)	Uzbekistan
? December 1994
	Ukraine	(Ukraine)	2 - 1	(Russia)	East Regions
	Uzbekistan "B"'	(Uzbekistan)	2 - 2	(Russia)	Russia "B"
	North Ossetia		5 - 1	(Ukraine)	Ukraine "B"

== Rankings ==
Rank	Team
1	Russia
2	Uzbekistan
3	Ukraine
4	Uzbekistan
5	Russia
6	Russia
7	North Ossetia
8	Ukraine

1994 Amputee Football World Cup

Russia
First title
