= 1998 Amputee Football World Cup =

Tournament details
- Host country: England
- City: Crewe
- Dates: 4–9 August
- Teams: 6

Final positions
- Champions: Russia (2nd title)
- Runners-up: Uzbekistan
- Third place: Brazil
- Fourth place: England

Tournament statistics
- Matches played: 20
- Goals scored: 92 (4.6 per match)

The 1998 Amputee Football World Cup was the 8th edition of the annual international competition of amputee football national men's teams. It was organized by the International Amputee Football Federation (IAFF), and was held in Crewe, England between 4 and 9 August 1998.

Russia won the title for the first time, defeating Uzbekistan in the final. Brazil became bronze medalist before England.

== Participating nations ==
Following six nations competed in the preliminary round-robin tournament. The first four ranking teams qualified for the semi-finals.

- Brazil
- England
- Georgia
- Russia
- United States
- Uzbekistan

== Preliminary round ==
Team	Pld	W	D	L	GF	GA	GD	P
Russia	5	5	0	0	25	2	+23	15
Brazil	5	4	0	1	10	3	+7	12
Uzbekistan	5	3	0	2	17	10	+7	9
England	5	2	0	3	15	4	+11	6
Georgia	5	1	0	4	5	21	-16	3
United States	5	0	0	5	1	33	-32	0

4 August 1998
	Russia	(Russia)	10 - 0	(Georgia (country))	Georgia
	Uzbekistan	(Uzbekistan)	1 - 0	(England)	England
5 August 1998
	Russia	(Russia)	1 - 0	(Brazil)	Brazil
	England	(England)	11 - 0	(United States)	United States
	Georgia	(Georgia (country))	4 - 0	(United States)	United States
6 August 1998
	Brazil	(Brazil)	3 - 2	(Uzbekistan)	Uzbekistan
	Russia	(Russia)	1 - 0	(England)	England
	Uzbekistan	(Uzbekistan)	8 - 0	(United States)	United States
	Brazil	(Brazil)	2 - 0	(Georgia (country))	Georgia
7 August 1998
	Uzbekistan	(Uzbekistan)	5 - 0	(Russia)	Georgia
	Brazil	(Brazil)	1 - 0	(England)	England
	Russia	(Russia)	6 - 1	(United States)	United States
8 August 1998
	Brazil	(Brazil)	4 - 0	(United States)	United States
	Russia	(Russia)	7 - 1	(Uzbekistan)	Uzbekistan
	England	(England)	4 - 1	(Georgia (country))	Georgia

== Knockout stage ==
Semi-finals
1	Russia	3
4	England	0
2	Brazil	0
3	Uzbekistan	1

Gold medal
1	Russia	3
3	Uzbekistan	0
Bronze medal
4	England	3
2	Brazil	4

Semi-finals

9 August 1998
	Russia	(Russia)	3 – 0	(England)	England
	Brazil	(Brazil)	0 – 1	(Uzbekistan)	Uzbekistan

5th place

9 August 1998
	Georgia	(Georgia (country))	4 - 1	(United States)	United States

3rd place

9 August 1998
	England	(England)	3 – 4	(Brazil)	Brazil

Final

9 August 1998
	Russia	(Russia)	3 – 0	(Uzbekistan)	Uzbekistan

== Rankings ==
Rank	Team
1	Russia
2	Uzbekistan
3	Brazil
4	England
5	Georgia
6	United States

1998 Amputee Football World Cup

Russia
Second title
