= Team Zaryen =

Disabled soccer football team in Haiti

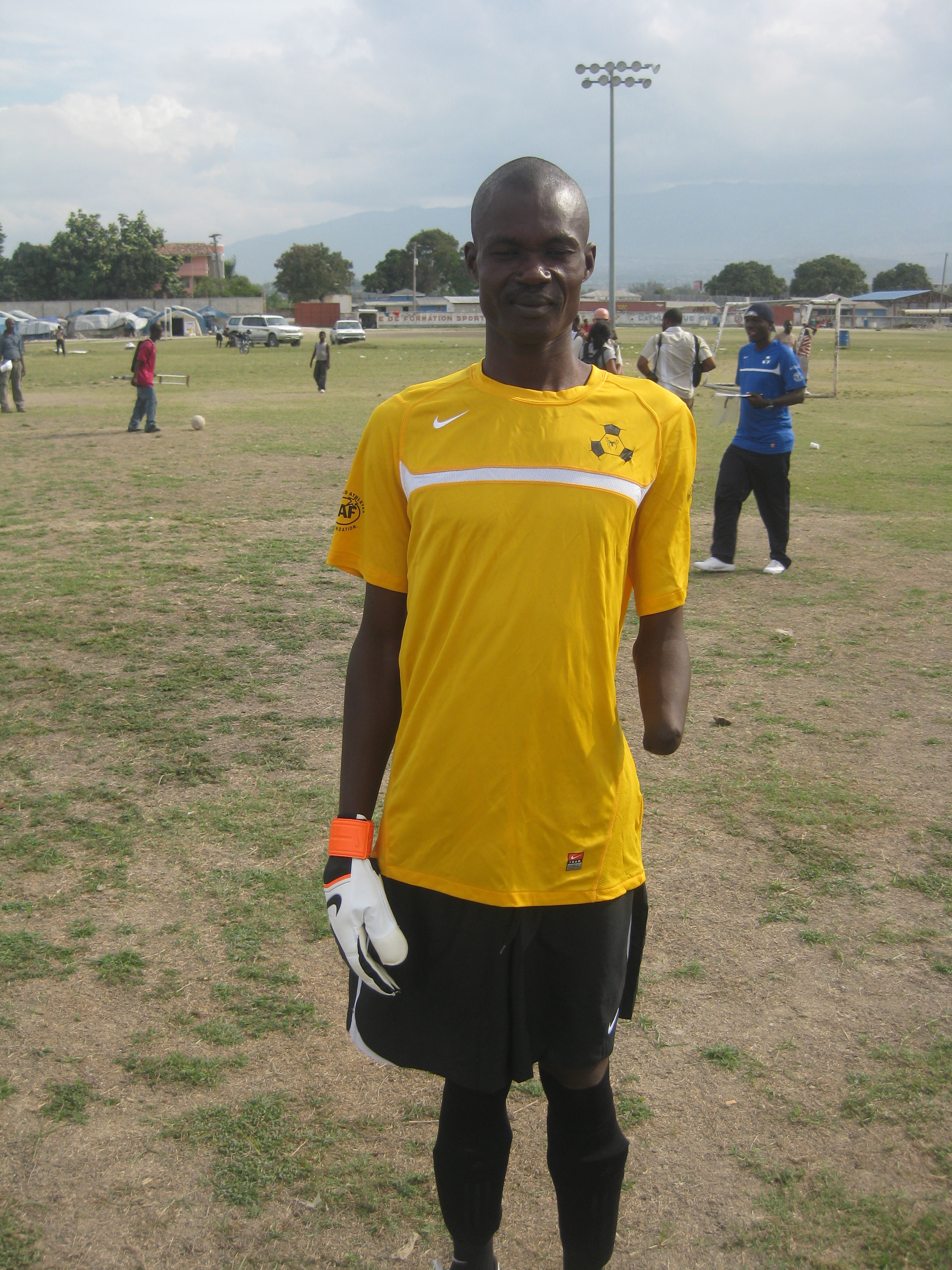
A Zayren goalkeeper

Team Zaryen is a Haitian amputee soccer team in Port-au-Prince, Haiti. Zaryen is the Creole word for Tarantula. The players give two answers when asked why the tarantula was chosen to represent the soccer team. First because when a tarantula attacks, it pursues its enemy slowly and is deadly with just one bite. A tarantula is a spider known to carry on despite the loss of a leg and with the ability to regrow a lost limb. Another reason for the team mascot is because the tarantula has so many legs, much like the appearance of the soccer players with their loftstrand (forearm) crutches.

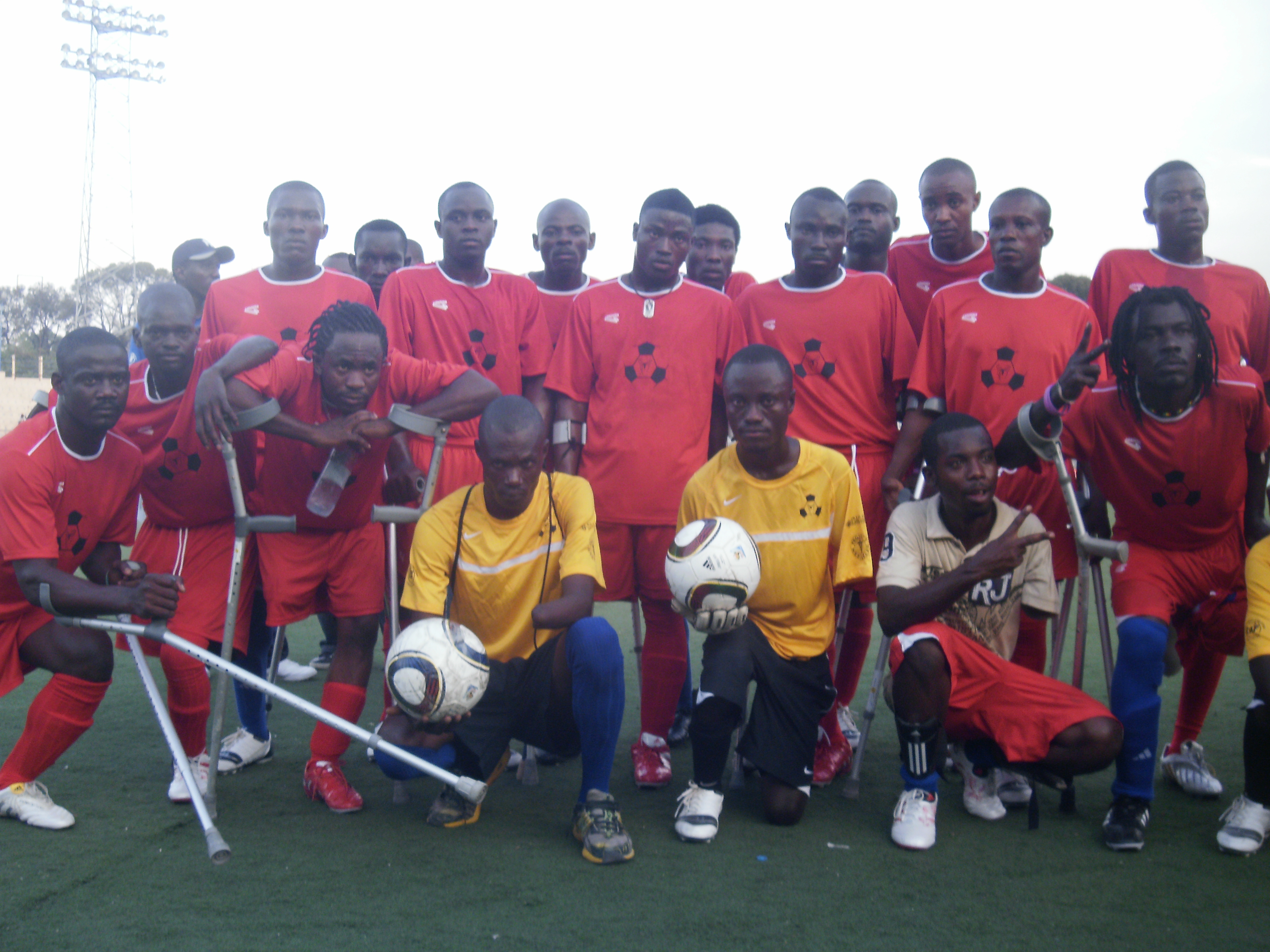
The Zayren team

Amputee soccer is an adapted sport played with 7 players on each team (6 field players and 1 goal keeper) on a smaller field. Field players have lower extremity amputations, and goalkeepers have upper extremity amputations. Field players use loftstrand (forearm) crutches, and play without prosthesis.

== History ==
The male and female teams were organized by amputees in August 2010 at Hospital Bernard Mevs. A majority of the players lost limbs during the 2010 earthquake. To date Team Zaryen is composed of male and female amputees who are looking to soccer as a way to show the world that disability does not crush the human spirit. The goal of the soccer team was to allow any Haitian Amputee the opportunity to play athletics. The players hoped to challenge the traditionally negative stigma of disability in Haiti, and show the country that it can emerge triumphant from the remnants of the earthquake.

The team's players all have amputated limbs. The team also aims to challenge negative views about disability in Haiti. During an interview, athlete Wilfrid Macena, who is a prosthetic technician at Project Medishare said: "I talk to the amputee patients and let them know that one day, they can be like me. I tell them that I can walk, I can drive, and I have learned to run...there are so many things I can do with my new leg and that they will be able to do these things one day. I let them know they can have a new life. That if you are an amputee it doesn't mean your life is over".

Since its inception the team has begun regular training, continuing to grow in skill and numbers. The Team is currently sponsored by Project Medishare in affiliation with the University of Miami, Challenged Athletes Foundation, and the Knights of Columbus. Despite sponsorship, they rely heavily on donations for daily meals, transportation fees, and equipment costs.

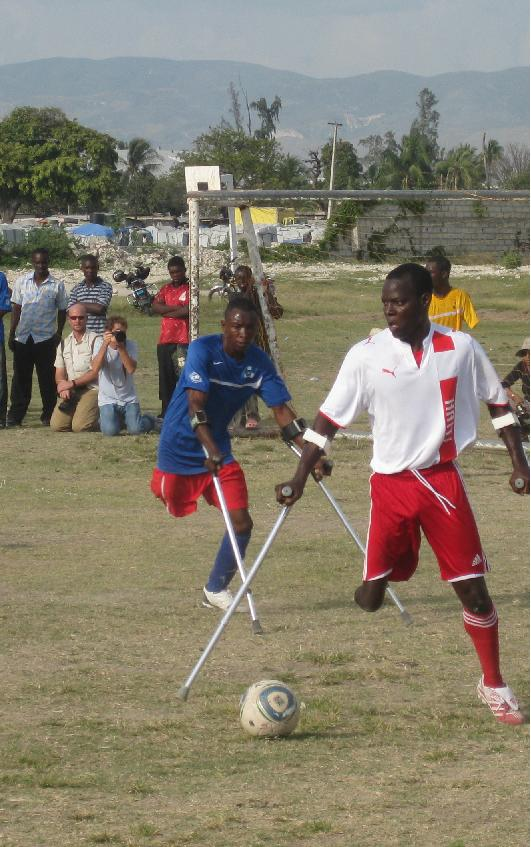
The players in action

Team Zaryen made their world debut in January 2011, when the men's team played their first game against the Haiti national amputee soccer team, whose last match was the 2010 Amputee World Cup in Argentina, where they were one of 17 countries who participated. The two teams met twice, the first was played at L'Athletique Du Haiti (a soccer complex close to the airport) in front of national and international press, and the second in front of almost 10,000 of their fellow countrymen at the National Stadium in Port-au-Prince. Their opponents, however, proved to be a tough matchup, as the Haiti national amputee soccer team won both games with 2–0 and 1–0 scores, respectively. The team continues to look for international competition. Many of the players on Team Zayren aspire to participate in the World Cup, as well as the opportunity to make the national team and will participate in future trial camps to try to achieve their goal. The women aspire to have the opportunity to play at the National Stadium.

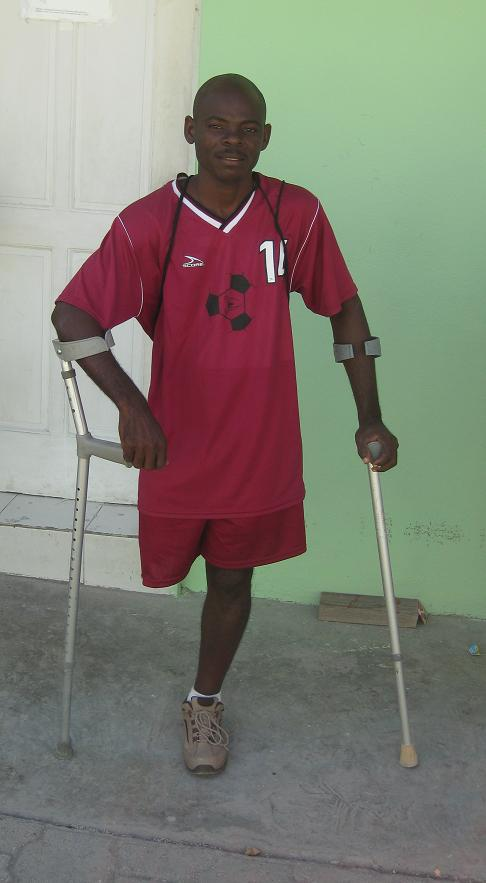
A Zaryen team member
