= 2024 EAFF European Amputee Football Championship =

2024 European Amputee Football Championship
Tournament details
- Host country: France
- City: Evian
- Dates: 1–8 June 2024
- Teams: 16

Final positions
- Champions: Turkey (3rd title)
- Runners-up: Spain
- Third place: Poland
- Fourth place: England

Tournament statistics
- Matches played: 48
- Goals scored: 192 (4 per match)
- Top scorer: (Turkey) Ömer Güleryüz (16 goals)

The 2024 European Amputee Football Championship was the sixth edition of the international competition of amputee football national men's teams. It was organized by the European Amputee Football Federation (EAFF), and was held in Evian, France between June 1–8, 2024. Turkey won the title for the third time, defeating Spain in the final. Poland became bronze medalist before England.

== Participating nations ==
Following 16 nations competed in four groups.

- Azerbaijan
- Belgium
- England
- France
- Georgia
- Germany
- Greece
- Ireland
- Israel
- Italy
- Netherlands
- Poland
- Scotland
- Spain
- Turkey
- Ukraine

== Preliminary round ==
=== Group A ===
Team	Pld	W	D	L	GF	GA	GD	P
Spain	3	3	0	0	11	0	+11	9
France	3	2	0	1	2	2	0	6
Ukraine	3	1	0	2	3	5	-2	3
Belgium	3	0	0	3	1	10	-9	0

1 June 2024
	France	(France)	1 – 0	(Ukraine)	Ukraine
2 June 2024
	Belgium	(Belgium)	0 – 6	(Spain)	Spain
3 June 2024
	France	(France)	1 – 0	(Belgium)	Belgium
	Spain	(Spain)	3 – 0	(Ukraine)	Ukraine
4 June 2024
	France	(France)	0 – 2	(Spain)	Spain
	Ukraine	(Ukraine)	3 – 1	(Belgium)	Belgium

=== Group B ===
Team	Pld	W	D	L	GF	GA	GD	P
England	3	3	0	0	10	0	+10	9
Italy	3	2	0	1	6	1	+5	6
Netherlands	3	1	0	2	4	5	-1	3
Georgia	3	0	0	3	0	14	-14	0

2 June 2024
	England	(England)	6 – 0	(Georgia (country))	Georgia
	Italy	(Italy)	2 – 0	(Netherlands)	Netherlands
3 June 2024
	Italy	(Italy)	4 – 0	(Georgia (country))	Georgia
	Netherlands	(Netherlands)	0 – 3	(England)	England
4 June 2024
	Georgia	(Georgia (country))	0 – 4	(Netherlands)	Netherlands
	England	(England)	1 – 0	(Italy)	Italy

=== Group C ===
Team	Pld	W	D	L	GF	GA	GD	P
Turkey	3	3	0	0	23	1	+22	9
Ireland	3	2	0	1	3	6	-3	6
Israel	3	0	1	2	2	9	-7	1
Azerbaijan	3	0	1	2	2	14	-12	1

2 June 2024
	Turkey	(Turkey)	6 – 0	(Israel)	Israel
	Ireland	(Republic of Ireland)	1 – 0	(Azerbaijan)	Azerbaijan
3 June 2024
	Ireland	(Republic of Ireland)	2 – 1	(Israel)	Israel
	Azerbaijan	(Azerbaijan)	1 – 12	(Turkey)	Turkey
4 June 2024
	Israel'	(Israel)	1 – 1	(Azerbaijan)	Azerbaijan
	Turkey	(Turkey)	5 – 0	(Republic of Ireland)	Ireland

=== Group D ===
Team	Pld	W	D	L	GF	GA	GD	P
Poland	3	3	0	0	28	0	+28	9
Germany	3	2	0	1	11	6	+5	6
Greece	3	1	0	2	2	14	-12	3
Scotland	3	0	0	3	1	22	-21	0

2 June 2024
	Greece	(Greece)	0 – 7	(Poland)	Poland
	Scotland	(Scotland)	0 – 5	(Germany)	Germany
3 June 2024
	Poland	(Poland)	15 – 0	(Scotland)	Scotland
	Germany	(Germany)	6 – 0	(Greece)	Greece
4 June 2024
	Germany	(Germany)	0 – 6	(Poland)	Poland
	Greece	(Greece)	2 – 1	(Scotland)	Scotland

== Knockout stage ==
=== Positions 9-16 ===
Positions 9-16
C3	Israel	3
D4	Scotland	4
D3	Greece	1
C4	Azerbaijan	2
A3	Ukraine	3
B4	(Georgia (country)) Georgia	1
B3	Netherlands	3
A4	Belgium	1

Positions 9-12
D4	Scotland	1
C4	Azerbaijan	2
A3	Ukraine	2
B3	Netherlands	3

9th place
C4	Azerbaijan	0
B3	Netherlands	1
11th place
D4	Scotland	0
A3	Ukraine	4

Positions 13-16
C3	Israel	2
D3	Greece	1
B4	(Georgia (country)) Georgia	0
A4	Belgium	1

13th place
C3	Israel	4
A4	Belgium	0
15th place
D3	Greece	3
B4	(Georgia (country)) Georgia	0

Positions 9-16

6 June 2024
	Greece	(Greece)	1 – 2	(Azerbaijan)	Azerbaijan
	Ukraine	(Ukraine)	3 – 1	(Georgia (country))	Georgia
	Netherlands	(Netherlands)	3 – 1	(Belgium)	Belgium
	Israel	(Israel)	3 – 4	(Scotland)	Scotland

Positions 13-16

7 June 2024
	Georgia	(Georgia (country))	0 - 1	(Belgium)	Belgium
	Israel	(Israel)	2 - 1	(Greece)	Greece

15th place

8 June 2024
	Greece	(Greece)	3 - 0	(Georgia (country))	Georgia

13th place

8 June 2024
	Israel	(Israel)	4 - 0	(Belgium)	Belgium

Positions 9-12

7 June 2024
	Scotland	(Scotland)	1 - 2	(Azerbaijan)	Azerbaijan
	Ukraine	(Ukraine)	2 - 3	(Netherlands)	Netherlands

11th place

8 June 2024
	Scotland	(Scotland)	0 - 4	(Ukraine)	Ukraine

9th place

7 June 2024
	Azerbaijan	(Azerbaijan)	0 - 1	(Netherlands)	Netherlands

=== Quarter-finals ===
Quarterfinals
C1	Turkey	11
D2	Germany	0
D1	Poland	3
C2	(Republic of Ireland) Ireland	0
A1	Spain	3
B2	Italy	0
B1	England	3
A2	France	0

Semifinals
C1	Turkey	5
D1	Poland	1
A1	Spain	2
B1	England	1

Gold medal
C1	Turkey	3
A1	Spain	0
Bronze medal
D1	Poland	1
B1	England	0

Positions 5-8
D2	Germany	2 (4)
C2	(Republic of Ireland) Ireland	2 (5)
B2	Italy	2
A2	France	0

5th place
C2	(Republic of Ireland) Ireland	0
B2	Italy	1
7th place
D2	Germany	3
A2	France	0

Quarter-finals

6 June 2024
	Turkey	(Turkey)	11 – 0	(Germany)	Germany
	Poland	(Poland)	3 – 0	(Republic of Ireland)	Ireland
	Spain	(Spain)	3 – 0	(Italy)	Italy
	England	(England)	3 – 0	(Spain)	France

Positions 5-8

7 June 2024
	Germany	(Germany)	2 – 2 (pen. 4 – 5)	(Republic of Ireland)	Ireland
	Italy	(Italy)	2 – 0	(France)	France

7th place

8 June 2024
	Germany	(Germany)	3 – 0	(France)	France

5th place

8 June 2024
	Ireland	(Republic of Ireland)	0 – 1	(Italy)	Italy

Semi-finals

7 June 2024
	Turkey	(Turkey)	5 – 1	(Poland)	Poland
	Spain	(Spain)	2 – 1	(England)	England

3rd place

8 June 2024
	Poland	(Poland)	1 – 0	(England)	England

Final

8 June 2024
	Turkey	(Turkey)	3 – 0	(Spain)	Spain

== Rankings ==
Rank	Team
1	Turkey
2	Spain
3	Poland
4	England
5	Italy
6	Ireland
7	Germany
8	France
9	Netherlands
10	Azerbaijan
11	Ukraine
12	Scotland
13	Israel
14	Belgium
15	Greece
16	Georgia

2024 European Amputee Football Championship
(Turkey)
Turkey
Third title

== Awards ==
- Top goalscorer: (Turkey) Ömer Güleryüz (16 goals)
- Best goalkeeper: (Spain) Luis Ribeiro Medina
- Most valuable player: (Turkey) Ömer Güleryüz
