= 1991 Amputee Soccer World Cup (indoor) =

1991 Amputee Football World Cup (indoor)
Tournament details
- Host country: Uzbekistan
- City: Tashkent
- Dates: 11-15 October
- Teams: 6

Final positions
- Champions: Uzbekistan (1st title)
- Runners-up: England
- Third place: Brazil
- Fourth place: El Salvador

The 1991 Amputee Soccer World Cup (indoor) was the indoor tournament of the 6th annual international competition of amputee football national men's teams. It was organized by the Amputee Soccer International, and was held in Tashkent, Uzbekistan between 11 and 15 October 1991 before outdoor championship.

Uzbekistan won the title for the first time since the break-up of the Soviet Union of that year, defeating England in the final. Brazil became bronze medalist.

== Participating nations ==
Following six nations competed in the tournament. Uzbekistan was presented by Matonat Tashkent, Russia - by InvEskoSport Barnaul.

- Brazil
- El Salvador
- England
- Russia
- United States
- Uzbekistan

== Preliminary round ==
Six teams competed in the round-robin preliminary tournament. Top four teams qualified for the medal matches.

| Team | Pld | W | D | L | GF | GA | GD | P |
|---|---|---|---|---|---|---|---|---|
| (Uzbekistan) Matonat Tashkent | ? | ? | ? | ? | ? | ? | ? | ? |
| England | ? | ? | ? | ? | ? | ? | ? | ? |
| Brazil | ? | ? | ? | ? | ? | ? | ? | ? |
| El Salvador | ? | ? | ? | ? | ? | ? | ? | ? |
| United States | ? | ? | ? | ? | ? | ? | ? | ? |
| (Russia) InvEskoSport Barnaul | ? | ? | ? | ? | ? | ? | ? | ? |

== Medal matches ==
3rd place

October 1991
| | Brazil | (Brazil) | W – L | (El Salvador) | El Salvador |

Final

October 1991
| | Matonat Tashkent | (Uzbekistan) | 1 – 0 | (England) | England |

== Rankings ==
| Rank | Team |
|---|---|
| 1 | Uzbekistan |
| 2 | England |
| 3 | Brazil |
| 4 | El Salvador |
| 5 | United States |
| 6 | Russia |

1991 Amputee Football World Cup (indoor)

Uzbekistan
First title
