= 1989 Amputee Soccer World Cup (indoor) =

1989 Amputee Football World Cup (indoor)
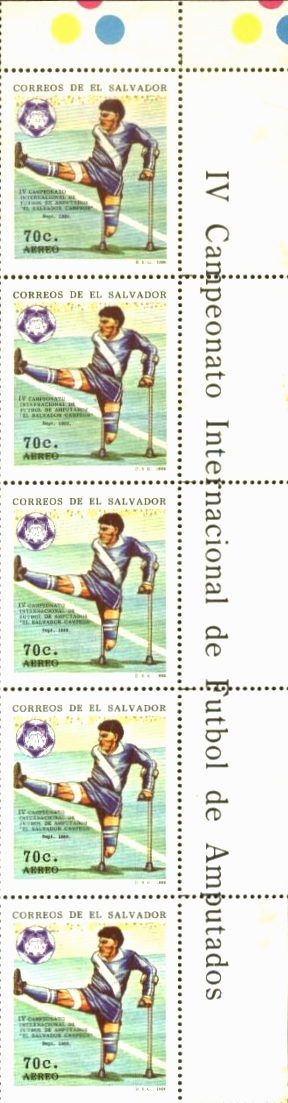
- IV Amputee Football World Cup 1989

Tournament details
- Host country: United States
- City: Seattle
- Dates: 2–4 September
- Teams: 9
- Venue: 1

Final positions
- Champions: England (2nd title)
- Runners-up: El Salvador
- Third place: Brazil
- Fourth place: Soviet Union

The 1989 Amputee Soccer World Cup (indoor) was the indoor tournament of the 4th annual international competition of amputee football national men's teams. It was organized by the Amputee Soccer International, and was held in Seattle, United States between 2 and 4 September 1989 simultaneously with outdoor championship.

England won the title for the second time, defeating El Salvador in the final. Brazil took third place.

== Participating nations ==
Following six nations competed in the tournament. United States was represented by national team and three clubs: Seattle Athlete's Foot, Portland Team Oregon, and Los Angeles Orthomedics.

- Brazil
- Canada
- El Salvador
- England
- Soviet Union
- United States

== Preliminary round ==
Nine teams competed in the round-robin preliminary tournament. All games were played at the Woodinville Indoor Soccer Center on Saturday, starting at 8:00 a.m.

Top four teams qualified for the knockout stage.

Team	Pld	W	D	L	GF	GA	GD	P
England	?	?	?	?	?	?	?	?
El Salvador	?	?	?	?	?	?	?	?
Brazil	?	?	?	?	?	?	?	?
Soviet Union	?	?	?	?	?	?	?	?
United States	?	?	?	?	?	?	?	?
Canada	?	?	?	?	?	?	?	?
(United States) Seattle Athlete's Foot	?	?	?	?	?	?	?	?
(United States) Portland Team Oregon	?	?	?	?	?	?	?	?
(United States) Los Angeles Orthomedics	?	?	?	?	?	?	?	?

== Knockout stage ==
Semifinal indoor games started at Woodinville at 7:30 p.m. Saturday with the title game at 10 a.m. Monday.

Semi-finals

2 September 1989
19:30 PST	England	(England)	W – L	?	Woodinville Indoor Soccer Center
	El Salvador	(El Salvador)	W – L	?	Woodinville Indoor Soccer Center

3rd place

4 September 1989
	Brazil	(Brazil)	2 – 1	(Soviet Union)	Soviet Union	Woodinville Indoor Soccer Center

Final

4 September 1989
10:00 PST	England	(England)	4 – 2	(El Salvador)	El Salvador	Woodinville Indoor Soccer Center

== Rankings ==
Rank	Team
1	England
2	El Salvador
3	Brazil
4	Soviet Union
?	United States
?	Canada
?	United States
?	United States
?	United States

1989 Amputee Football World Cup (indoor)

England
Second title
