= 1990 Amputee Soccer World Cup (indoor) =

1990 Amputee Football World Cup (indoor)
Tournament details
- Host country: United States
- City: Seattle
- Dates: 31 August – 1 September
- Teams: 6
- Venue: 1

Final positions
- Champions: England (3rd title)
- Runners-up: Brazil
- Third place: El Salvador or Soviet Union
- Fourth place: El Salvador or Soviet Union

Tournament statistics
- Matches played: 13

The 1990 Amputee Soccer World Cup (indoor) was the indoor tournament of the 5th annual international competition of amputee football national men's teams. It was organized by the Amputee Soccer International, and was held in Seattle, United States between 31 August and 1 September 1990 before outdoor championship.

England won the title for the third time, defeating Brazil in the final.

== Participating nations ==
Following five nations competed in the tournament. United States was represented by Seattle Athlete's Foot and Los Angeles Orthomedics.

- Brazil
- El Salvador
- England
- Soviet Union
- United States

== Preliminary round ==
Six teams competed in the round-robin preliminary tournament. All games were played at the Woodinville Indoor Soccer Center on Friday at 10:00 a.m. to 8:00 p.m., and Saturday at 10:00 a.m. with the championship match at 6:00 p.m.

Top four teams qualified for the knockout stage.

Team	Pld	W	D	L	GF	GA	GD	P
Brazil	3	2	1	0	8	1	+7	5
El Salvador	3	1	1	0	3	2	+1	3
England	3	1	0	1	11	2	+9	2
Soviet Union	3	1	0	1	11	1	+10	2
(United States) Seattle Athlete's Foot	3	0	0	1	0	11	-11	0
(United States) Los Angeles Orthomedics	3	0	0	2	0	16	-16	0

31 August 1990
10:00 PST	Brazil	(Brazil)	1 – 0	(Soviet Union)	Soviet Union	Woodinville Indoor Soccer Center
	England	(England)	10 – 0	(United States)	Los Angeles	Woodinville Indoor Soccer Center
	Brazil	(Brazil)	1 – 1	(El Salvador)	El Salvador	Woodinville Indoor Soccer Center
	Seattle	(United States)	0 – 11	(Soviet Union)	Soviet Union	Woodinville Indoor Soccer Center
	Brazil	(Brazil)	6 – 0	(United States)	Los Angeles	Woodinville Indoor Soccer Center
	El Salvador	(El Salvador)	2 – 1	(England)	England	Woodinville Indoor Soccer Center
1 September 1990
	Seattle	(United States)	? – ?	(El Salvador)	El Salvador	Woodinville Indoor Soccer Center
	Los Angeles	(United States)	? – ?	(Soviet Union)	Soviet Union	Woodinville Indoor Soccer Center
	Seattle	(United States)	? – ?	(England)	England	Woodinville Indoor Soccer Center

== Knockout stage ==
Semi-finals

1 September 1990
	Brazil	(Brazil)	W – L	(Soviet Union)	Soviet Union	Woodinville Indoor Soccer Center
	El Salvador	(El Salvador)	L – W	(England)	England	Woodinville Indoor Soccer Center

3rd place

1 September 1990
	Soviet Union	(Soviet Union)	? – ?	(El Salvador)	El Salvador	Woodinville Indoor Soccer Center

Final

1 September 1990
18:00 PST	Brazil	(Brazil)	2 – 3 (2nd e.t.)	(England)	England	Woodinville Indoor Soccer Center

== Rankings ==
Rank	Team
1	England
2	Brazil
3	El Salvador or Soviet Union
4	El Salvador or Soviet Union
5	United States
6	United States

1990 Amputee Football World Cup (indoor)

England
Third title
