= 1988 Amputee Soccer World Cup (indoor) =

1988 Amputee Football World Cup (indoor)
Tournament details
- Host country: United States
- City: Seattle
- Dates: 3–5 September
- Teams: 8
- Venue: 1

Final positions
- Champions: England (1st title)
- Runners-up: El Salvador
- Third place: United States
- Fourth place: Canada

Tournament statistics
- Matches played: 17

The 1988 Amputee Soccer World Cup (indoor) was the indoor tournament of the 3rd annual international competition of amputee football national men's teams. It was organized by the Amputee Soccer International, and was held in Seattle, United States, between 3 and 5 September 1988 simultaneously with outdoor championship. This is the first time in the World Cup series that two cups have been played - indoors and outdoors.

England won the title for the first time, defeating El Salvador in the final. The United States representative became bronze medalists.

== Participating nations ==
The following four nations competed in the tournament. Canada was represented by Vancouver Unipeds and Calgary; United States - by Seattle Athlete's Foot, Portland Team Oregon, Los Angeles Orthomedics, and Sacramento.

- Canada
- El Salvador
- England
- United States

== Preliminary round ==
Eight teams competed in the round-robin preliminary tournament. All games were played at the Woodinville Indoor Soccer Center.

The top four teams qualified for gold and bronze medal matches.

Team	Pld	W	D	L	GF	GA	GD	P
England	3	3	0	0	?	?	?	6
El Salvador	3	3	0	0	?	1	?	6
(United States) Los Angeles Orthomedics	4	?	?	?	?	?	?	?
(Canada) Calgary	6	?	?	?	?	?	?	?
(United States) Seattle Athlete's Foot	3	?	?	?	?	?	?	?
(Canada) Vancouver Unipeds	3	?	?	?	?	?	?	?
(United States) Portland Team Oregon	4	?	?	?	?	?	?	?
(United States) Sacramento	4	?	?	?	?	?	?	?

3 September 1988
8:00 PST	England	(England)	W – L	(Canada)	Calgary	Woodinville Indoor Soccer Center
9:00 PST	Seattle	(United States)	? – ?	(United States)	Sacramento	Woodinville Indoor Soccer Center
10:00 PST	Vancouver	(Canada)	? – ?	(United States)	Portland	Woodinville Indoor Soccer Center
11:00 PST	El Salvador	(El Salvador)	W – 0	(United States)	Los Angeles	Woodinville Indoor Soccer Center
12:00 PST	Calgary	(Canada)	? – ?	(United States)	Sacramento	Woodinville Indoor Soccer Center
14:00 PST	Portland	(United States)	? – ?	(United States)	Seattle	Woodinville Indoor Soccer Center
16:00 PST	Vancouver	(Canada)	L – W	(England)	England	Woodinville Indoor Soccer Center
17:00 PST	Calgary	(Canada)	? – ?	(United States)	Los Angeles	Woodinville Indoor Soccer Center
4 September 1988
08:00 PST	England	(England)	W – L	(United States)	Portland	Woodinville Indoor Soccer Center
09:00 PST	El Salvador	(El Salvador)	3 – 1	(United States)	Seattle	Woodinville Indoor Soccer Center
10:00 PST	Sacramento	(United States)	? – ?	(United States)	Los Angeles	Woodinville Indoor Soccer Center
13:00 PST	Calgary	(Canada)	? – ?	(United States)	Sacramento	Woodinville Indoor Soccer Center
15:00 PST	El Salvador	(El Salvador)	W – 0	(Canada)	Calgary	Woodinville Indoor Soccer Center
16:00 PST	Vancouver	(Canada)	? – ?	(United States)	Los Angeles	Woodinville Indoor Soccer Center
17:00 PST	Calgary	(Canada)	? – ?	(United States)	Portland	Woodinville Indoor Soccer Center

== Medal matches ==
3rd place

5 September 1988
9:00 PST	Los Angeles	(United States)	5 – 4	(Canada)	Calgary	Woodinville Indoor Soccer Center

Final

5 September 1988
10:00 PST	England	(England)	4 – 3 (2nd e.t.)	(El Salvador)	El Salvador	Woodinville Indoor Soccer Center

== Rankings ==
Rank	Team
1	England
2	El Salvador
3	United States
4	Canada
5	United States or Canada
6	United States or Canada
7	United States or Canada
8	United States or Canada

1988 Amputee Football World Cup (indoor)

England
First title
