= World Amputee Football Federation =

Governing body of amputee football

- Founded: 1985; 41 years ago
- Headquarters: Warsaw, Poland
- FIFA affiliation: 2002; 24 years ago
- President: Arif Umit Uzturk
- Vice-President: Celeste Tchiama; Mateusz Widlak
- Website: amputeefootball.org

The World Amputee Football Federation (WAFF) is the sport governing body responsible for the administration of amputee football associations worldwide.

By 1985 the first world amputee football federation was established as Amputee Soccer International through efforts of Bill Barry with the assistance of Don Bennett and other members of the Seattle Seattle Handicapped Sports and Recreation Association (SHSRA). On December 8, 1998 International Amputee Football Federation was formed. In November 2003 World Amputee Football Federation becomes new global governing body.

WAFF is responsible for the organization of the Men and Women's Amputee World Cup.

WAFF mission is "to include and support people with amputations or limb defects, increase their access to amputee football opportunities, and use soccer to improve their quality of life".

== Affiliated organizations ==
Affiliated organizations provide support to FIFA without encroaching on the rights of national organizations:

- European Amputee Football Federation (EAFF)
- North Central America and Caribbean Amputee Football Federation (NCACAFF)
- Confederação Sulamericana de Futebol para Amputados (CONSFA)
- Confederation of African Amputee Football (CAAF)
- Asian Amputee Football Confederation (AAFC)

== Leadership ==
The following is a table of leaders of WAFF. Elections are held every 4 years.

Last updated: 6 November 2024

Name	Role	Ref.
(Turkey) Arif Umit Uzturk	President	
(Angola) Celeste Tchiama	First Vice President	
(Poland) Mateusz Widlak	2nd Vice President	
(Turkey) Tolga Korkusuz	Treasurer	
(Germany) Georg Schlachtenberger	Secretary General	
(Netherlands) Adri van Ingen	Board Member	
(England) Ian Clark	Board Member	

== See also ==
- Amputee Football World Cup
- Women's Amputee Football World Cup
