= 1988 Amputee Soccer World Cup (outdoor) =

1988 Amputee Football World Cup (outdoor)
Tournament details
- Host country: United States
- City: Seattle
- Dates: 3–5 September
- Teams: 5
- Venue: 1

Final positions
- Champions: El Salvador (2nd title)
- Runners-up: United States
- Third place: England
- Fourth place: Canada

Tournament statistics
- Matches played: 9

The 1988 Amputee Soccer World Cup (outdoor) was the outdoor tournament of the 3rd annual international competition of amputee football national men's teams. It was organized by the Amputee Soccer International, and was held in Seattle, United States between 3 and 5 September 1988 simultaneously with indoor championship. This is the first time in the World Cup series that two Cups have been played - indoors and outdoors.

El Salvador won the title for the second time, defeating United States in the final. England took third place.

== Participating nations ==
Following four nations competed in the tournament. Canada was represented by Vancouver Unipeds; United States - by Seattle Athlete's Foot, and Oregon-California mixed team.

- Canada
- El Salvador
- England
- United States

== Preliminary round ==
Five teams competed in the round-robin preliminary tournament. All games were played at the Shoreline Stadium.

Top four teams qualified for gold and bronze medal matches. After finals an All-Star Game was held at 14:30.

| Team | Pld | W | D | L | GF | GA | GD | P |
|---|---|---|---|---|---|---|---|---|
| El Salvador | 3 | 3 | 0 | 0 | ? | 0 | ? | 6 |
| (United States) Seattle Athlete's Foot | 3 | 1 | 2 | 0 | ? | ? | ? | 4 |
| (Canada) Vancouver Unipeds | 3 | ? | 1 | 1 | ? | ? | ? | ? |
| England | 3 | ? | 1 | 1 | ? | ? | ? | ? |
| (United States) Oregon-California | 2 | 0 | 0 | 2 | ? | ? | ? | 0 |

3 September 1988
| 11:00 PST | England | (England) | D – D | (United States) | Seattle | Shoreline Stadium |
| 13:00 PST | Vancouver | (Canada) | 0 – W | (El Salvador) | El Salvador | Shoreline Stadium |
| 15:00 PST | El Salvador | (El Salvador) | W – L | (United States) | Oregon-California | Shoreline Stadium |
4 September 1988
| 10:00 PST | Vancouver | (Canada) | ? – ? | (England) | England | Shoreline Stadium |
| 12:00 PST | Vancouver | (Canada) | D – D | (United States) | Seattle | Shoreline Stadium |
| 13:00 PST | England | (England) | 0 – W | (El Salvador) | El Salvador | Shoreline Stadium |
| 14:00 PST | Seattle | (United States) | W – L | (United States) | Oregon-California | Shoreline Stadium |

== Medal matches ==
3rd place

5 September 1988
| 12:00 PST | England | | 1 – 0 | (Canada) | Vancouver | Shoreline Stadium |

Final

5 September 1988
| 13:00 PST | El Salvador | (El Salvador) | 3 – 0 | (United States) | Seattle | Shoreline Stadium |

== Exhibition match ==
5 September 1988
| 14:30 PST | El Salvador | (El Salvador) | ? – ? | All-Star Team | Shoreline Stadium |

== Rankings ==
| Rank | Team |
|---|---|
| 1 | El Salvador |
| 2 | United States |
| 3 | England |
| 4 | Canada |
| 5 | United States |

1988 Amputee Football World Cup (outdoor)

El Salvador
Second title
