= 1987 Amputee Soccer World Cup =

1987 Amputee Football World Cup
Tournament details
- Host country: United States
- City: Seattle
- Dates: 5–7 September
- Teams: 7
- Venue: 2

Final positions
- Champions: El Salvador (1st title)
- Runners-up: United States
- Third place: United States or Canada
- Fourth place: United States or Canada

Tournament statistics
- Top scorer: (El Salvador) José Vladimir "Rambo" Melgar Maravilla (6 goals)

The 1987 Amputee Soccer World Cup was the 2nd edition of the international competition of amputee football national men's teams. It was organized by the Amputee Soccer International, and was held in Seattle, United States between 5 and 7 September 1987.

All games were split between Shoreline Stadium and the Woodinville Indoor Soccer Center.

El Salvador won the gold medal for the first time, defeating the United States representative (Seattle Athlete's Foot) in the final.

== Participating nations ==
Three nations competed in the tournament. Canada was represented by Vancouver Unipeds and Calgary; United States - by Seattle Athlete's Foot, Portland Team Oregon, Los Angeles Orthomedics, and Idaho.

- Canada
- El Salvador
- United States

== Preliminary round ==
On September 5 and 6, games at Shoreline Stadium ran from 10:30 to 17:00, with indoor games from 9:00 to 17:00.

The top two teams of preliminary round qualified for the gold medal match. The championship game was held on September 7 at 13:00 at Shoreline Stadium. An All-Star Friendship Game was held at 14:30.

Team	Pld	W	D	L	GF	GA	GD	P
El Salvador	?	?	?	?	?	?	?	?
(United States) Seattle Athlete's Foot	?	?	?	?	?	?	?	?
(United States) Portland Team Oregon	?	?	?	?	?	?	?	?
(Canada) Vancouver Unipeds	?	?	?	?	?	?	?	?
(United States) Los Angeles Orthomedics	?	?	?	?	?	?	?	?
(Canada) Calgary	?	?	?	?	?	?	?	?
(United States) Idaho	?	?	?	?	?	?	?	?

== Final ==
7 September 1987
13:00 PST	El Salvador	(El Salvador)	4 – 0	(United States)	Seattle Athlete's Foot	Shoreline Stadium

== Rankings ==
Rank	Team
1	El Salvador
2	United States
3	United States or Canada
4	United States or Canada
5	United States or Canada
6	United States or Canada
7	United States or Canada

1987 Amputee Football World Cup

El Salvador
First title
