= 1991 Amputee Soccer World Cup (outdoor) =

1991 Amputee Football World Cup (outdoor)
Tournament details
- Host country: Uzbekistan
- City: Tashkent
- Dates: 16-20 October
- Teams: 6

Final positions
- Champions: Uzbekistan (2nd title)
- Runners-up: El Salvador
- Third place: Brazil
- Fourth place: England

The 1991 Amputee Soccer World Cup (outdoor) was the outdoor tournament of the 6th annual international competition of amputee football national men's teams. It was organized by the Amputee Soccer International, and was held in Tashkent, Uzbekistan between 16 and 20 October 1991 after indoor championship.

Uzbekistan won the title for the second time, defeating El Salvador in the final. Brazil became bronze medalist before England.

== Participating nations ==
Following six nations competed in the tournament. Uzbekistan was presented by Matonat Tashkent, Russia - by InvEskoSport Barnaul.

- Brazil
- El Salvador
- England
- Russia
- United States
- Uzbekistan

== Preliminary round ==
Six teams competed in the round-robin preliminary tournament. Top four teams qualified for the medal matches.

Team	Pld	W	D	L	GF	GA	GD	P
(Uzbekistan) Matonat Tashkent	?	?	?	?	?	?	?	?
El Salvador	?	?	?	?	?	?	?	?
Brazil	?	?	?	?	?	?	?	?
England	?	?	?	?	?	?	?	?
United States	?	?	?	?	?	?	?	?
(Russia) InvEskoSport Barnaul	?	?	?	?	?	?	?	?

== Medal matches ==
3rd place

October 1991
	Brazil	(Brazil)	2 – 1	(England)	England

Final

October 1991
	Matonat Tashkent	(Uzbekistan)	0 – 0 (pen. 2 – 0)	(El Salvador)	El Salvador

== Rankings ==
Rank	Team
1	Uzbekistan
2	El Salvador
3	Brazil
4	England
5	United States
6	Russia

1991 Amputee Football World Cup (outdoor)

Uzbekistan
Second title
