= 1986 Amputee Soccer World Cup =

1986 Amputee Football World Cup
Tournament details
- Host country: United States
- City: Seattle
- Dates: 27–28 September
- Teams: 3 (6)
- Venue: 1

Final positions
- Champions: United States (1st title)
- Runners-up: United States or Canada
- Third place: United States or Canada

Tournament statistics
- Matches played: 11

The 1986 Amputee Soccer World Cup was the inaugural international competition of amputee football national men's teams. It was organized by the Amputee Soccer International, and was held in Seattle, United States between 27 and 28 September 1986.

All matches were played indoor in the Woodinville Indoor Soccer Center.

United States (represented by amputee soccer team Seattle Athlete's Foot) won the inaugural World Cup.

== Participating nations ==
Two nations competed in the tournament. Canada was represented by amputee team Vancouver; United States - by amputee teams Seattle Athlete's Foot, Portland Team Oregon, and able-bodied teams Seattle Mitre Eagles, SPU Alumni, Woodinville.

Amputee squads played each other and with non-amputee teams, which played on crutches and keep one foot off the ground at all times.

- Canada
- United States

== Preliminary round ==
In the round-robin tournament amputee teams played each other and one game against the able-bodied team. Able-bodied teams also played each other and one game against the amputee team.

The top two amputee teams and the top two able-bodied teams qualified for their respective finals.

Amputee teams

Team	Pld	W	D	L	GF	GA	GD	P
(United States) Athlete's Foot	3	?	?	?	?	?	?	?
(United States) Team Oregon	3	?	?	?	?	?	?	?
(Canada) Vancouver	3	?	?	?	?	?	?	?

Able-bodied teams

Team	Pld	W	D	L	GF	GA	GD	P
(United States) Seattle Mitre Eagles	3	?	?	?	?	?	?	?
(United States) SPU Alumni	3	?	?	?	?	?	?	?
(United States) Woodinville	3	?	?	?	?	?	?	?

27 September 1986
9:00 PST	Athlete's Foot	(United States)	? – ?	(United States)	Woodinville	Woodinville Indoor Soccer Center
9:45 PST	Seattle Mitre Eagles	(United States)	? – ?	(United States)	SPU Alumni	Woodinville Indoor Soccer Center
10:30 PST	Athlete's Foot	(United States)	? – ?	(Canada)	Vancouver	Woodinville Indoor Soccer Center
11:15 PST	Team Oregon	(United States)	? – ?	(United States)	Seattle Mitre Eagles	Woodinville Indoor Soccer Center
12:00 PST	Woodinville	(United States)	? – ?	(United States)	SPU Alumni	Woodinville Indoor Soccer Center
12:45 PST	Team Oregon	(United States)	? – ?	(Canada)	Vancouver	Woodinville Indoor Soccer Center
28 September 1986
13:00 PST	Athlete's Foot	(United States)	? – ?	(United States)	Team Oregon	Woodinville Indoor Soccer Center
13:45 PST	Vancouver	(Canada)	? – ?	(United States)	SPU Alumni	Woodinville Indoor Soccer Center
14:30 PST	Woodinville	(United States)	? – ?	(United States)	Seattle Mitre Eagles	Woodinville Indoor Soccer Center

== Finals ==
Amputee Gold medal match

28 September 1986
15:15 PST	Athlete's Foot	(United States)	W – L	?	Woodinville Indoor Soccer Center

Able-bodied Gold medal match

28 September 1986
16:00 PST	?	(United States)	? – ?	(United States)	?	Woodinville Indoor Soccer Center

== Rankings ==
Rank	Team
1	United States
2	United States or Canada
3	United States or Canada

1986 Amputee Football World Cup

United States
First title
