= 1989 Amputee Soccer World Cup (outdoor) =

1989 Amputee Football World Cup (outdoor)
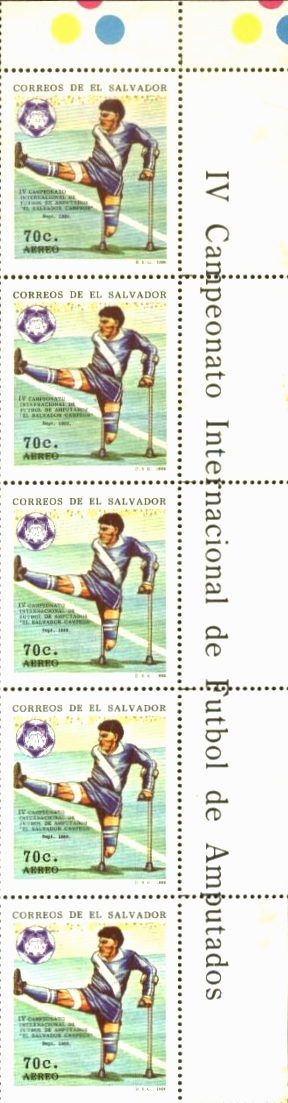
- IV Amputee Football World Cup 1989

Tournament details
- Host country: United States
- City: Seattle
- Dates: 3–4 September
- Teams: 6
- Venue: 1

Final positions
- Champions: El Salvador (3rd title)
- Runners-up: England
- Third place: Brazil
- Fourth place: Soviet Union

The 1989 Amputee Soccer World Cup (outdoor) was the outdoor tournament of the 4th annual international competition of amputee football national men's teams. It was organized by the Amputee Soccer International, and was held in Seattle, United States between 3 and 4 September 1989 simultaneously with indoor championship.

El Salvador won the title for the third time, defeating England in the final. Brazil took third place.

== Participating nations ==
Following six nations competed in the tournament.

- Brazil
- Canada
- El Salvador
- England
- Soviet Union
- United States

== Preliminary round ==
Six national teams competed in the round-robin preliminary tournament. All games were played at Shoreline Stadium on Sunday, starting at 8:00 a.m.

Top four teams qualified for the knockout stage.

Team	Pld	W	D	L	GF	GA	GD	P
El Salvador	?	?	?	?	?	?	?	?
England	?	?	?	?	?	?	?	?
Brazil	?	?	?	?	?	?	?	?
Soviet Union	?	?	?	?	?	?	?	?
United States	?	?	?	?	?	?	?	?
Canada	?	?	?	?	?	?	?	?

== Knockout stage ==
Outdoor semifinals were set for 4:30 p.m. Sunday at Shoreline with the championship match set for 3 p.m. Monday.

Semi-finals

3 September 1989
16:30 PST	England	(England)	W – L	?	Shoreline Stadium
	El Salvador	(El Salvador)	W – L	?	Shoreline Stadium

3rd place

4 September 1989
	Brazil	(Brazil)	2 – 1	(Soviet Union)	Soviet Union	Shoreline Stadium

Final

4 September 1989
15:00 PST	El Salvador	(El Salvador)	2 – 0	(England)	England	Shoreline Stadium

== Rankings ==
Rank	Team
1	El Salvador
2	England
3	Brazil
4	Soviet Union
?	United States
?	Canada

1989 Amputee Football World Cup (outdoor)

El Salvador
Third title
