= 1990 Amputee Soccer World Cup (outdoor) =

1990 Amputee Football World Cup (outdoor)
Tournament details
- Host country: United States
- City: Seattle
- Dates: 2–3 September
- Teams: 6
- Venue: 1

Final positions
- Champions: Soviet Union (1st title)
- Runners-up: El Salvador
- Third place: Brazil or England
- Fourth place: Brazil or England

Tournament statistics
- Matches played: 13

The 1990 Amputee Soccer World Cup (outdoor) was the outdoor tournament of the 5th annual international competition of amputee football national men's teams. It was organized by the Amputee Soccer International, and was held in Seattle, United States between 2 and 3 September 1990 after indoor championship.

Soviet Union won the only title prior to the country's break-up in the following year, defeating El Salvador in the final.

== Participating nations ==
Following six nations competed in the tournament.

- Brazil
- Canada
- El Salvador
- England
- Soviet Union
- United States

== Preliminary round ==
Six teams competed in the round-robin preliminary tournament. All games were played at Shoreline Stadium on Sunday at 10:00 a.m. to 8:00 p.m., and Monday at 9:00 a.m. to 12:00 p.m.

Top four teams qualified for the knockout stage.

Team	Pld	W	D	L	GF	GA	GD	P
El Salvador	3	1	1	0	5	1	+4	3
Brazil	3	1	1	0	4	0	+4	3
England	3	1	1	0	3	0	+3	3
Soviet Union	3	1	1	0	2	1	+1	3
United States	3	0	0	2	0	4	-4	0
Canada	3	0	0	2	0	8	-8	0

2 September 1990
10:00 PST	El Salvador	(El Salvador)	4 – 0	(Canada)	Canada	Shoreline Stadium
	England	(England)	0 – 0	(Brazil)	Brazil	Shoreline Stadium
	El Salvador	(El Salvador)	1 – 1	(Soviet Union)	Soviet Union	Shoreline Stadium
	Soviet Union	(Soviet Union)	1 – 0	(United States)	United States	Shoreline Stadium
	Brazil	(Brazil)	4 – 0	(Canada)	Canada	Shoreline Stadium
	England	(England)	3 – 0	(United States)	United States	Shoreline Stadium
3 September 1990
9:00 PST		? – ?		Shoreline Stadium
10:00 PST		? – ?		Shoreline Stadium
11:00 PST		? – ?		Shoreline Stadium

== Knockout stage ==
Semi-finals

3 September 1990
	El Salvador	(El Salvador)	W – L	?	Shoreline Stadium
	Soviet Union	(Soviet Union)	W – L	?	Shoreline Stadium

3rd place

3 September 1990
15:00 PST	Brazil	(Brazil)	? – ?	(England)	England	Shoreline Stadium

Final

3 September 1990
16:00 PST	El Salvador	(El Salvador)	0 – 0 (pen. 1 – 3)	(Soviet Union)	Soviet Union	Shoreline Stadium

== Rankings ==
Rank	Team
1	Soviet Union
2	El Salvador
3	Brazil or England
4	Brazil or England
5	United States or Canada
6	United States or Canada

1990 Amputee Football World Cup (outdoor)

Soviet Union
First title
