= Amputee football =

Association football for disabled players

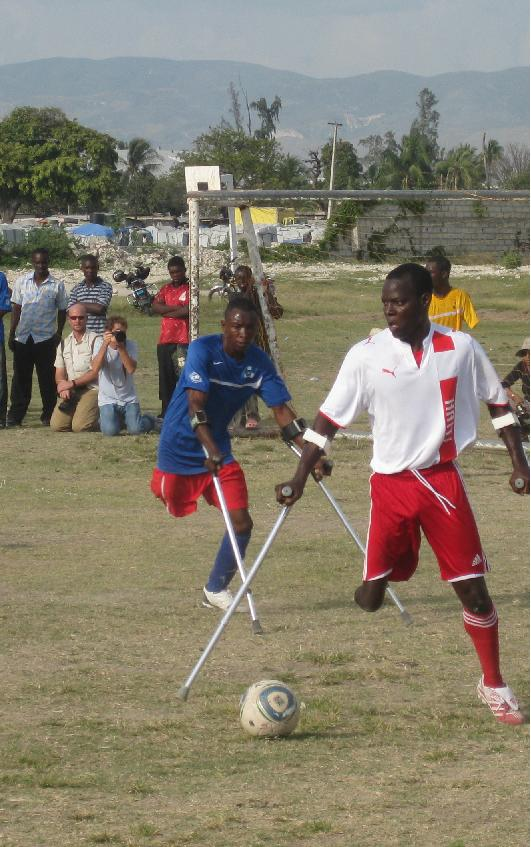
- An amputee football match in Port-au-Prince, Haiti
- Highest governing body: World Amputee Football Federation (WAFF)

Characteristics
- Team members: 7
- Type: Team sport, ball sport
- Equipment: Football (or soccer ball)

Amputee football is a disabled sport played with seven players on each team (six outfield players and one goalkeeper). Outfield players have lower extremity amputations, and goalkeepers have an upper extremity amputation. Outfield players use loftstrand (forearm) crutches, and play without their prostheses.

== History ==
The beginnings of Amputee football can be traced to Europe in the early 1900s. The game which is played today, was created by Don Bennett, who was inspired from his accidental kick of a basketball on crutches in 1982.

In 1984 the first international amputee football tournament was held in Seattle. With the help of soccer coach Bill Barry, beginning in 1985, Amputee Soccer International was established. Through exhibition matches in the 1980s, the sport attracted media attention and gained popularity. In 2003, the World Amputee Football Federation (WAFF) became the new global governing body for amputee football.

In 2023, Marcin Oleksy from Warta Poznań, Poland became the first amputee footballer to win the FIFA Puskás Award for "most beautiful goal of the year" at The Best FIFA Football Awards 2022 ceremony.

== Around the world ==
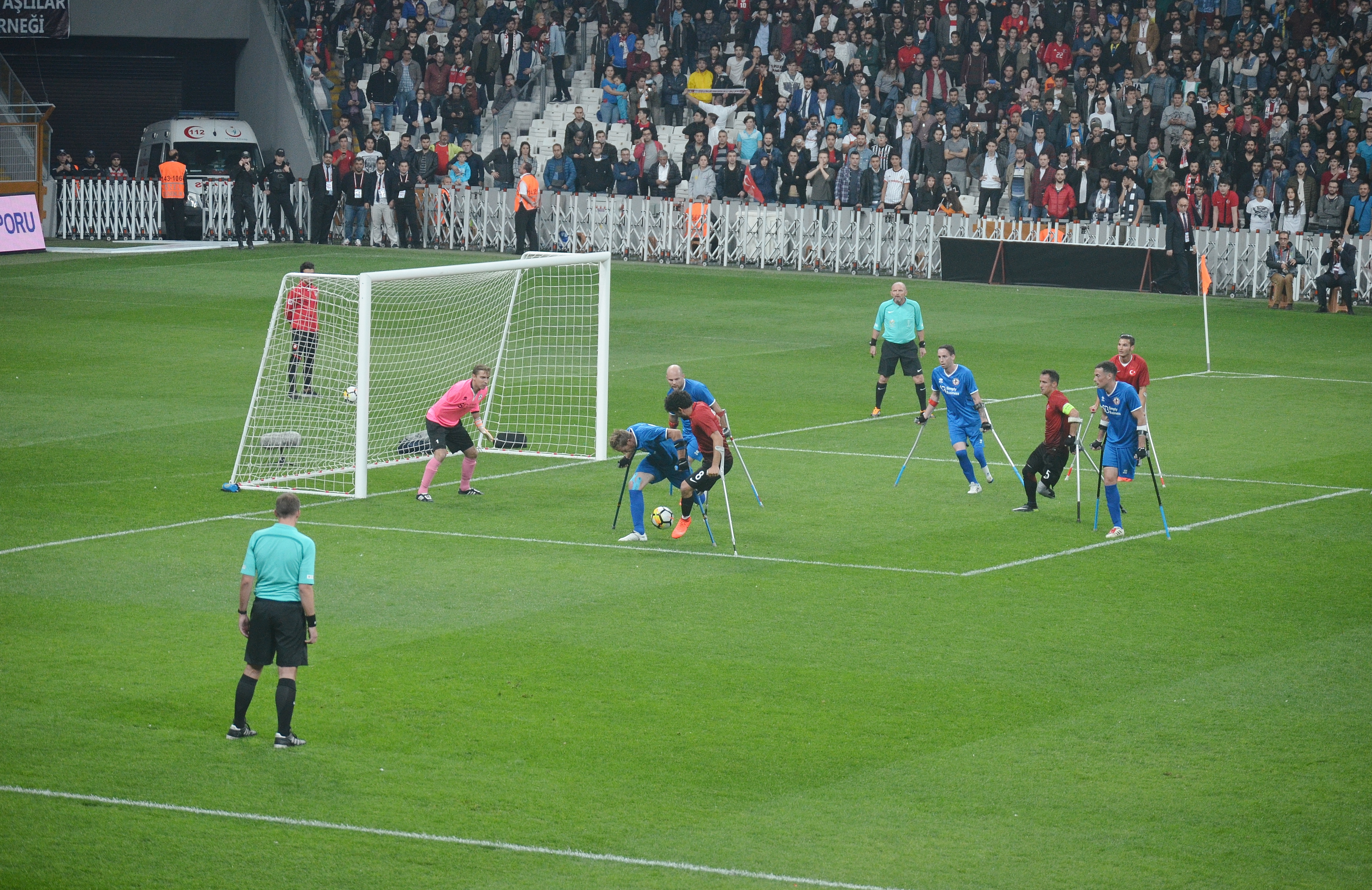
2017 European Amputee Football Championship final match between Turkey (red/black) and England (blue).

There are several amputee football associations around the world under the WAFF umbrella. A couple examples of this are the England Amputee Association and The Irish Amputee Football Association.

Each amputee football organization promotes the advancement of the sport and that it gains more recognition. The England Amputee Football Association states their main goal on their website as: "The England Amputee Football Association's aim is to provide all amputees, people with congenital limb deficiencies and persons with restricted use of limbs, with the opportunity to play football locally, nationally and internationally".

First official women games was played in 2024.

== WAFF members ==
52 nations in 2025:

1. Asia: 11
2. Europe: 15
3. North America: 5
4. South America: 6
5. Africa: 15
6. Oceania: 0

== Main competitions ==
=== Asian Amputee Football Championship ===
- 2022 West Asia Ranking: 1 Iran, 2 Uzbekistan, 3 Iraq, 4 Palestine, 5 India
- 2022 East Asia Ranking: 1 Japan, 2 Indonesia
- 2025 in Bangeladesh: 1 Uzbekistan 2 Indonesia 3 Iraq 4 Bangladesh 5 Nepal - February 7-12, 2025
- 2025 in Indonesia: 1 Iran 2 Uzbekistan 3 Japan 4 Iraq 5 Indonesia 6 Syria 7 Malaysia 8 Yemen 9 Bangladesh (Withdraw) - November 9-15

Asian Amputee Football Confederation (AAFC) - President: Masayuki Sugino - 11 nation members in 2025: BANGLADESH, INDIA, INDONESIA, IRAN, IRAQ, JAPAN, MALAYSIA, PALESTINE, SYRIA, UZBEKISTAN, YEMEN

=== Other championships ===
Year	Event	Host	Date	Gold	Silver	Bronze	4th place	Ref.
2012	1st Amp Futbol Cup	(Poland) Warsaw	Sep 8-9	England	Ukraine	Poland	Ireland	
2013	2nd Amp Futbol Cup	(Poland) Warsaw	Sep 7-8	England	Ukraine	Poland	Netherlands	
2014	3rd Amp Futbol Cup	(Poland) Warsaw	Sep 13-14	Turkey	England	Poland	Ukraine	
2015	4th Amp Futbol Cup	(Poland) Warsaw	Jun 6-7	Poland	Ireland	Ukraine	Netherlands	
2017	6th Amp Futbol Cup	(Poland) Warsaw	Jun 24-25	England	Poland	Japan		
2018	7th Amp Futbol Cup	(Belgium) Bruges	Oct 20-21	Greece	Belgium	Netherlands/Germany		
2024	1st African Para Games	(Ghana) Accra	Sep 4-10	Ghana	Morocco	Egypt	Angola	
2026	15th Amp Futbol Cup	(Poland) Warsaw	Jun 20-21	Poland	Ukraine	USA		

== Rules ==
The official FIFA sanctioned rules are:

- An amputee is defined as someone who is 'abbreviated' at or near the ankle or wrist.
- Outfield players may have two hands but only one leg, whereas goalkeepers may have two feet but only one hand.
- The game is played with metal crutches and without prostheses, the only exception being that bi-lateral amputees may play with a prosthesis.
- Players may not use crutches to advance, control or block the ball. Such an action will be penalised in the same way as a handball infringement, but an incidental contact between crutch and ball is tolerated.
- Players may not use their residual limbs to voluntarily advance, control or block the ball. Such an action will be penalised in the same way as a handball infringement, but an incidental contact between residual limb and ball is tolerated.
- Shin pads must be worn.
- Use of a crutch against a player will lead to ejection from the game and a penalty kick for the opposing team.
- The pitch measures a maximum of 70 x 60 metres.
- The dimensions of the goals are 2.2 metres maximum (height) x 5 metres maximum (width) x 1 metre (depth).
- A FIFA standard ball is used.
- Time: Games consist of two 25-minute halves (variable according to the tournament), with a ten-minute rest period in between.
- Both teams are allowed a two-minute time-out per game.
- Offside rules do not apply in amputee football.
- International rules stipulate that a team be made up of six outfield players and a goalkeeper. Certain tournaments, however, require teams of four outfield players plus goalkeeper, as was the case in Sierra Leone.
- Goalkeepers are not permitted to leave their area. Should this occur deliberately, the goalkeeper will be ejected from the game and the opposing team awarded a penalty kick.
- An unlimited number of substitutions can be made, at any point during the game.

== See also ==
- Amputee Football World Cup
- Team Zaryen
- European Amputee Football Federation
- Powerchair football
