= 2024 African Amputee Football Cup of Nations =

كأس أمم إفريقيا لمبتوري الأطراف 2024

Tournament details
- Host country: Egypt
- City: Cairo
- Dates: 18–27 May
- Teams: 13
- Venue: 2 (in 1 host city)

Final positions
- Champions: Ghana (1st title)
- Runners-up: Morocco
- Third place: Algeria
- Fourth place: Nigeria

Tournament statistics
- Matches played: 32
- Goals scored: 138 (4.31 per match)

The 2024 African Amputee Football Cup of Nations is the seventh edition of the international competition of amputee football national men's teams in Africa. It was organized by the Confederation of African Amputee Football (CAAF), and was held in Cairo, Egypt. The tournament was originally planned to be held from 19 to 28 April 2024, but was delayed for the following month, from 18 to 27 May. This tournament served as a qualification for the 2026 Amputee Football World Cup when the seventh first places will take a part to the world cup.

== Participating nations ==
- Algeria
- Angola
- Burundi
- Egypt (host)
- Gambia
- Ghana
- Kenya
- Liberia
- Morocco
- Nigeria
- Sierra Leone
- Tanzania
- Uganda
- Cameroon
- Senegal

Withrawal teams

- Cameroon
- Senegal
- Rwanda

== Group stage ==
=== Group A ===
Pos	Team	Pld	W	D	L	GF	GA	GD	Pts	Qualification
1	Nigeria	2	1	1	0	11	0	+11	4	Advance to knockout phase
2	Egypt (H)	2	1	1	0	10	2	+8	4	Advance to knockout phase
3	Burundi	2	0	0	2	2	21	−19	0	9-13th place classification play-offs

Rules for classification: Group stage tiebreakers
(H) Hosts
18 May 2024
19:00

Egypt	0–0	Nigeria

Al Salam Stadium, Cairo

20 May 2024
21:30

Egypt	10–2	Burundi

Katameya Club, Cairo

21 May 2024
17:00

Burundi	0–11	Nigeria

Katameya Club, Cairo

=== Group B ===
Pos	Team	Pld	W	D	L	GF	GA	GD	Pts	Qualification
1	Morocco	2	2	0	0	14	0	+14	6	Advance to knockout phase
2	Liberia	2	1	0	1	2	5	−3	3	Advance to knockout phase
3	Uganda	2	0	0	2	0	11	−11	0	9-16th place classification play-offs

Rules for classification: Group stage tiebreakers
19 May 2024
15:30

Liberia	2–0	Uganda

Katameya Club, Cairo

20 May 2024
15:30

Morocco	9–0	Uganda

Katameya Club, Cairo

21 May 2024
21:30

Liberia	0–5	Morocco

Katameya Club, Cairo

=== Group C ===
Pos	Team	Pld	W	D	L	GF	GA	GD	Pts	Qualification
1	Ghana	3	3	0	0	11	1	+10	9	Advance to knockout phase
2	Algeria	3	2	0	1	4	7	−3	6	Advance to knockout phase
3	(The Gambia) Gambia	3	1	0	2	5	9	−4	3	9-16th place classification play-offs
4	Kenya	3	0	0	3	3	6	−3	0	9-16th place classification play-offs

Rules for classification: Group stage tiebreakers
19 May 2024
15:30

Kenya	0–1	Algeria

Katameya Club, Cairo
19 May 2024
21:30

Ghana	4–0	(The Gambia) Gambia

Katameya Club, Cairo

20 May 2024
17:00

Ghana	5–0	Algeria

Katameya Club, Cairo
20 May 2024
20:00

Kenya	2–3	(The Gambia) Gambia

Katameya Club, Cairo

21 May 2024
15:30

Algeria	3–2	(The Gambia) Gambia

Katameya Club, Cairo
21 May 2024
20:00

Kenya	1–2	Ghana

Katameya Club, Cairo

=== Group D ===
Pos	Team	Pld	W	D	L	GF	GA	GD	Pts	Qualification
1	Angola	2	2	0	0	6	1	+5	6	Advance to knockout phase
2	Tanzania	2	1	0	1	3	2	+1	3	Advance to knockout phase
3	Sierra Leone	2	0	0	2	0	6	−6	0	9-16th place classification play-offs

Rules for classification: Group stage tiebreakers
19 May 2024
19:30

Angola	4–0	Sierra Leone

Katameya Club, Cairo

20 May 2024
18:30

Tanzania	2–0	Sierra Leone

Katameya Club, Cairo

21 May 2024
18:30

Angola	2–1	Tanzania

Katameya Club, Cairo

== Knockout phase ==
=== Bracket ===
Quarterfinals
23 May
Angola	1
Algeria	2
23 May
Ghana	4
Tanzania	1
23 May
Morocco	4
Egypt	2
23 May
Nigeria	2
Liberia	1

Semifinals
25 May
Algeria	0
Ghana	3
25 May
Morocco	6
Nigeria	2

Final
27 May
Ghana (a.e.t.)	2
Morocco	1
3rd place game
27 May
Algeria	3
Nigeria	1

=== Quarter-finals ===
23 May 2024
17:30

Angola	1–2	Algeria

Katameya Club, Cairo

23 May 2024
19:15

Ghana	4–1	Tanzania

Katameya Club, Cairo

23 May 2024
21:00

Morocco	4–2	Egypt

Katameya Club, Cairo

23 May 2024
22:45

Nigeria	2–1	Liberia

Katameya Club, Cairo

=== Semi-finals ===
25 May 2024
22:00

Algeria	0–3	Ghana

Katameya Club, Cairo

25 May 2024
20:30

Morocco	6–2	Nigeria

Katameya Club, Cairo

=== Third place game ===
27 May 2024
17:00

Algeria	3–1	Nigeria
Raouf Ouchène 32'; Lotfi Belkaid 41'; Aboubakr Zaidi 49'		Yusuf Isa 28' (pen.)

Katameya Petrosport Stadium, Cairo
Referee: Frédéric Ortiz (France)

=== Final ===
27 May 2024
20:30

Ghana	2–1 (a.e.t.)	Morocco
Mohamed Mubarak 44' (pen.), 57'		El Mustapha Hliouat 14'

Katameya Petrosport Stadium, Cairo
Referee: Paweł Susek (Poland)

== Classification play-offs ==
=== 5-8th place classification ===
5-8th place semifinals
25 May
Angola	1
Tanzania	0
25 May
Egypt	2
Liberia	3

5th place game
26 May
Angola	4
Liberia	1
7th place game
26 May
Tanzania	1
Egypt	2

==== 5-8th place games ====
25 May 2024
18:45

Angola	1–0	Tanzania

Katameya Club, Cairo

25 May 2024
17:00

Egypt	2–3	Liberia

Katameya Club, Cairo

==== Seventh place game ====
26 May 2024
20:00

Tanzania	1–2	Egypt

Katameya Club, Cairo

==== Fifth place game ====
26 May 2024
22:00

Angola	4–1	Liberia

Katameya Club, Cairo

=== 9-13th place classification ===
9-13th place quarterfinals
Sierra Leone	0
Kenya	2

9-12th place semifinals
Kenya	0
(The Gambia) Gambia	1
Uganda	3
Burundi	1

9th place game
(The Gambia) Gambia	5
Uganda	2
11th place game
Kenya	3
Burundi	2

==== 9-13th place game ====
23 May 2024
16:00

Sierra Leone	0–2	Kenya

Katameya Club, Cairo

==== 9-12th place games ====
24 May 2024
--:--

Kenya	0–1	(The Gambia) Gambia

Katameya Club, Cairo

24 May 2024
--:--

Uganda	3–1	Burundi

Katameya Club, Cairo

==== 11th place game ====
26 May 2024
16:00

Kenya	3–2	Burundi

Katameya Club, Cairo

==== 9th place game ====
26 May 2024
18:00

Gambia (The Gambia)	5–2	Uganda

Katameya Club, Cairo

== Rankings ==
Rank	Team	2026 Amputee Football WC
1	Ghana	Qualified teams
2	Morocco	Qualified teams
3	Algeria	Qualified teams
4	Nigeria	Qualified teams
5	Angola	Qualified teams
6	Liberia	Qualified teams
7	Egypt	Qualified teams
8	Tanzania	
9	(The Gambia) Gambia	
10	Uganda	
11	Kenya	
12	Burundi	
13	Sierra Leone	

== Awards ==
- Best player: (Ghana) Mohamed Mubarak
- Best goalscorer: (Morocco) Mohcine Charhar (12 goals)
- Best goalkeeper: (Morocco) Youness Akdal
- Best coach: (Ghana) Richard Stephen Obeng
- Best referee: (France) Frédéric Ortiz
- Fairplay team: Sierra Leone
