= African Amputee Football Cup of Nations =

Athletic competition

- Status: Active
- Genre: Sports event
- Years active: 18
- Inaugurated: 2007
- Previous event: 2024
- Organiser: CAAF

The African Amputee Football Cup of Nations, also called AAFCON, is an African tournament in association football for amputee people. It is organized by the Confederation of African Amputee Football (CAAF). It was first held in 2007 in Freetown, Sierra Leone. The last one was held in Cairo, Egypt in 2024.

== Competitions by year ==
Number	Year	Host city	Teams	Gold	Silver	Bronze	4th place
1	2007	(Sierra Leone) Freetown	4	Ghana	Liberia	Sierra Leone	Sierra Leone
2	2008	(Liberia) Monrovia	4	Liberia	Sierra Leone	Angola	Nigeria
3	2011	(Ghana) Accra	6	Liberia	Ghana	Angola	Sierra Leone
4	2013	(Kenya) Nairobi	6	Liberia	Angola	Ghana	Nigeria
5	2019	(Angola) Benguela	6	Angola	Nigeria	Liberia	Tanzania
6	2021	(Tanzania) Dar es Salaam	15	Ghana	Liberia	Angola	Tanzania
7	2024	(Egypt) Cairo	13	Ghana	Morocco	Algeria	Nigeria

== Medals summary ==
Rank	Nation	Gold	Silver	Bronze	Total
1	Liberia	3	2	1	6
2	Ghana	3	1	1	5
3	Angola	1	1	3	5
4	Sierra Leone	0	1	1	2
5	Morocco	0	1	0	1
5	Nigeria	0	1	0	1
7	Algeria	0	0	1	1
Totals (7 entries)		7	7	7	21

== Participating nations ==
Team	(Sierra Leone) 2007	(Liberia) 2008	(Ghana) 2011	(Kenya) 2013	(Angola) 2019	(Tanzania) 2021	(Egypt) 2024	Years
Algeria	×	×	×	×	×	×	3rd	1
Angola	×	3rd	3rd	2nd	1st	3rd	QF	6
Burundi	×	×	×	×	×	×	GS	1
Cameroon	×	×	×	×	GS	QF	×	2
Egypt	×	×	×	×	×	QF	QF	2
Ethiopia	×	×	×	×	×	GS	×	1
Kenya	×	×	×	GS	×	QF	GS	3
Liberia	2nd	1st	1st	1st	3rd	2nd	QF	7
Gambia	×	×	×	×	×	GS	GS	2
Ghana	1st	×	2nd	3rd	×	1st	1st	5
Niger	×	×	GS	×	×	×	×	1
Nigeria	×	4th	GS	4th	2nd	GS	4th	6
Morocco	×	×	×	×	×	QF	2nd	2
Rwanda	×	×	×	×	×	GS	×	1
Sierra Leone	3rd	2nd	4th	GS	GS	GS	GS	7
Tanzania	×	×	×	×	4th	4th	QF	3
Uganda	×	×	×	×	×	GS	GS	2
Zanzibar	×	×	×	×	×	GS	×	1
Total	3	4	6	6	6	15	13	

Legend

- 1st – Champions
- 2nd – Runners-up
- 3rd – Third place
- 4th – Fourth place
- QF – Quarter-finals
- GS – Group stage
- FR – Final round
- Q – Qualified for upcoming tournament
- •• — Qualified but withdrew / Disqualified after qualification
- • — Did not qualify
- × — Did not enter / Withdrew / Disqualified
- — Hosts

== See also ==
- Amputee football
- Amputee Football World Cup
