= 2013 African Amputee Football Cup of Nations =

Tournament details
- Host country: Kenya
- City: Nairobi
- Dates: 5–11 Dec
- Teams: 6
- Venue: 1

Final positions
- Champions: Liberia (3rd title)
- Runners-up: Angola
- Third place: Ghana
- Fourth place: Nigeria

Tournament statistics
- Matches played: 10
- Goals scored: 30 (3 per match)

The 2013 African Amputee Football Cup of Nations was the 4th edition of the international competition of amputee football national men's teams in Africa. It was organized by the Amputee Football Federation of Africa (AFFA), and was held in Nairobi, Kenya between 5 and 11 December 2013.

Liberia won the title for the third time, defeating Angola in the final. Ghana became bronze medalist.

== Participating nations ==
Six nations competed in the preliminary round-robin tournament in two groups. Top two teams of each group qualified for the knockout stage.

- Angola
- Ghana
- Kenya
- Liberia
- Nigeria
- Sierra Leone

== Preliminary round ==
=== Group A ===
Team	Pld	W	D	L	GF	GA	GD	P
Ghana	2	2	0	0	4	2	+2	6
Nigeria	2	1	0	1	2	2	0	3
Kenya	2	0	0	2	3	5	-2	0

6 December 2013
	Kenya	(Kenya)	1 - 2	(Nigeria)	Nigeria	City Stadium
8 December 2013
	Ghana	(Ghana)	1 - 0	(Nigeria)	Nigeria	City Stadium
9 December 2013
	Kenya	(Kenya)	2 - 3	(Ghana)	Ghana	City Stadium

=== Group B ===
Team	Pld	W	D	L	GF	GA	GD	P
Angola	2	1	1	0	7	2	+5	4
Liberia	2	1	1	0	2	1	+1	4
Sierra Leone	2	0	0	2	1	7	-6	0

6 December 2013
	Liberia	(Liberia)	1 - 1	(Angola)	Angola	City Stadium
8 December 2013
	Angola	(Angola)	6 - 1	(Sierra Leone)	Sierra Leone	City Stadium
9 December 2013
	Liberia	(Liberia)	1 - 0	(Sierra Leone)	Sierra Leone	City Stadium

== Knockout stage ==
Semi-finals
A1	Ghana	0
B2	Liberia	1
B1	Angola	1 (pen.)
A2	Nigeria	1 (pen.)

Gold medal
B2	Liberia	2
B1	Angola	1
Bronze medal
A1	Ghana	3
A2	Nigeria	2

Semi-finals

10 December 2013
	Ghana	(Ghana)	0 – 1	(Liberia)	Liberia	City Stadium
	Angola	(Angola)	1 – 1 (pen.)	(Nigeria)	Nigeria	City Stadium

3rd place

11 December 2013
	Ghana	(Ghana)	3 – 2	(Nigeria)	Nigeria	City Stadium

Final

11 December 2013
	Liberia	(Liberia)	2 – 1	(Angola)	Angola	City Stadium

== Rankings ==
Rank	Team
1	Liberia
2	Angola
3	Ghana
4	Nigeria
5	Kenya
6	Sierra Leone

2013 African Amputee Football Cup of Nations

Liberia
Third title
