= 2008 African Amputee Football Cup of Nations =

Tournament details
- Host country: Liberia
- City: Monrovia
- Dates: 30 Mar – 6 Apr
- Teams: 4
- Venue: 1

Final positions
- Champions: Liberia (1st title)
- Runners-up: Sierra Leone
- Third place: Angola
- Fourth place: Nigeria

Tournament statistics
- Matches played: 10
- Goals scored: 16 (1.6 per match)

The 2008 African Amputee Football Cup of Nations was the 2nd edition of the international competition of amputee football national men's teams in Africa. It was organized by the Amputee Football Federation of Africa (AFFA), and was held in Monrovia, Liberia between 30 March and 6 April 2008.

Liberia won the title for the first time, defeating Sierra Leone in the final. Angola became bronze medalist.

== Participating nations ==
Four nations competed in the tournament. All of them qualified for the knockout stage.

- Angola
- Liberia
- Nigeria
- Sierra Leone

== Preliminary round ==
Team	Pld	W	D	L	GF	GA	GD	P
Nigeria	3	2	0	1	4	3	+1	6
Liberia	3	2	0	1	4	1	+3	6
Sierra Leone	3	1	1	1	5	5	0	4
Angola	3	0	1	2	2	6	-4	1

30 March 2008
14:00 GMT	Liberia	(Liberia)	2 - 0	(Sierra Leone)	Sierra Leone	Antoinette Tubman Stadium
31 March 2008
14:00 GMT	Angola	(Angola)	2 - 2	(Sierra Leone)	Sierra Leone	Antoinette Tubman Stadium
16:00 GMT	Liberia	(Liberia)	0 - 1	(Nigeria)	Nigeria	Antoinette Tubman Stadium
1 April 2008
16:00 GMT	Sierra Leone	(Sierra Leone)	3 - 1	(Nigeria)	Nigeria	Antoinette Tubman Stadium
2 April 2008
16:00 GMT	Nigeria	(Nigeria)	2 - 0	(Angola)	Angola	Antoinette Tubman Stadium
3 April 2008
16:00 GMT	Liberia	(Liberia)	2 - 0	(Angola)	Angola	Antoinette Tubman Stadium

== Knockout stage ==
Semi-finals
1	Nigeria	0 (4)
2	Liberia	0 (5)
3	Sierra Leone	0 (4)
4	Angola	0 (3)

Gold medal
2	Liberia	1
3	Sierra Leone	0
Bronze medal
1	Nigeria	0 (4)
4	Angola	0 (5)

Semi-finals

4 April 2008
14:00 GMT	Nigeria	(Nigeria)	0 – 0 (pen. 4 – 5)	(Liberia)	Liberia	Antoinette Tubman Stadium
16:00 GMT	Sierra Leone	(Sierra Leone)	0 – 0 (pen. 4 – 3)	(Angola)	Angola	Antoinette Tubman Stadium

3rd place

6 April 2008
14:00 GMT	Nigeria	(Nigeria)	0 – 0 (pen. 4 – 5)	(Angola)	Angola	Antoinette Tubman Stadium

Final

6 April 2008
16:00 GMT	Liberia	(Liberia)	1 – 0	(Sierra Leone)	Sierra Leone	Antoinette Tubman Stadium

== Rankings ==
Rank	Team
1	Liberia
2	Sierra Leone
3	Angola
4	Nigeria

2008 African Amputee Football Cup of Nations

Liberia
First title
