= 2011 African Amputee Football Cup of Nations =

Tournament details
- Host country: Ghana
- City: Accra
- Dates: 19–26 Nov
- Teams: 6
- Venue: 1

Final positions
- Champions: Liberia (2nd title)
- Runners-up: Ghana
- Third place: Angola
- Fourth place: Sierra Leone

Tournament statistics
- Matches played: 10
- Top scorer: (Ghana) Collins Gyamfi
- Best player: (Liberia) Festus Harrison

The 2011 African Amputee Football Cup of Nations was the 3rd edition of the international competition of amputee football national men's teams in Africa. It was organized by the Amputee Football Federation of Africa (AFFA), and was held in Accra, Ghana between 19 and 26 November 2011.

Liberia won the title for the second time, defeating Ghana in the final. Angola became bronze medalist.

== Participating nations ==
Six nations competed in the preliminary round-robin tournament in two groups. Top two teams of each group qualified for the knockout stage.

- Angola
- Ghana
- Liberia
- Niger
- Nigeria
- Sierra Leone

== Preliminary round ==
=== Group A ===
Team	Pld	W	D	L	GF	GA	GD	P
Sierra Leone	2	2	0	0	?	?	?	6
Ghana	2	1	0	1	12	2	+10	3
Niger	2	0	0	2	?	?	?	0

20 November 2011
	Ghana	(Ghana)	1 - 2	(Sierra Leone)	Sierra Leone	Accra Technical Training Centre
21 November 2011
	Sierra Leone	(Sierra Leone)	W - L	(Niger)	Niger	Accra Technical Training Centre
23 November 2011
	Ghana	(Ghana)	11 - 0	(Niger)	Niger	Accra Technical Training Centre

=== Group B ===
Team	Pld	W	D	L	GF	GA	GD	P
Angola	2	2	0	0	?	?	?	6
Liberia	2	0	1	1	1	2	-1	1
Nigeria	2	0	1	1	?	?	?	1

20 November 2011
	Angola	(Angola)	1 - 0	(Liberia)	Liberia	Accra Technical Training Centre
21 November 2011
	Angola	(Angola)	W - L	(Nigeria)	Nigeria	Accra Technical Training Centre
23 November 2011
	Liberia	(Liberia)	1 - 1	(Nigeria)	Nigeria	Accra Technical Training Centre

== Knockout stage ==
Semi-finals
A1	Sierra Leone	0 (3)
B2	Liberia	0 (4)
B1	Angola	0
A2	Ghana	2

Gold medal
B2	Liberia	3 (4)
A2	Ghana	3 (2)
Bronze medal
A1	Sierra Leone	0
B1	Angola	3

Semi-finals

25 November 2011
	Sierra Leone	(Sierra Leone)	0 – 0 (pen. 3 – 4)	(Liberia)	Liberia	Accra Technical Training Centre
	Ghana	(Ghana)	2 – 0	(Angola)	Angola	Accra Technical Training Centre

3rd place

26 November 2011
	Sierra Leone	(Sierra Leone)	0 – 3	(Angola)	Angola	Accra Technical Training Centre

Final

26 November 2011
	Liberia	(Liberia)	3 – 3 (pen. 4 – 2)	(Ghana)	Ghana	Accra Technical Training Centre

== Rankings ==
Rank	Team
1	Liberia
2	Ghana
3	Angola
4	Sierra Leone
5	Nigeria
6	Niger

2011 African Amputee Football Cup of Nations

Liberia
Second title
