= 2007 African Amputee Football Cup of Nations =

Tournament details
- Host country: Sierra Leone
- City: Freetown
- Dates: 9–14 Feb
- Teams: 4

Final positions
- Champions: Ghana (1st title)
- Runners-up: Liberia
- Third place: Sierra Leone
- Fourth place: Sierra Leone

Tournament statistics
- Matches played: 10
- Goals scored: 39 (3.9 per match)
- Top scorer: (Ghana) Collins Gyamfi (10 goals)
- Best player: (Sierra Leone) Amadou Kamara

The 2007 African Amputee Football Cup of Nations was the 1st edition of the international competition of amputee football national men's teams in Africa. It was organized by the Amputee Football Federation of Africa (AFFA), and was held in Freetown, Sierra Leone between 9 and 14 February 2007.

Ghana won the title for the first time, defeating Liberia in the final. Sierra Leone became bronze medalist.

== Participating nations ==
Three nations competed in the tournament. Sierra Leone was represented by two teams: Team A and Team B. All of them qualified for the knockout stage.

- Ghana
- Liberia
- Sierra Leone

== Preliminary round ==
Team	Pld	W	D	L	GF	GA	GD	P
Sierra Leone (Team A)	3	2	1	0	5	0	+5	7
Ghana	3	2	0	1	7	5	+2	6
Sierra Leone (Team B)	3	1	1	1	5	3	+2	4
Liberia	3	0	0	3	0	9	-9	0

9 February 2007
	Sierra Leone (Team A)	(Sierra Leone)	3 - 0	(Ghana)	Ghana	National Stadium
	Sierra Leone (Team B)	(Sierra Leone)	3 - 0	(Liberia)	Liberia	National Stadium
10 February 2007
	Ghana	(Ghana)	3 - 2	(Sierra Leone)	Sierra Leone (Team B)	National Stadium
	Sierra Leone (Team A)	(Sierra Leone)	2 - 0	(Liberia)	Liberia	National Stadium
11 February 2007
	Sierra Leone (Team A)	(Sierra Leone)	0 - 0	(Sierra Leone)	Sierra Leone (Team B)	National Stadium
	Ghana	(Ghana)	4 - 0	(Liberia)	Liberia	National Stadium

== Knockout stage ==
Semi-finals
1	Sierra Leone (Team A)	2
2	Ghana	3
3	Sierra Leone (Team B)	0
4	Liberia	3

Gold medal
2	Ghana	4
4	Liberia	3
Bronze medal
1	Sierra Leone (Team A)	6
3	Sierra Leone (Team B)	1

Semi-finals

13 February 2007
	Sierra Leone (Team A)	(Sierra Leone)	2 – 3	(Ghana)	Ghana	National Stadium
	Sierra Leone (Team B)	(Sierra Leone)	0 – 3	(Liberia)	Liberia	National Stadium

3rd place

14 February 2007
	Sierra Leone (Team A)	(Sierra Leone)	6 – 1	(Sierra Leone)	Sierra Leone (Team B)	National Stadium

Final

14 February 2007
	Ghana	(Ghana)	4 – 3	(Liberia)	Liberia	National Stadium

== Rankings ==
Rank	Team
1	Ghana
2	Liberia
3	Sierra Leone
4	Sierra Leone

2007 African Amputee Football Cup of Nations

Ghana
First title

== Exhibition match ==
12 February 2007
	Sierra Leone (Team A)	(Sierra Leone)	3 – 0	(Nigeria)	Nigeria	National Stadium
