= Filiz =

- Gender: Feminine
- Language: Turkish

Origin
- Language: Turkish
- Origin: "filiz"
- Derivation: "filiz"
- Meaning: "burgeon", "Blossom", "to flower"

Filiz is a common feminine Turkish given name. In Turkish, "Filiz" means "Sprout", "Blossom" and/or "to Flower"; derived from the Greek word "fillís" (φυλλίς).

== Given name ==
- Filiz Ahmet (born 1981), Macedonian-Turkish stage and screen actress
- Filiz Akın (1943–2025), Turkish film actress, writer and television presenter
- Filiz Ali (born in 1937), Turkish pianist and musicologist
- Filiz Dinçmen (born 1939), First Turkish female Ambassador to a foreign country
- Filiz Hyusmenova (born 1966), Bulgarian politician of Turkish descent and Member of the European Parliament
- Filiz İşikırık (born 1993), Turkish footballer
- Filiz Kadoğan (born 1982), Turkish shot putter
- Filiz Kocaman (born 1985), Turkish volleyball player
- Filiz Koç (born in 1986), Turkish-German footballer, model and sports reporter
- Filiz Koçali (born 1958), Turkish politician
- Filiz Polat (born 1978), Turkish-German politician
- Filiz Taçbaş (born 1964), Turkish actress and former national tennis player
- Filiz Vural (born 1953), Turkish beauty contestant and Miss Europe 1971

== Surname ==
- Atalay Filiz (born 1986), Turkish murderer and fugitive
