= 11th millennium BC =

Millennium between 11,000 BC and 10,001 BC

The 11th millennium BC spanned the years 11,000 BC to 10,001 BC (c. 13 ka to c. 12 ka or 12,950 BP to 11,951 BP). This millennium is during the ending phase of the Upper Paleolithic or Epipaleolithic period. It is impossible to date events that happened during this millennium, and all dates associated with this millennium are estimates based on geological analysis, anthropological analysis, and radiometric dating.

== Animals ==
The ability to sail was not only a Neolithic creation. Franchthi Cave provides indirect evidence of pre-Neolithic (11th Millennium BC) seafaring, as well as the early Holocene Mesolithic colonization of Corsica and other Mediterranean islands. It is possible to investigate the question posed by Cauvin's research in regard to both sides of the Middle Eastern and Çatalhöyük data. The first part focuses on the evidence from the Middle East as a whole and discusses the elements involved in the development of established settlements beginning in the 11th millennium BC. The assertion can, however, also be examined in light of the domestication of cattle at Çatalhöyük itself in the 7th millennium BC (c. 9 ka or 8950 BP).

According to zooarchaeological research, the earliest known domestication of animals took place in the Near East during the Pre-Pottery Neolithic A (PPNB) period, in the middle of the 11th millennium BC. This includes the domestication of goats, which are believed to have been among the earliest livestock animals in the Zagros Mountains of modern-day Iran, close to the Fertile Crescent, considerably later (10,000 years ago). One of the most important resources in dry nations is dung, which is used by traditional societies all over the world for construction, cooking, heating, and decoration. It is widely believed that similar events occurred in the past, particularly following the domestication of herbivores in the 11th millennium BC. There is ample evidence that the heads of bulls—skulls and bucrania—or their horns—are revered as representations of masculine power and authority. The oldest known sanctuary dates back to the early 10th millennium BC and is located in Göbekli Tepe in Southeastern Turkey.

Only archaeozoological research and excavations have revealed the oldest indications of Aegean aquatic environments being used for human purposes, which go all the way back to the Mesolithic (11th millennium BC). These locations are the open-settlement Maroulas on the island of Kythnos, Cave Cyclops on Gioura, and Cave Franchthi in the Argolid. As early as the 9th millennium BC, the Fertile Crescent's sedentary early food-producing societies served as hubs for "experimental" pre-domestic animal management techniques. Furthermore, by the end of the 9th millennium BC, morphologically wild cattle had been brought to Cyprus, serving as a terminus ante quem for pre-domestic cow management. This prompts us to speculate that early sedentary towns from the PPNA and EPPNB, which date to the 10th and early 9th millennium BC, and possibly even the Younger Dryas (11th millennium BC), conducted early cow husbandry in a variety of ways. Geographically, scientists proposed that numerous modern communities in the Jordan Valley, the Mediterranean coast, the upper Euphrates and Tigris valleys, and central Anatolia developed distinct, local management traditions. Among other things, the island of Lemnos has some of the Aegean Sea's earliest hunter-fisherman villages, dating to the 11th millennium BC.

== Beginnings of agriculture ==
The Klementowice inventory is a member of the Magdalenian technocomplex, according to a typological examination. The frequency of the basic tool groups (end-scrapers, burins, truncated pieces, backed pieces, perforators, and combined tools) is most closely matched by that in Moravian inventories, which J. K. dated to horizon II of the Magdalenian culture in Central Europe and to the end of the 13th (c. 15 ka or 14,950 BP) to early 11th millennium BC. The presence of arched backed blades may contest the dating of the entire inventory of the Bling Interstadial. It is necessary to reevaluate the circumstances surrounding the formation of sedentary farming communities in Southeast Turkey in light of the discovery of a native Epipalaeolithic tradition. While the construction traditions were distinct, the establishment of sedentary populations during the Younger Dryas period here is similar to that of the Levant during the Natufian. The precise role that the intricate interactions between indigenous advancements and cross-regional cultural interchange played in the surprisingly early flowering of sedentary societies in Upper Mesopotamia in the 11th and 10th millennium BC is still unknown.

Barley first appeared in the Anatolian Peninsula between the 8th and 7th millennium BC. Traces of its cultivation can be found in Europe between the 6th and 5th millennium BC, and evidence of its wild forms dates to between the 12th and 11th millennium BC. Over the next few centuries, barley spread throughout a significant portion of Europe. The most prevalent architectural features in lower Kurdistan are mudbrick walls and facades, which are also seen in the most researched archeological sites, such as Chermo (7th millennium BC) and Béstan Súr (11th millennium BC). These climatic and material traits have persisted and are now crucial components of regionally viable adaptation.

They have characterized archaeological tools from the Natuian period to the Late Pre-Pottery Neolithic B period, from the 11th to the late 8th millennium BC, using these experimental measures in a number of Near Eastern sites. According to scientific research, the Middle Euphrates was most likely the site of wild cereal cultivation in the 11th millennium BC. Several stages of this change can be identified when considering gloss texture analysis in conjunction with the existing archaeobotanical data. In Hayonim Terrace (12th millennium BC), unripe harvesting predominates, which suggests that wild grains in natural stands are being exploited. It is possible that human societies were already taking advantage of partially managed cereal fields that permitted the harvesting of plants in a semi-ripe stage, in addition to harvesting natural stands, based on the discovery of semi-ripe and unripe cereal cutting in the Middle Euphrates during the 11th millennium BC.

Several stages of this change can be identified by combining the existing archaeobotanical data with gloss texture analysis. The prevalence of immature harvesting in Hayonim Terrace (12th millennium BC) suggests that wild grains were being used in their natural stands. The finding of semi-ripe and unripe cereal cutting in the Middle Euphrates during the 11th millennium BC implies that human societies may have begun to utilize early managed cereal fields, which permitted the harvesting of semi-ripe plants, in addition to natural stands. Harvesting near-ripe semi-green wild grains at the 23,000 year old Ohalo II site using the traditional qualitative usewear approach fits well with the evidence for the site's earliest known cereal cultivation, the authors say. The comparison of the archaeological and experimental gloss, however, does not support the identification of this activity because no trials on harvesting grown wild grains were included in the study's reference collection.

Furthermore, it is impossible to determine the exact type of plant that was harvested from the archeological artifacts because of the poor development of the use-wear polish. At Ohalo II, wild cereal extraction is well-documented. However, other well-known ethnographical methods of collection, including as hand plucking, beating, and uprooting, could have been employed instead of sickle harvesting. Sickles are an indicator of the intensification of cereal exploitation that, as far as we currently know, started during the Natufian period, when glossed tools are relatively common in archaeological sites, and allow for the quick collection of cereals in the field (given close spacing of the stems and fairly similar stage of maturity).

== Pottery ==
Since diagnostic artifacts from the Jōmon period of Japanese prehistory contain pottery and polished stone tools, this period, which spans from the 11th millennium BC to roughly 300 BC (c. 2.3 ka or 2,250 BP), has been regarded as the Neolithic in the tradition of North-eastern Asian archaeology. With the use of shellfish, fish, nuts, and roots, the subsistence pattern can instead be thought of in more generic terms as Mesolithic.

== Other cultural developments ==
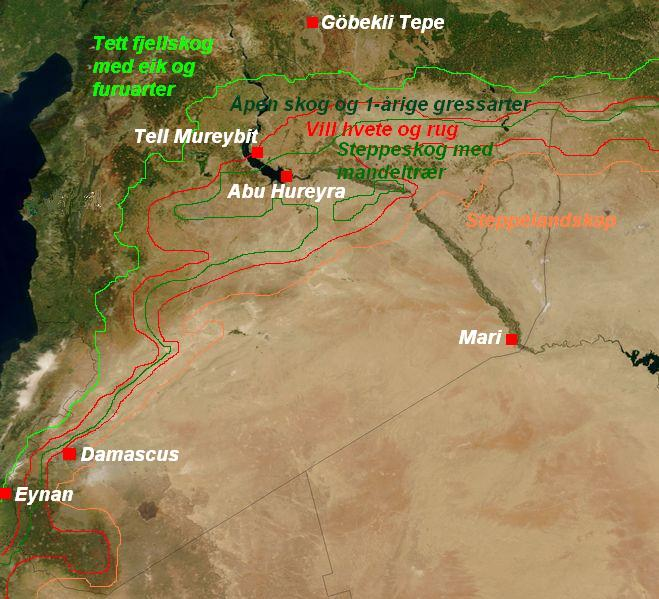
Fertile Crescent wood sones 11,000 BC (in Norwegian)

=== Near East ===
There are several later masseboth that exist today, mostly Nabatean ones. This bulk reveals that masseboth initially arrived in the desert during the 11th millennium BC, became increasingly common starting in the 6th millennium BC (c. 8 ka or 7,950 BP), and maintained their dominance there until the early Islamic period. They typically outnumbered people from the rest of the Near East by a significant margin. However, despite being well-established in the desert for many millennia, masseboth did not become widespread in the fertile zone until the early 2nd millennium BC. The Körtiktepe people principally obtained obsidian from numerous outcrops on the Bingöl and Nemrut Dağ massifs around the late 11th–early 10th millennium BC. The information also points to a minor difference in the way these materials were transported, with Bingöl B (calc-alkaline) materials arriving at the site as part-worked cobbles and/or prefabricated cores, and Bingöl A and Nemrut Dağ peralkaline obsidian coming as cortical nodules.

Körtiktepe and Gusir Höyük, two other very early Neolithic Anatolian sites in the Tigris basin, may offer helpful analogies for some of the behaviors at Direkli. The earliest levels at Körtiktepe date to the late 11th millennium BC (10,400–10,200 cal BC, through the transition to the Holocene), and Güsir is also likely to be equally early based on similarities to Körtik. Both of these sites date to the Epipalaeolithic/very early Neolithic. The number and variety of Körtiktepe's ornaments are noteworthy; some were mass-produced in the tens or hundreds of thousands and frequently included the funeral assemblage at the site.

Zeder and Spitzer (2016) deviated from this pattern, classifying the buildings according to their radiocarbon dates. Building level (BL) 3 is the oldest, dating to the late 11th and early 10th millennium BC. Because of this, Körtiktepe presents a unique chance to study the changes in subsistence and cultural practices that occurred at the Pleistocene-Holocene border in a single place. The goal of zooarchaeological research conducted across this boundary is to comprehend the extent of continuity throughout the site's occupation, the way that the local fauna was affected by this climate improvement, and the way that the Körtiktepe community responded to these possible changes in their local environment and related animal resources. The hypothesis of close relationships with the Syro-Mesopotamian communities circa 6000 BC is reinforced by the recent discovery of a longitudinally grooved stone at Kiçik Tepe, which is an artifact otherwise known only in the Middle Euphrates and Zagros foothills from the 11th millennium BC, and a small number of painted pottery sherds at Haci Elamxanlı Tepe.

There is evidence that neighboring Anatolia and the Near East used native and mineral copper far earlier than the Balkans. The earliest known instance is from Shanidar Cave, an Epipalaeolithic burial site from the 11th millennium BC, where a malachite bead was left as a grave sacrifice. By the 9th millennium BC, there had been a growing amount of work done with native copper and copper minerals. One such site was Çayönü Tepesi in eastern Turkey, which also produced evidence of native copper annealing. Although the utilization of this rich copper mineralization source has not yet been demonstrated, this hamlet was ideally situated close to Ergani Maden. By 6000 BC, the Levant, Transcaucasia, the Balkans, Iran, and Pakistan had all adopted the usage of copper resources, extending beyond its original "core" zone in Anatolia and northern Mesopotamia. It is evident that there is a substantial correlation between intensive usage of copper minerals and agriculture, which has been explained by the significance of copper's green color in relation to agricultural productivity. The research conducted by Bar-Yosef Mayer and Porat also demonstrated that the Near Eastern (Pre)Neolithic communities were not limited to copper minerals as they also desired decorations made of apatite, turquoise, amazonite, or serpentinite for their aesthetic qualities.

There is evidence that the Near East and neighboring Anatolia used native and mineral copper far earlier than the Balkans. The earliest known instance is from Shanidar Cave, an Epipalaeolithic burial site from the 11th millennium BC, where a malachite bead was left as a grave sacrifice. By the 9th millennium BC, there was a growing exploitation of native copper and copper minerals, as demonstrated by the settlement of Çayönü Tepesi in eastern Turkey, which also produced evidence for native copper annealing. Though it hasn't been shown that prehistoric people used this source of rich copper mineralization, this settlement was ideally situated close to Ergani Maden's outcrop. By 6000 BC, the Levant, Transcaucasia, the Balkans, Iran, and Pakistan are included in the "core" zone of copper mineral use, which originated in Anatolia and northern Mesopotamia. Bar-Yosef Mayer and Porat (2008) have suggested that the high correlation between excessive usage of copper minerals and agriculture can be attributed to the potent symbolism of the color green in relation to agricultural fertility. Their research also revealed that the Near Eastern (Pre)Neolithic communities did not only value copper minerals; ornaments crafted from apatite, turquoise, amazonite, or serpentinite were also produced, and these materials were probably prized for their aesthetic qualities.

=== Europe and Russia ===
Although this is the earliest Melian obsidian that we have found on Crete, the use of these raw materials for distant labor has a longer history, having been used by populations from mainland Greece in the Upper Palaeolithic period of the 11th millennium BC. The Kazachka site provides a unique collection of data spanning the era between 10,000 and 1000 BC. Data from the 11th millennium BC are available from the Ust-Karenga site. Mehmet Özdoğan summarizes new findings made around Anatolia. Previously seen of as the recipient of ideas from the south-eastern Neolithic, Anatolia is today recognized as a social-economic hub that inspires its neighbors. There is a plethora of convincing evidence pointing to a Neolithic that began to emerge at the end of the 11th millennium BC, spanning several locations, and developed into unique identities. These areas are represented by unique structures, shrines, artwork, and artifacts that reflect their various economic and religious systems. The Epipalaeolithic site of Ouriakos, which dates to approximately the middle of the 11th millennium BC, was found in the southeast of the island in 2006. This discovery fundamentally altered our understanding of the oldest occupation of this region of the Aegean.

The site's links with the eastern Mediterranean and the Aegean are very intriguing due to the large proportion of blade cores and blades and the presence of geometric inserts like lunates. There is strong evidence that Ŗküzini Ia1–Ia2, Ouriakos, and Kocaman may be roughly on the same historical horizon, despite some technological distinctions in the core reduction procedures and the proportion of diverse instruments. Similarities between Öküzini Ia1–Ia2 and Ouriakos have already been pointed up by Efstratiou, Biagi, and Starnini. These authors hypothesized that these sites would have been connected to Antalya and the northern Aegean throughout the Younger Dryas period due to a shared cultural ancestor. These techno-typological resemblances lead us to hypothesize that Kocaman lived in the late 11th millennium BC, making him roughly contemporaneous with Ouriakos.

Our understanding of the PPNA's features is primarily based on evidence gathered from the Upper Tigris Basin, where the earliest settlements date back to the late 11th millennium BC. After removing the samples with significantly larger deviations, radiocarbon dates from the towns of Hallan Çemi and Körtik Tepe indicate that the earliest settlements appeared between the late Younger Dryas and the early Holocene. Çemka and Boncuklu Tarla are also mentioned as having an analogous early stratum. Furthermore, the bedrock has not yet been reached at Hallan Çemi and Gusir Höyük, and the phases that have been excavated in the majority of the villages have not yet undergone rigorous dating. Moreover, it is challenging to establish a precise site chronology for sites that have a similar location but have moved over short distances, as is the case with Gusir Höyük (Qermez Dere) and Nemrik 9 to the south.

Despite all of these issues, the excavated sites in Southeast Anatolia show that about the 10th millennium BC, groups that have begun to settle year-round or for the majority of the year, start to form. The PPNB and the period following 8800 cal BC saw the continuation of this occurrence, as evidenced by the instances of Çayönü and Gusir Höyük. The early sedentary populations are the main focus of this discussion since they produced a number of artifacts and a comparatively more sophisticated building that have no known predecessors in the area. Even while layers in Körtik Tepe, Boncuklu Tarla, and Çemka Höyük reach the Epipaleolithic, this period cannot yet be thoroughly discussed as a distinct historical period.

Çemka Höyük and Boncuklu Tarla are the southern sites in this group. At Boncuklu Tarla, there are layers referred to as Epipaleolithic, though detailed publications of these periods are still pending. Nonetheless, certain layers date back to the PPNA and change to the PPNB. In the PPNA layer, two silos with a diameter of 1.5–2 meters and a circular structure with a diameter of 5 meters were discovered. The building has a relatively shallow floor level and sturdy walls, resembling those seen in the higher levels of Gusir Höyük. This stratum comes from the early to middle of the 11th millennium BC. An 8–10 × 2.5 m public building with curved corners is located in the transition layer. Its flooring is made of a mixture of clay, marl, earth, and ash.

Although Çemka Höyük has not yet been explored, walls from two-meter-tall structures were discovered in the areas where the perimeter of the damage caused by the road construction was cleaned. These underground homes have walls made of medium-sized stones. For this site, the Late Epipaleolithic period is also significant, yet no published dating has been done to determine the exact period of occupation. Gusir Höyük was also explored for a short time, much like other rescue excavations. Although there are significant discrepancies, the radiocarbon dates and early reports on chipped stone demonstrate a coherent picture with the contemporaries. The location is close to the striking Gusir Lake, which is also featured in the excavation plan.

The site of Hayonim in Israel yields the earliest evidence of the creation of lime-based mortars, dating back to the 11th millennium BC. Subsequent evidence from other Near and Middle Eastern sites dates to the 8th or 7th millennium BC. The main purpose of mortars in these situations was to revet walls and floors.

== Environmental changes ==
The light brown pumice found at the Mesolithic site of Staosnaig on Colonsay can be geochemically associated to the pumice deposits found on the southern flanks of Katla. Although the eruption that created this pumice cannot be precisely dated, it most likely took place between the late 8th and early 11th millennium BC. The brown pumice discovered at the Mesolithic site of Staosnaig and the Vikurhóll pumice discovered on the southern flanks of Katla can both be geochemically associated to the pumice. This and the ancient pumice share a lot of geochemical similarities with the Vedde Ash, which was deposited in Northwestern Europe during the 11th millennium BC. It's unclear at this time if Katla experienced multiple geochemically related eruptions or just one. While copper objects have been used in Asia Minor since the 11th millennium BC, they were only widely used in the 6th and 5th millennium BC (c. 8 ka to c. 7 ka or 7950 BP to 6950 BP) in the Balkan Peninsula and the Carpathian Basin.

== Bibliography ==
=== Webpages ===
- Ibáñez-Estévez, Juan José; Anderson, Patricia C.; Arranz, Amaia; Urquijo, González; E., Jesús; Jörgensen-Lindahl, Anne; Mazzucco, Niccolò; Pichon, Fiona; Richter, Tobias (8 January 2021). "The Evolution of Plant Harvesting at The Dawn of Agriculture: Perspectives from Sickle Gloss Texture Analyses". Research Square. hdl:10261/226283.
- "Neolithic and Eneolithic copper artifacts in the area of the Lower Mureş and Crişul Alb Valleys". Revista Transilvania. 3 December 2015.

=== Books ===
- Areti, Chalkioti (6 November 2018). Reconstructing the coastal configuration of Lemnos Island (Northeast Aegean Sea, Greece). CNRS Alpha. CNRS Éditions. pp. 109–118. ISBN 978-2-271-13045-7.
- Panagiotopoulou, Eleni (2018). Reconstructing diet, tracing mobility: Ιsotopic approach to social change during the transition from the Bronze to the Early Iron Age in Thessaly, Greece. University of Groningen. ISBN 978-94-034-0935-1.
- Radivojević, Miljana; Roberts, Benjamin; Marić, Miroslav; Kuzmanović-Cvetković, Julka; Rehren, Thilo, eds. (2021). The Rise of Metallurgy in Eurasia: Evolution, Organisation and Consumption of Early Metal in the Balkans. Archaeopress Archaeology. doi:10.32028/9781803270425. ISBN 978-1-80327-042-5. S2CID 245057541.

=== Journals ===
- Al-Araimi, Nasser Ali; Al-Atiyat, Raed Mahmoud; Gaafar, Osman Mahgoub; Vasconcelos, Raquel; Luzuriaga-Neira, Agusto; Eisa, Mohamed Osman; Amir, Nadir; Benaissa, Mohammed Hocine; Alfaris, Abdulbari Abbas; Aljumaah, Riyadh Saleh; Elnakhla, Sayed M.; Salem, Mohamed M.I.; Ishag, Ibrahim A.; El Khasmi, Mohammed; Beja-Pereira, Albano (2017). "Maternal genetic diversity and phylogeography of native Arabian goats". Livestock Science. 206. Elsevier BV: 88–94. doi:10.1016/j.livsci.2017.09.017. ISSN 1871-1413.
- Avner, Uzi (2006). ""Of Wood and Stone": The Significance of Israelite Cultic Items in the Bible and Its Early Interpreters. By Elizabeth C. LaRocca-Pitts. Harvard Semitic Monographs, no. 61. Winona Lake, Indiana: Eisenbrauns, 2001. Pp. xiii + 385. $39.95". Journal of Near Eastern Studies. 65 (1). University of Chicago Press: 51–55. doi:10.1086/504904. ISSN 0022-2968.
- Baudouin, Emmanuel (1 June 2019). "Rethinking architectural techniques of the Southern Caucasus in the 6th millennium BC: A re-examination of former data and new insights" (PDF). Paléorient (45–1). OpenEdition: 115–150. doi:10.4000/paleorient.602. ISSN 0153-9345.
- Baysal, Emma L.; Erek, Cevdet Merih (4 November 2018). "Material Movement in the Near Eastern Epipalaeolithic: Implications of the Shell and Stone Beads of Direkli Cave, Turkey". Journal of Field Archaeology. 43 (8). Informa UK Limited: 591–603. doi:10.1080/00934690.2018.1529506. ISSN 0093-4690. S2CID 135062183.
- Benz, Marion; Deckers, Katleen; Rössner, Corinna; Alexandrovskiy, Alexander; Pustovoytov, Konstantin; Scheeres, Mirjam; Fecher, Marc; Coşkun, Aytaç; Riehl, Simone; Alt, Kurt W.; Özkaya, Vecihi (2015). "Prelude to village life. Environmental data and building traditions of the Epipalaeolithic settlement at Körtik Tepe, Southeastern Turkey". Paléorient (in French). 41 (2). PERSEE Program: 9–30. doi:10.3406/paleo.2015.5673. ISSN 0153-9345.
- Carter, Tristan; Grant, Sarah; Kartal, Metin; Coşkun, Aytaç; Özkaya, Vecihi (2013). "Networks and Neolithisation: sourcing obsidian from Körtik Tepe (SE Anatolia)". Journal of Archaeological Science. 40 (1). Elsevier BV: 556–569. Bibcode:2013JArSc..40..556C. doi:10.1016/j.jas.2012.08.003. ISSN 0305-4403.
- Carter, Tristan; Mihailović, Danica D.; Papadatos, Yiannis; Sofianou, Chrysa (30 December 2016). "The Cretan Mesolithic in context: new data from Livari Skiadi (SE Crete)". Documenta Praehistorica. 43. University of Ljubljana: 87–102. doi:10.4312/dp.43.3. ISSN 1854-2492.
- Çilingiroğlu, Çiler; Kaczanowska, Malgorzata; Kozłowski, Janusz K.; Dinçer, Berkay; Çakırlar, Canan; Turan, Didem (2 August 2020). "Between Anatolia and the Aegean: Epipalaeolithic and Mesolithic Foragers of the Karaburun Peninsula" (PDF). Journal of Field Archaeology. 45 (7). Informa UK Limited: 479–497. doi:10.1080/00934690.2020.1786929. ISSN 0093-4690. S2CID 221666451.
- Dilaria, Simone; Secco, Michele (2022). "Mortar Recipes Through the Ages. A Brief Review of Data from Prehistory to Late Antiquity". Arheologija i Prirodne Nauke. 18. Faculty of Philology, University of Belgrade: 113–126. doi:10.18485/arhe_apn.2022.18.9. ISSN 1452-7448. S2CID 257212706.
- Emra, Stephanie; Benz, Marion; Siddiq, Abu B; Özkaya, Vecihi (4 February 2022). "Adaptions in subsistence strategy to environment changes across the Younger Dryas - Early Holocene boundary at Körtiktepe, Southeastern Turkey". The Holocene. 32 (5). SAGE Publications: 390–413. Bibcode:2022Holoc..32..390E. doi:10.1177/09596836221074030. ISSN 0959-6836. S2CID 246593812.
- Endoltseva, Ekaterina (2017). "A motive of the Bull's Head as a Decoration of the Medieval Churches in Southern Caucasus". Anastasis Research in Medieval Culture and Art. IV (1). Editura ARTES: 128–142. ISSN 2392-862X.
- Forenbaher, Stašo; Miracle, Preston T. (31 December 2006). "The spread of farming in the Eastern Adriatic". Documenta Praehistorica. 33. University of Ljubljana: 89–100. doi:10.4312/dp.33.10. ISSN 1854-2492.
- Hodder, Ian (2011). "The Role of Religion in the Neolithic of the Middle East and Anatolia with Particular Reference to Çatalhöyük". Paléorient (in French). 37 (1). PERSEE Program: 111–122. doi:10.3406/paleo.2011.5442. ISSN 0153-9345.
- Ibáñez-Estévez, Juan J.; Anderson, Patricia C.; Arranz-Otaegui, Amaia; González-Urquijo, Jesús E.; Jörgensen-Lindahl, Anne; Mazzucco, Niccolò; Pichon, Fiona; Richter, Tobias (2021). "Sickle gloss texture analysis elucidates long-term change in plant harvesting during the transition to agriculture". Journal of Archaeological Science. 136 105502. Elsevier BV. Bibcode:2021JArSc.136j5502I. doi:10.1016/j.jas.2021.105502. ISSN 0305-4403. S2CID 240037984.
- Jagusiak, Krzysztof; Kokoszko, Maciej (15 June 2016). "Barley flour (áleuron kríthinon) in ancient and early Byzantine medicine (I – VII c. AD)". Symbolae Philologorum Posnaniensium Graecae et Latinae. 27 (1). Adam Mickiewicz University Poznan: 41. doi:10.14746/sppgl.2017.xxvii.1.3. ISSN 0302-7384.
- Karul, Necmi (1 December 2020). "The Beginning of the Neolithic in Southeast Anatolia". Documenta Praehistorica. 47. University of Ljubljana: 76–95. doi:10.4312/dp.47.5. ISSN 1854-2492. S2CID 229384491.
- Lancelotti, Carla; Madella, Marco (2012). "The 'invisible' product: developing markers for identifying dung in archaeological contexts". Journal of Archaeological Science. 39 (4). Elsevier BV: 953–963. Bibcode:2012JArSc..39..953L. doi:10.1016/j.jas.2011.11.007. ISSN 0305-4403.
- Malone, Caroline (2017). "Clare Manen / Thomas Perrin / Jean Guilaine (eds), La transition néolithique en Mediterranee". Germania: Anzeiger der Römisch-Germanischen Kommission des Deutschen Archäologischen Instituts: Bd. 94 (2016). doi:10.11588/GER.2016.39080.
- Nachasova, I. E.; Burakov, K. S.; Pilipenko, O. V. (2015). "Variations in the intensity of the geomagnetic field in Siberia during the last 13000 years". Izvestiya, Physics of the Solid Earth. 51 (1). Pleiades Publishing Ltd: 44–50. Bibcode:2015IzPSE..51...44N. doi:10.1134/s1069351314050073. ISSN 1069-3513. S2CID 129117334.
- Pearson, Kazue (1978). "Some problems in the study of Jomon subsistence". Antiquity. 52 (204). Cambridge University Press (CUP): 21–27. doi:10.1017/s0003598x00051164. ISSN 0003-598X. S2CID 161532902.
- Radivojević, Miljana; Roberts, Benjamin W. (2021). "Early Balkan Metallurgy: Origins, Evolution and Society, 6200–3700 BC". Journal of World Prehistory. 34 (2). Springer Science and Business Media LLC: 195–278. doi:10.1007/s10963-021-09155-7. ISSN 0892-7537. S2CID 237005605.
- Rostam, Dilan (24 April 2017). "Evolved Sustainable Building Engineering in Vernacular Architecture of Kurdistan". ARO-The Scientific Journal of Koya University. 5 (1). Koya University: 9–19. doi:10.14500/aro.10148. ISSN 2410-9355.
- Siddiq, Abu B.; Şahin, Feridun S.; Özkaya, Vecihi (1 June 2021). "Local trend of symbolism at the dawn of the Neolithic: The painted bone plaquettes from PPNA Körtiktepe, Southeast Turkey". Archaeological Research in Asia. 26 100280. doi:10.1016/j.ara.2021.100280.
- Triantaphyllou, Maria V.; Firkasis, Nikolaos; Tsourou, Theodora; Vassilakis, Emmanuel; Spyrou, Evangelos; Koukousioura, Olga; Oikonomou, Argyro; Skentos, Athanasios (12 May 2023). ""Geo-Archaeo-Routes" on the Island of Lemnos: The "Nalture" Experience as a Holistic Geotouristic Approach within the Geoethical Perspective". Geosciences. 13 (5). MDPI AG: 143. Bibcode:2023Geosc..13..143T. doi:10.3390/geosciences13050143. ISSN 2076-3263.
- Wickham-Jones, Caroline; Hardy, Karen (2004). "Camas Daraich". Scottish Archaeological Internet Reports. 12 (12). Society of Antiquaries of Scotland: 1–79. doi:10.9750/issn.2056-7421.2004.12.1-79. ISSN 2056-7421. S2CID 246925921.
- Wiśniewski, Tadeusz; Mroczek, Przemysław; Rodzik, Jan; Zagórski, Piotr; Wilczyński, Jarosław; Fišáková, Miriam Nývltová (2012). "On the periphery of the Magdalenian World: An open-air site in Klementowice (Lublin Upland, Eastern Poland)". Quaternary International. 272–273. Elsevier BV: 308–321. Bibcode:2012QuInt.272..308W. doi:10.1016/j.quaint.2012.06.032. ISSN 1040-6182.

=== Conference Reports ===
- Clemente Conte, Ignacio; Ibáñez Estévez, Juan José; Gibaja Bao, Juan Francisco; Mazzucco, Niccolò; Terradas, Xavier; Mozota Holgueras, Millan; Borrell, Ferran (2018). "Cereal Use-wear Traces and Harvesting Methods". Subsistence Strategies in the Stone Age, Direct and Indirect Evidence of Fishing and Gathering. Institute for the History of Material Culture Russian Academy of Science. pp. 192–194. doi:10.31600/978-5-907053-00-7-2018-192-194. ISBN 978-5-907053-00-7.
