= 13th millennium BC =

Millennium between 13,000 BC and 12,001 BC

The 13th millennium BC spanned the years 13,000 BC to 12,001 BC (c. 15 ka to c. 14 ka). This millennium is during the Upper Paleolithic period. It is impossible to precisely date events that happened during this millennium, and all dates associated with this millennium are estimates mostly based on geological analysis, anthropological analysis, and radiometric dating.

== Geology ==
=== Animals ===
In France, the first incisor from a red deer is dated to the 13–12th millennium BC. In Levantine Natufian sites, dogs occur as early as this millennium.

=== Environmental changes ===
More than a century ago, it first became clear how much of the Magdalenian and Azilian underwent change in Western Europe. Since that time, these mutations succeeding one another between the 14th and 12th millennium BC, particularly during the Lateglacial warming, were often seen as a real revolution, frequently described through the filter of myths of catastrophes which then inspired and at times still influences prehistoric research.

== Human culture ==
=== Humans ===
It is known that obsidian mining in Asia Minor was well underway by this millennium. Obsidian was a resource that hunter-gatherers may have traded during this millennium.

=== Technology and agriculture ===
The frequency of occurrence of fundamental tool groups such as end-scrapers, burins, truncated pieces, backed pieces, perforators, and combination tools in Moravian inventory is most closely matched and is dated to the late 13th – early 11th millennium BC. From the 17th to the 9th millennium BC, no surface pressure flaking technology is known to have existed in Europe. Computer simulations demonstrate that "proto" agriculture might have started far earlier than the Fertile Crescent's conventional "beginning" of agriculture, which is supposed to have occurred around the time of the 13th millennium BC's last glacial maximum (LGM) or the beginning of the 9th millennium BC. This "proto-agriculture" phases may have begun (perhaps separately) across Eurasia and Africa at various locations.

=== Other cultural developments ===
Jebel Sahaba, a prehistoric battle site, dates to the 17–12th millennium BC. Round corrals have been discovered in archaeological settings dating back to this millennium. Boncuklu and Pınarbaşı sites stretch back to this millennium.

== Bibliography ==
=== Books ===
- Desrosiers, Pierre M. (13 March 2012). The Emergence of Pressure Blade Making: from Origin to Modern Experimentation. Springer New York. p. 269. ISBN 9781461420033.

=== Journals ===
- Binois, Annelise; Bridault, Anne; Pion, Gilbert; Ducrocq, Thierry (March 2014). "Dental Development Pathology in Wild artiodactyls: Two Prehistoric Case Studies from France" (PDF). International Journal of Paleopathology. 4 (1): 53–58. Bibcode:2014IJPal...4...53B. doi:10.1016/j.ijpp.2013.11.002. PMID 29539502.
- Valentin, Boris (2008). "Magdalenian and Azilian Lithic Productions in the Paris Basin: Disappearance of a Programmed Economy". The Arkotek Journal. 2 (1).
- Hole, Frank; Wyllie, Cherra (2007). "The Oldest Depictions of Canines and a Possible Early Breed of Dog in Iran". Paléorient. 33 (1): 175. doi:10.3406/paleo.2007.5213.
- Crevecoeur, Isabelle; Dias-Meirinho, Marie-Hélène; Zazzo, Antoine; Antoine, Daniel; Bon, François (2021). "New insights on interpersonal violence in the Late Pleistocene based on the Nile valley cemetery of Jebel Sahaba". Scientific Reports. 11 (1): 9991. Bibcode:2021NatSR..11.9991C. doi:10.1038/s41598-021-89386-y. ISSN 2045-2322. PMC 8159958. PMID 34045477.
- Hodder, Ian (2011). "The Role of Religion in the Neolithic of the Middle East and Anatolia with Particular Reference to Çatalhöyük" (PDF). Paléorient. 37 (1): 117. doi:10.3406/paleo.2011.5442.
- Redding, Richard (2011). "The OK Corral: Standing Wall Island Mystery, Solved" (PDF). Aeragram: Ancient Egypt Research Associates. 12 (1): 4. ISSN 1944-0014.
- Wiśniewski, Tomasz S; Mroczek, Przemysław; Rodzik, Jan; Zagórski, Piotr; Wilczyński, Jacek R; Fišáková, Miriam Nývltová (25 October 2012). "Erratum to "On the Periphery of the Magdalenian World: an open-air Site in Klementowice (Lublin Upland, Eastern Poland)" [Quat. Int. 272–273 (2012) 308–321]" (PDF). Quaternary International. 276–277 (1): 309. Bibcode:2012QuInt.276..300W. doi:10.1016/j.quaint.2012.08.2106.

=== Conference reports ===
- Dendrinos, Dimitrios S. (2015). From Newgrange to Stonehenge: Monuments to a Bull Cult and Origins of Innovation. Emeritus Professor, School Of Architecture and Urban Design, University of Kansas, Lawrence, Kansas, USA. In residence at Ormond Beach, Florida. Lawrence, Kansas, USA: University of Kansas. pp. 26, 27 – via ResearchGate.
