= Atalay =

Atalay is a Turkish name and surname. Notable people with the surname include:

== Given name ==
- Atalay Filiz, Turkish serial murder suspect

== Surname ==
- Beşir Atalay (born 1947), Turkish politician
- Buket Atalay (born 1990), Turkish female Paralympian goalball player
- Bülent Atalay, Turkish-American author
- Erdoğan Atalay (born 1966), Turkish-German actor
- Mahmut Atalay (1934–2004), Turkish sport wrestler
- Nejdet Atalay (born 1978), Turkish politician
- Pinar Atalay (born 1978), German radio and television presenter
