= Körtik Tepe =

Neolithic archeological site in Turkey

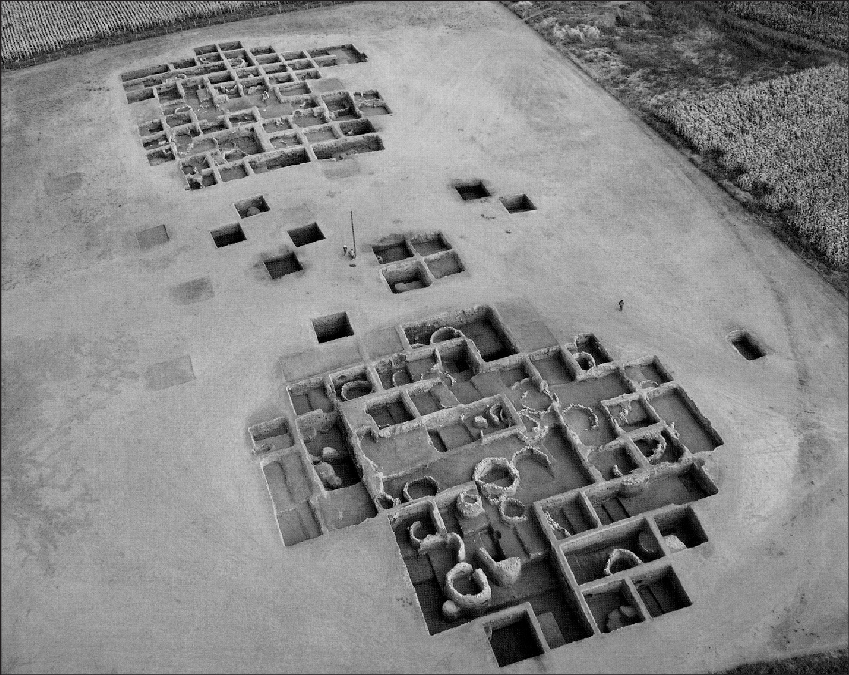
- Kortik Tepe in 2014

- Location in Turkey
- 37°48′51.90″N 40°59′02.02″E
- Type: Settlement
- Location: Diyarbakir, Turkey

History
- Built: c. 10,400 BC
- Abandoned: c. 9250 BC

Site notes
- Archaeologists: Vecihi Özkaya
- Discovered: 2000

Körtiktepe or Körtik Tepe is the oldest known Neolithic settlement in Turkey, occupied from around 10,400 BC at the end of the Epipaleolithic, throughout much of the Younger Dryas, and during the early Pre-Pottery Neolithic A, to around 9250 BC, when it was abandoned. Together with Tell Abu Hureyra and Mureybet in Raqqa, Syria, Körtik Tepe is one of the only three securely dated sedentary sites in Upper Mesopotamia during the droughts and cold period of the Younger Dryas, and one of the earliest known settled sites by hunter-gatherers, complete with trade, art, food production, religious ritual, and social complexity.

The site was fully excavated from 2000 to 2018, in the context of salvage operations before flooding by the Ilısu Dam. The ruins were backfilled before the flooding, but the analysis of recovered items continues to this day.

== Settlement ==
The habitation of the site began in the first half of the 11th millennium BC, around 10,687 BC, and occupation became permanent with consistent density from at least 10,400 BC. Permanent occupation was ascertained throughout much of the Younger Dryas, and during the early Pre-Pottery Neolithic A. The rich ecological environment around Kortik Tepe, with abundant year-round resources, especially mammals, plants, and fish, probably explains the attractiveness of staying in the same place, with sedentary permanent habitation. The inhabitants were exceptionally tall (1.72 meters for males, 1.63 meters for female on average), and healthy. No traces of violence were observed at the site.

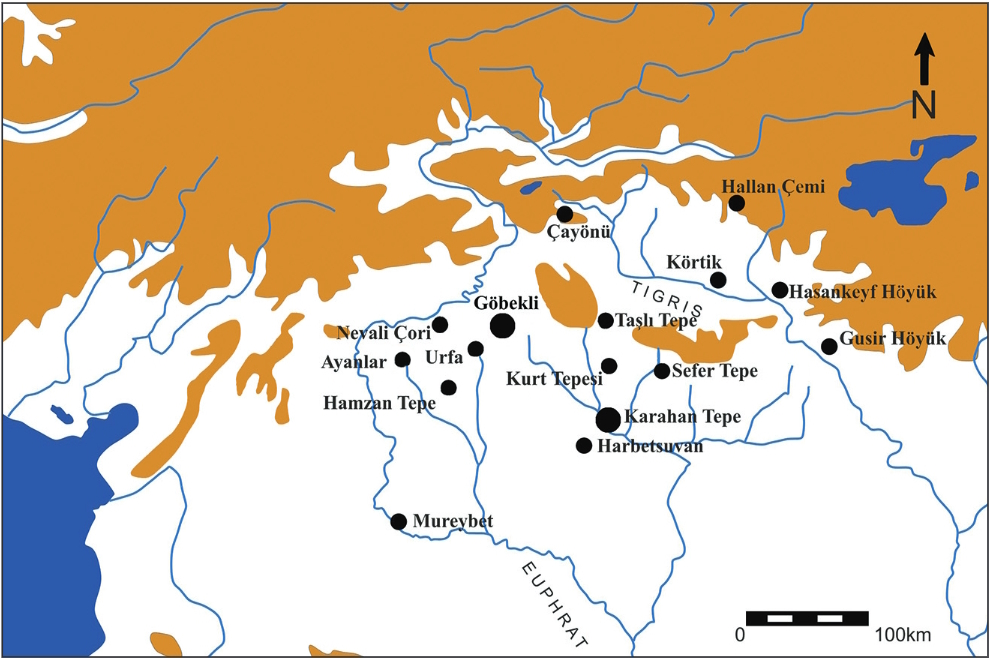
Main Upper Mesopotamian Pre-Pottery Neolithic sites, with Körtik Tepe

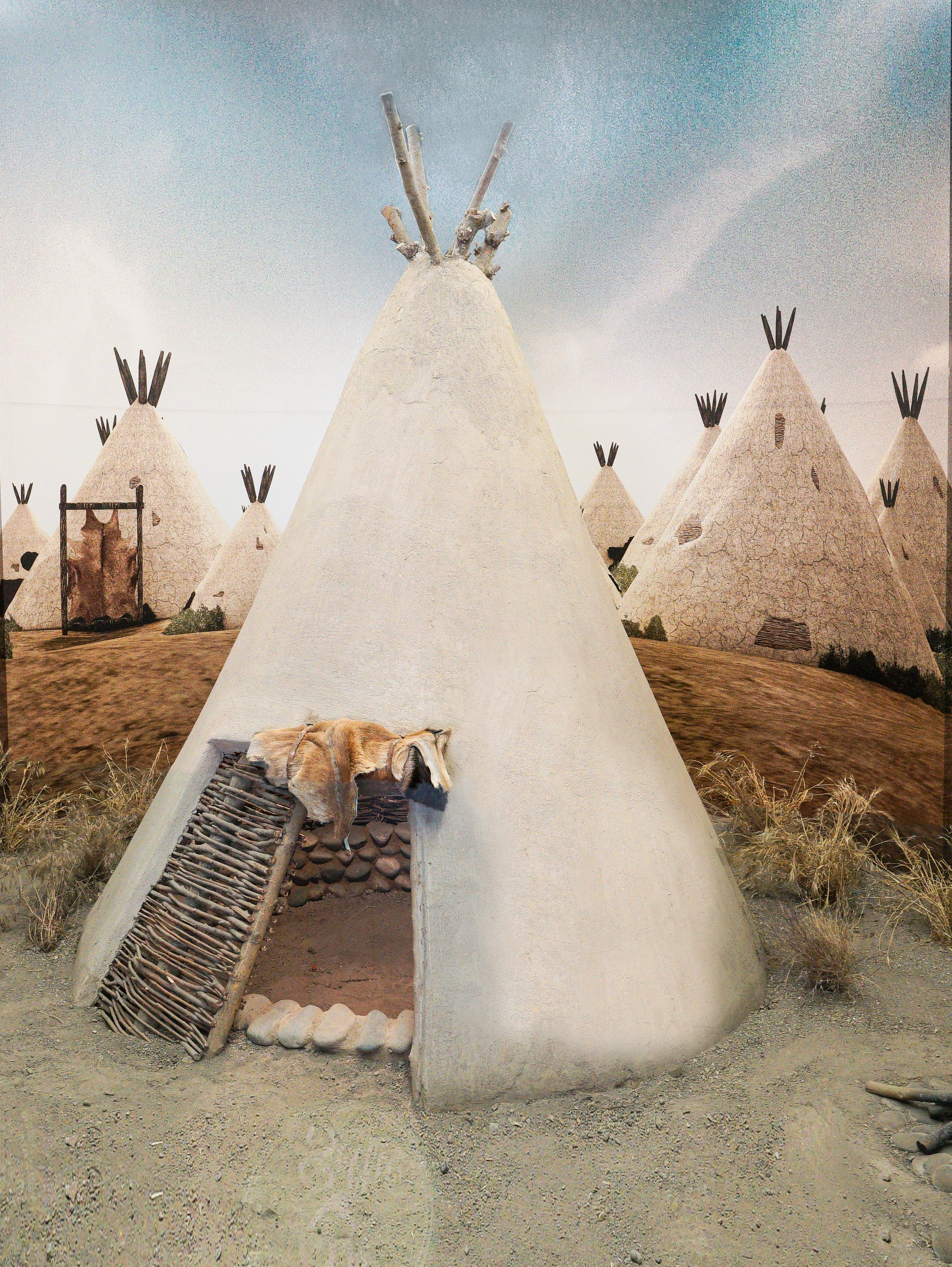
Tent-like sedentary Neolithic dwelling in hard material, Körtik Tepe, 10,400-9250 BCE, Diyarbakır Archaeology Museum.

Within the context of Pre-Pottery Neolithic sites across the Middle East and Anatolia, Kortik Tepe is the most populated site yet known, with over 2,000 single and double burials, and 460 architectural remains. Burials often involved defleshing and coloring the skeleton of the deceased with black and red paint. Numerous ritual items have also been found, whose designs have been influential throughout Upper Mesopotamia.

Several circular buildings were found at the site, constructed with relatively thin stone walls, from at least 10,400 BC and until the abandonment of the site. It is thought by the discoverers that these formed a circular stone basis, on top of which a tent-like structure was erected for the roofing, made of poles supporting a lattice, with a covering of plaster and mud. The construction in group evokes permanent rather than temporary settlement. Several tombs were also found under the floors, with some differentiation in the quality and quantity of graves goods, suggesting social stratification. Occupation continued and thrived during the Early Holocene. The architectural tradition of constructing round plans established around 10,400 BC and continued without any fundamental alterations until the eventual desertion of the site.

== Characteristics ==
The people of Körtik Tepe were entirely hunter-gatherers, without agriculture, but, contrary to their predecessors had a highly intensive manufacturing activity. Hundreds of thousands of flint and obsidian tools were discovered at the site, as well as 500 stone vessels, many of them decorated with incised designs of plants, animals and symbol. Thousands of stone and shell beads were also discovered, around 2,000 bone tools, as well as hundreds of ground stone tools and scepters, and hundreds of decorated bone and stone plaques.

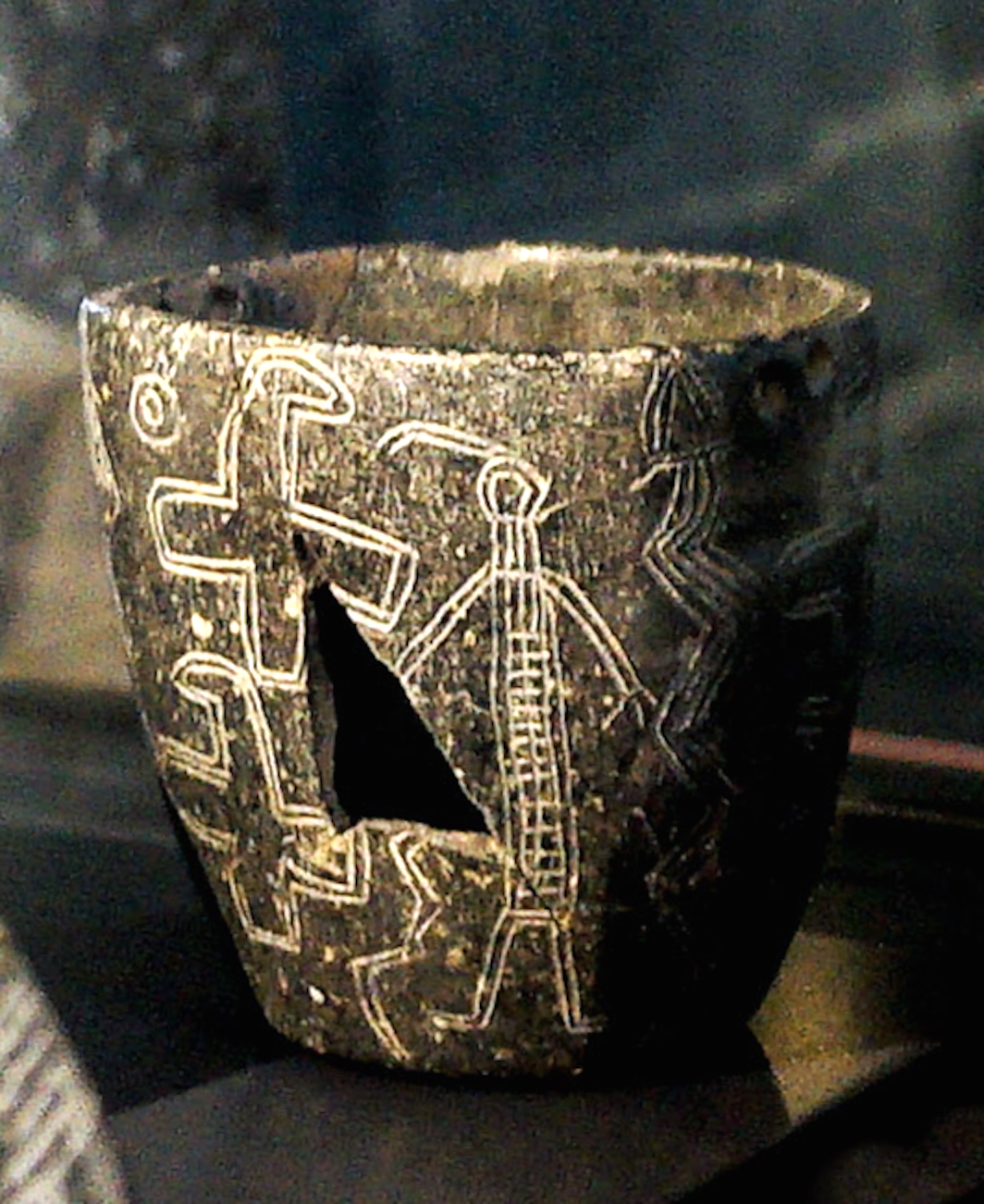
Stone vessel with symbols and clothed human figure (a unique instance in PPN sites). Körtik Tepe, around 9800 BC, Diyarbakır Archaeology Museum.

Strontium and oxygen isotope analyses of human tooth enamel indicate that the inhabitants of the Younger Dryas occupations at Kortik Tepe were born and grew up in or near the site, which is another indicator of sedentism. Although a potential minor flooding event transpired during the transition from the Younger Dryas to the Early Holocene, the site endured without evident abandonment, at least not for a prolonged interval. Occupation continued and thrived during the Early Holocene.

The site reached its peak in terms of occupation density around 9300 BC. Subsequently, it experienced an unexplained abandonment around 9250 BC, possibly attributed to natural disturbances such as flooding induced by the warming of the Holocene climate changes.

== Art ==
Körtik Tepe is recognized for the outstanding quality and richness of its visual arts, as seen on stone vessels and stone ritual objects, including depictions of humans, animals and various symbols, particularly undulating snakes. The production of decorative symbolic items, including decorated bone palettes, started during the Younger Dryas period, from the 11th millennium BC. The early Holocene saw the development of human, animal or hybrid imagery. Many of the motifs and symbols of Körtik Tepe in the Mesopotamian Basin, including at the subsequent Taş Tepeler culture sites such as Gobekli Tepe. Similar items only started to appear at other Pre-Pottery Neolithic sites towards the end of the occupation period of Körtik Tepe, as in Gusir Hoyuk or Hasankeyf Hoyuk.

Chronologically, Kortik Tepe is followed by the Taş Tepeler culture sites of Karahan Tepe and Göbekli Tepe, characterized by important monumental developments, and Jericho (site of Tell es-Sultan) with its wall structure around an early city.

Körtik Tepe may have been a predecessor of the PPN artistic and material culture in Upper Mesopotamia, including Göbekli Tepe and the other Taş Tepeler sites.

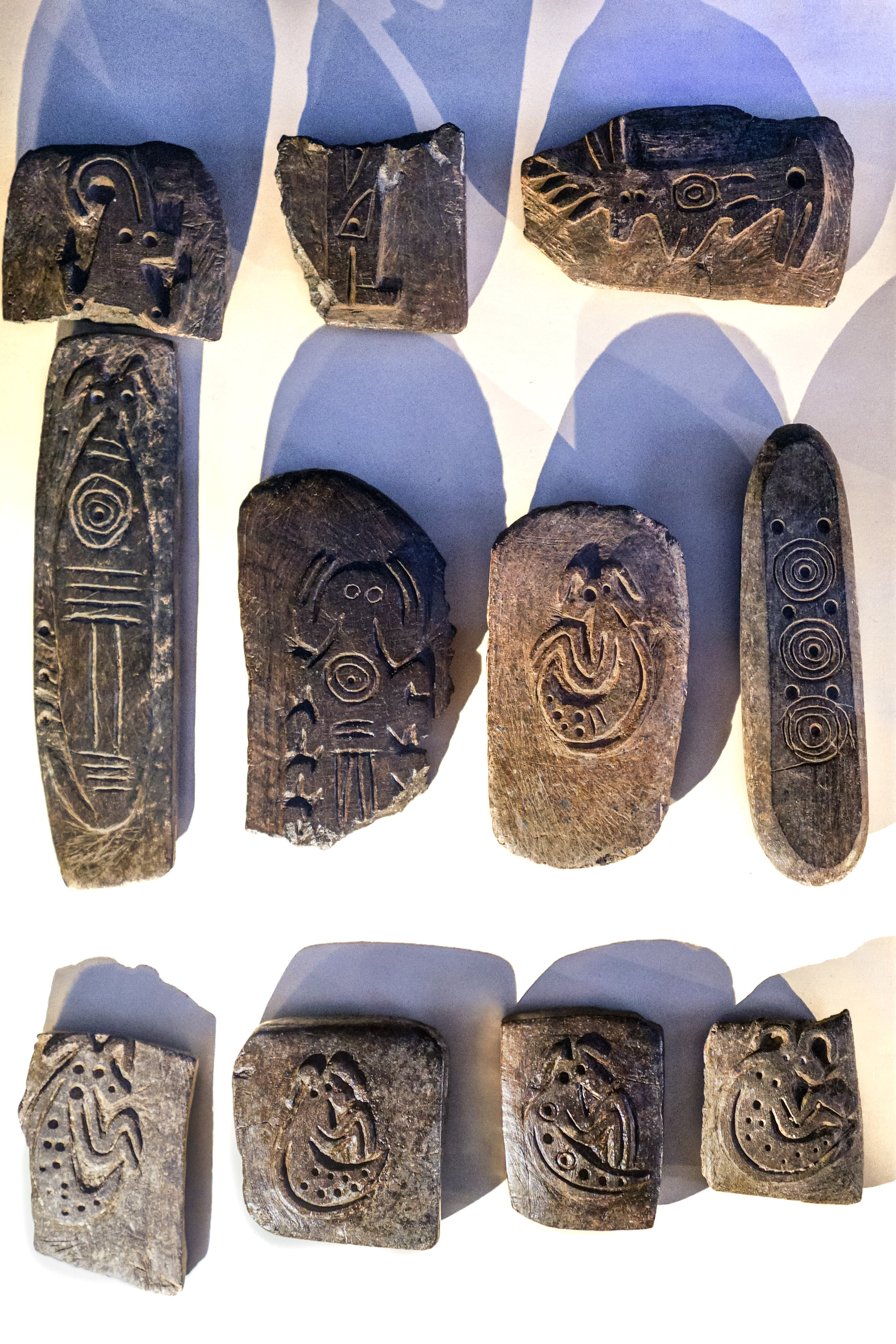
Decorated stone ritual objects, Körtik Tepe, 10,400-9250 BC, Diyarbakır Archaeology Museum

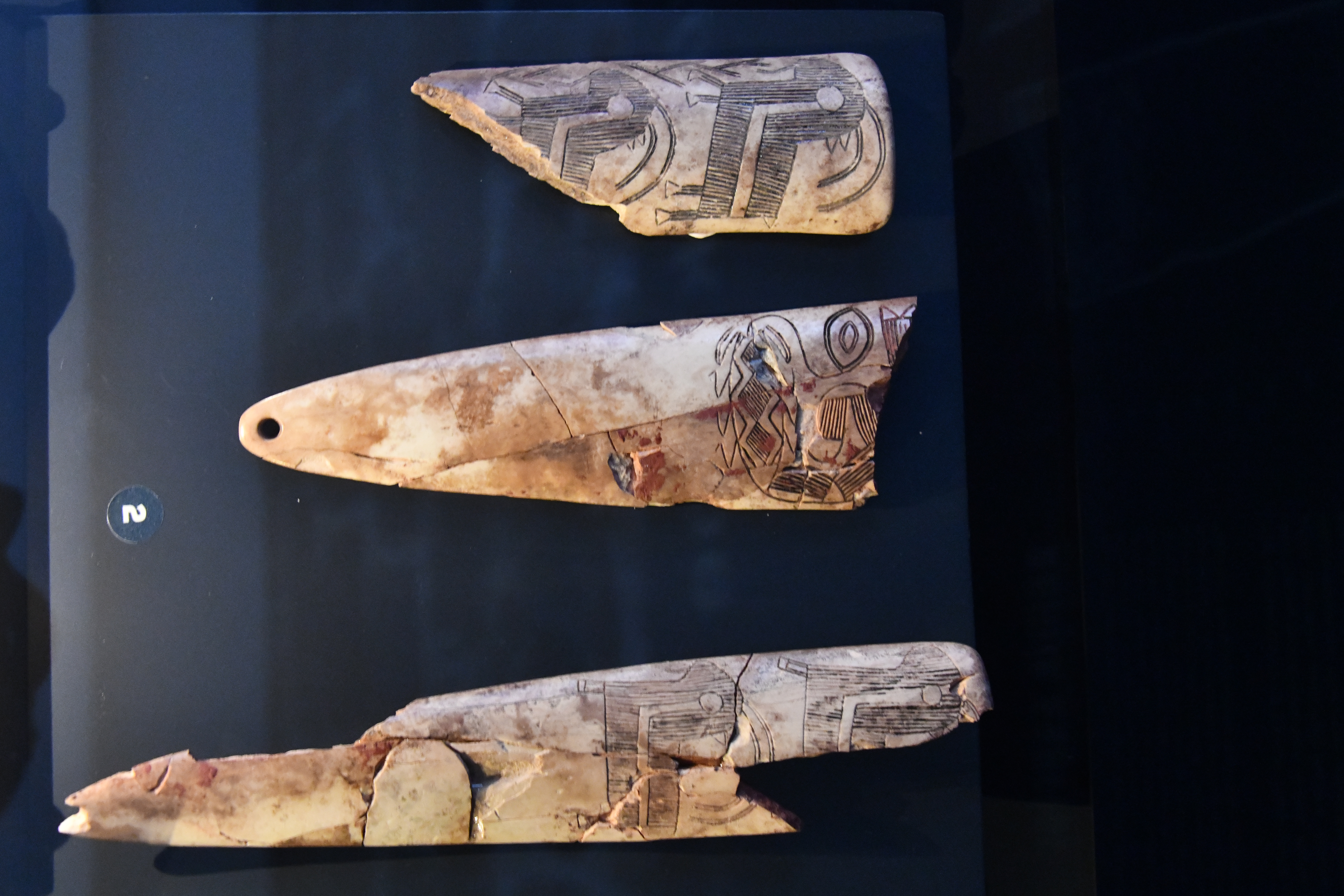
Incised bone pendant fragments

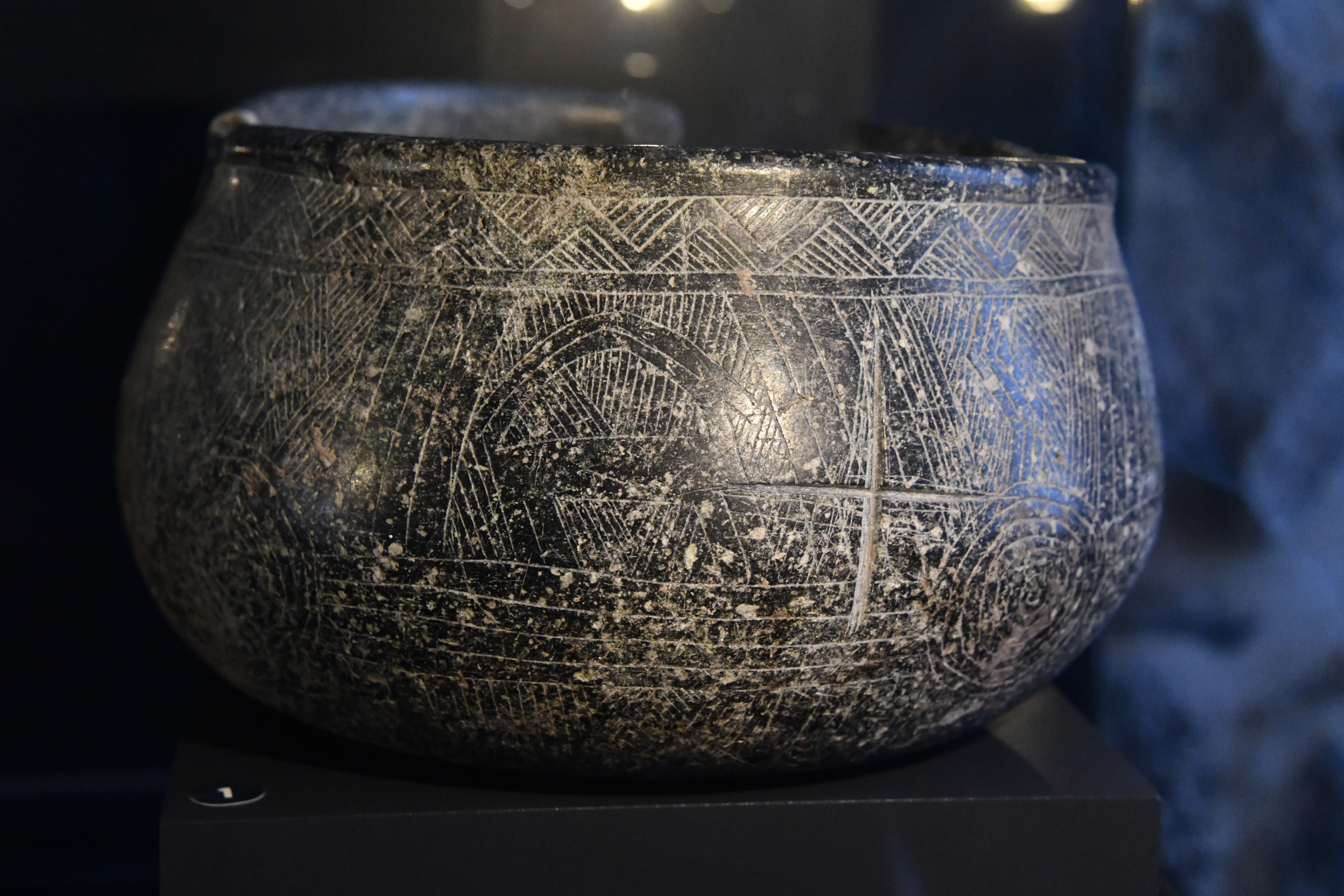
Stone vessel with gazelle motif

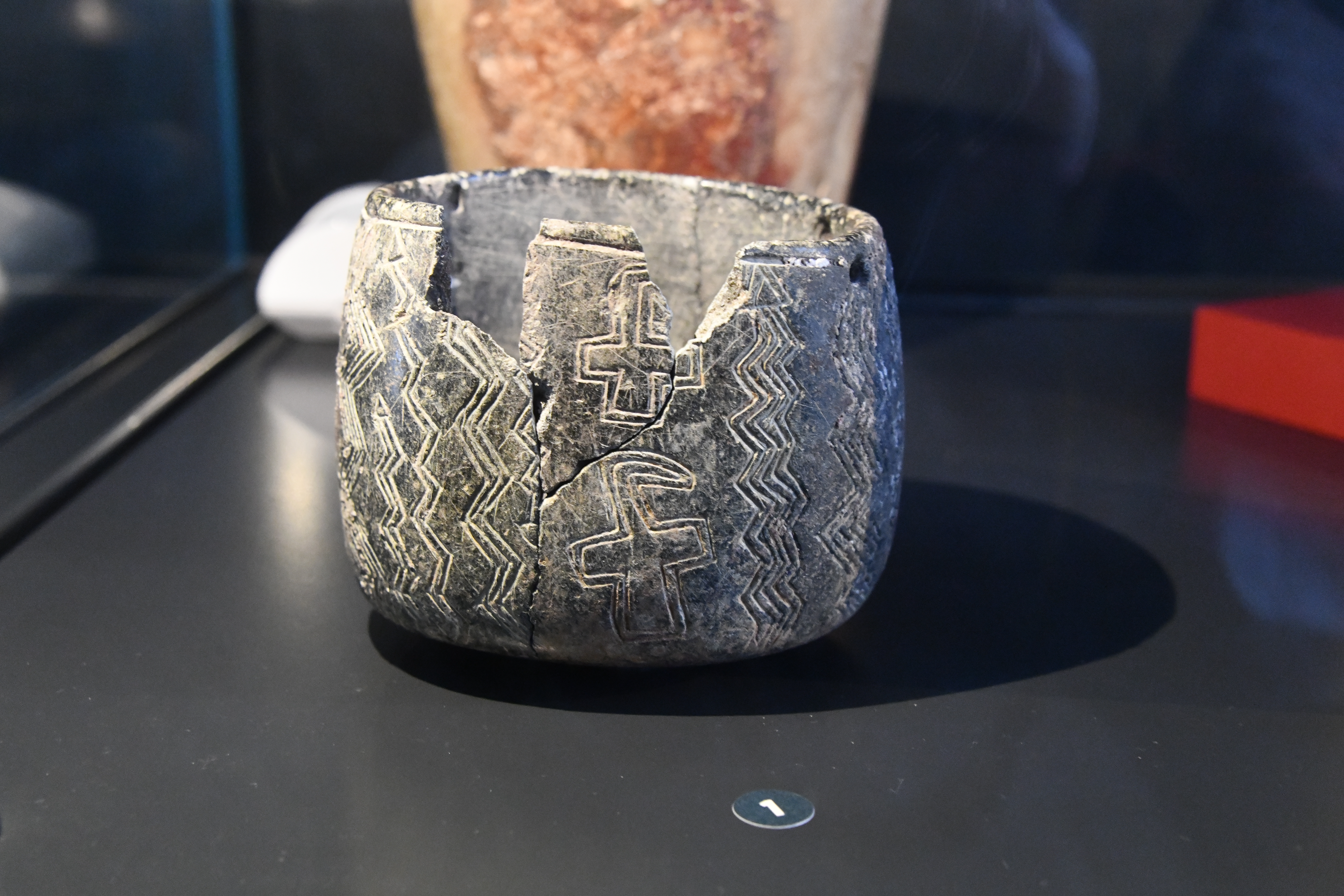
Stone vessel with undulating snake symbols

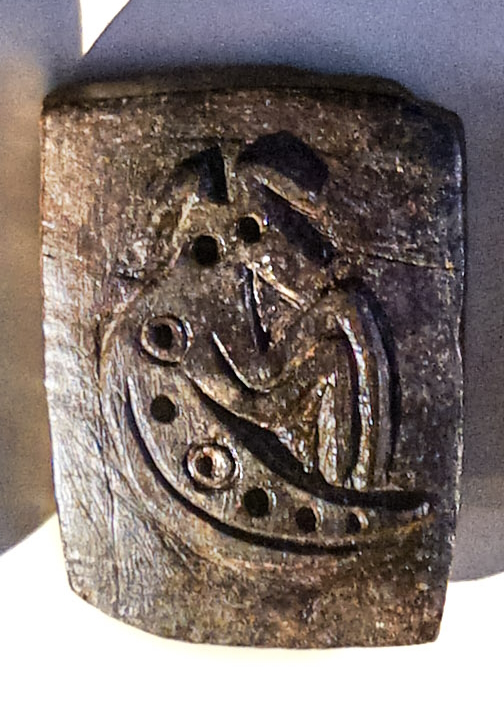
Decorated stone ritual objects with dog motif, Kortik Tepe, around 9800 BC, Diyarbakır Archaeology Museum

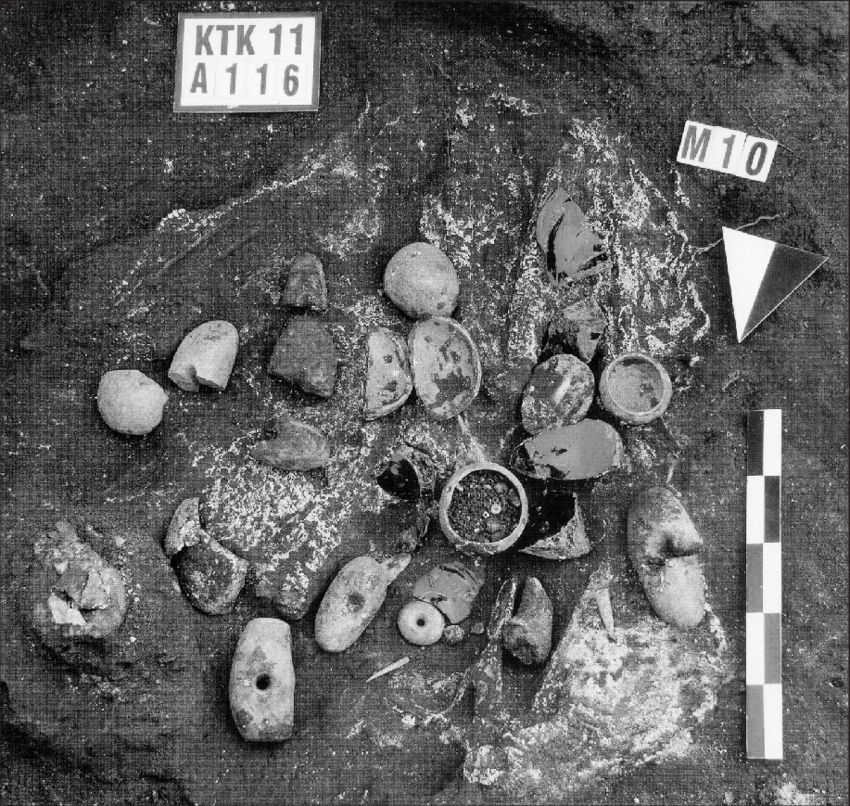
Burial gifts of a sub-floor burial from a round building of Körtik Tepe

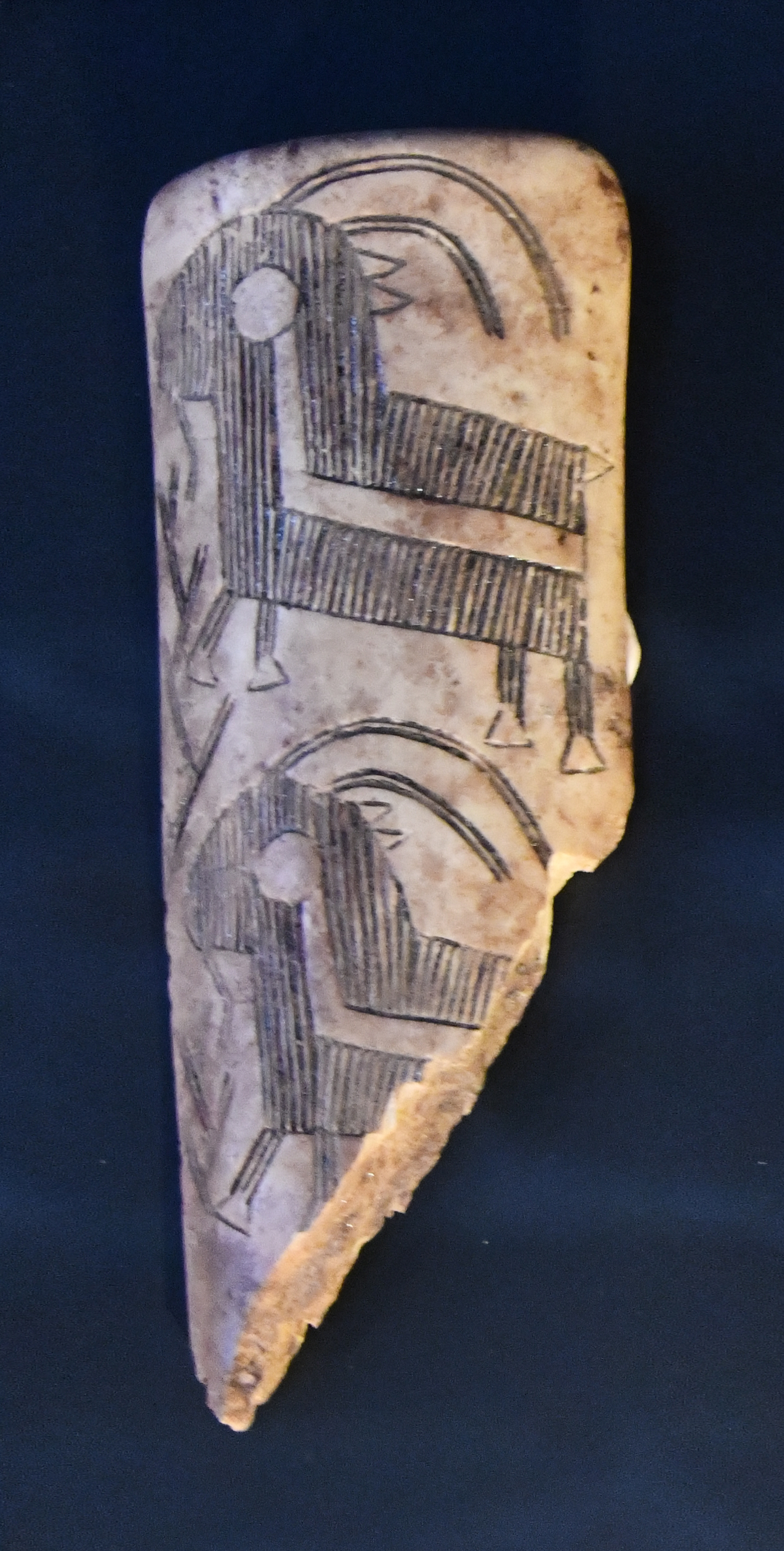
Goat Palette, KTK07, around 9350 BC, Körtik Tepe

== Bibliography ==
- Benz, M., Coşkun, A., Hajdas, I., Deckers, K., Riehl, S., Alt, K. W., Weninger, B., & Özkaya, V. (2012). Methodological implications of new radiocarbon dates from the Early Holocene site of Körtik Tepe, Southeast Anatolia. Radiocarbon, 54(3–4), 291–304. https://doi.org/10.1017/S0033822200047081
- Benz, M., Deckers, K., Rössner, C., Alexandrovskiy, A., Pustovoytov, K., Scheeres, M., Fecher, M., Coşkun, A., Riehl, S., Alt, K. W., & Özkaya, V. (2015). Prelude to village life. Environmental data and building traditions of the Epipalaeolithic settlement at Körtik Tepe, Southeastern Turkey. Paléorient, 41(2), 9–30. https://doi.org/10.3406/paleo.2015.5673
- Özkaya, Vecihi; Siddiq, Abu B. (25 October 2023). "Körtiktepe in the Origin and Development of the Neolithic in Upper Mesopotamia". The Epipalaeolithic and Neolithic in the Eastern Fertile Crescent. Routledge. pp. 138–168. doi:10.4324/9781003335504-11.
- Siddiq, A. B., Şahin, F. S., & Özkaya, V. (2021). Local trend of symbolism at the dawn of the Neolithic: The painted bone plaquettes from PPNA Körtiktepe, Southeast Turkey. Archaeological Research in Asia, 26(100280). https://doi.org/10.1016/j.ara.2021.100280

== See also ==
- Pre-Pottery Neolithic
- Pre-Pottery Neolithic A
- Prehistoric religion
- Neolithic symbolism
- Origin of Neolithic
