= Kocaman =

Kocaman is a Turkish surname. Notable people with the surname include:

- Aykut Kocaman (born 1965), Turkish footballer
- Filiz Kocaman (born 1985), Turkish volleyball player
