= 12th millennium BC =

Millennium between 12,000 BC and 11,001 BC

The 12th millennium BC spanned the years 12,000 BC to 11,001 BC (c. 14 ka to c. 13 ka). This millennium is during the Upper Paleolithic period. The Paleolithic–Mesolithic transition began in the Near East during this millennium. It is impossible to precisely date events that happened during this millennium, and all dates associated with this millennium are estimates mostly based on geological analysis, anthropological analysis, and radiometric dating.

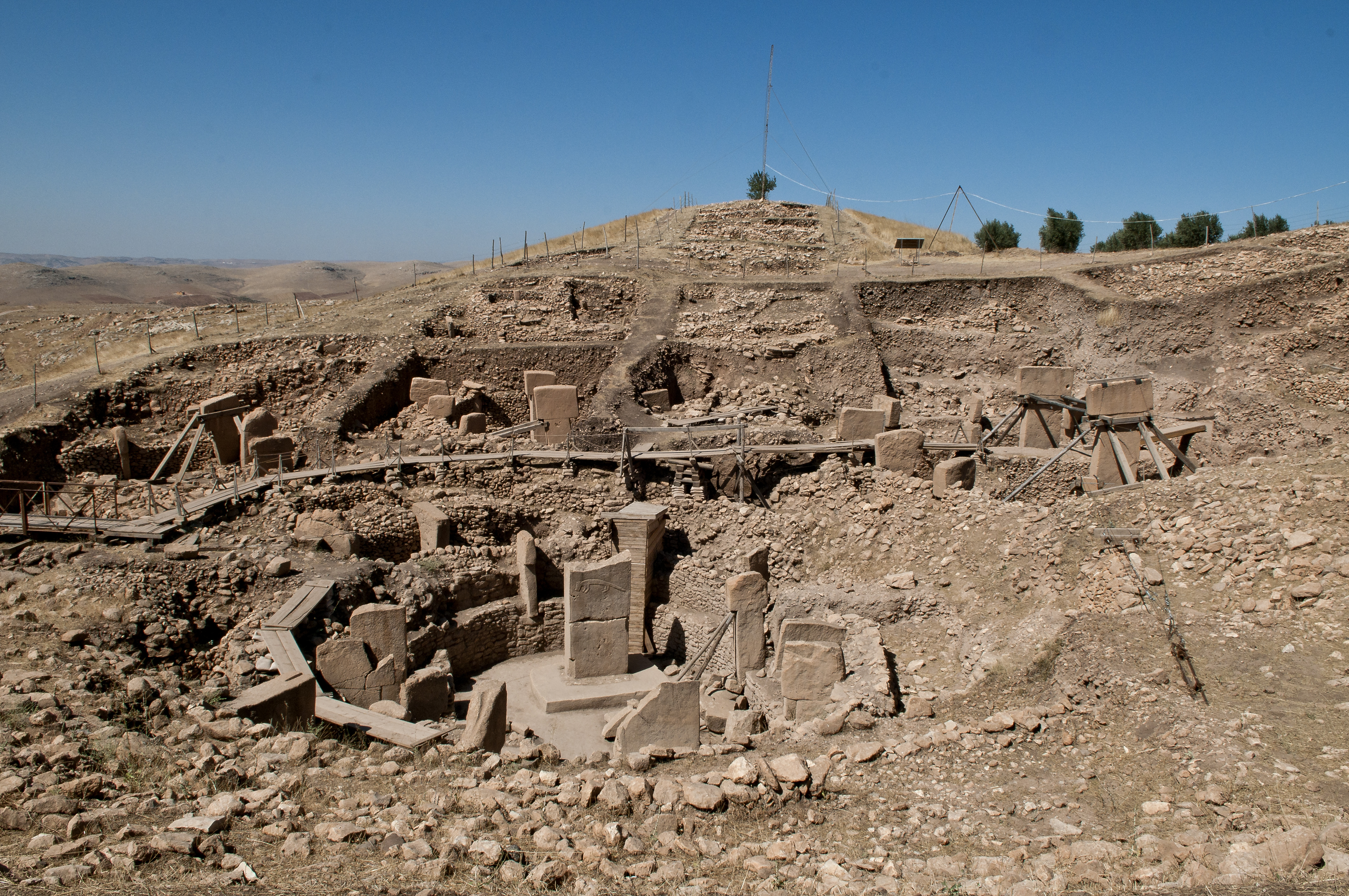
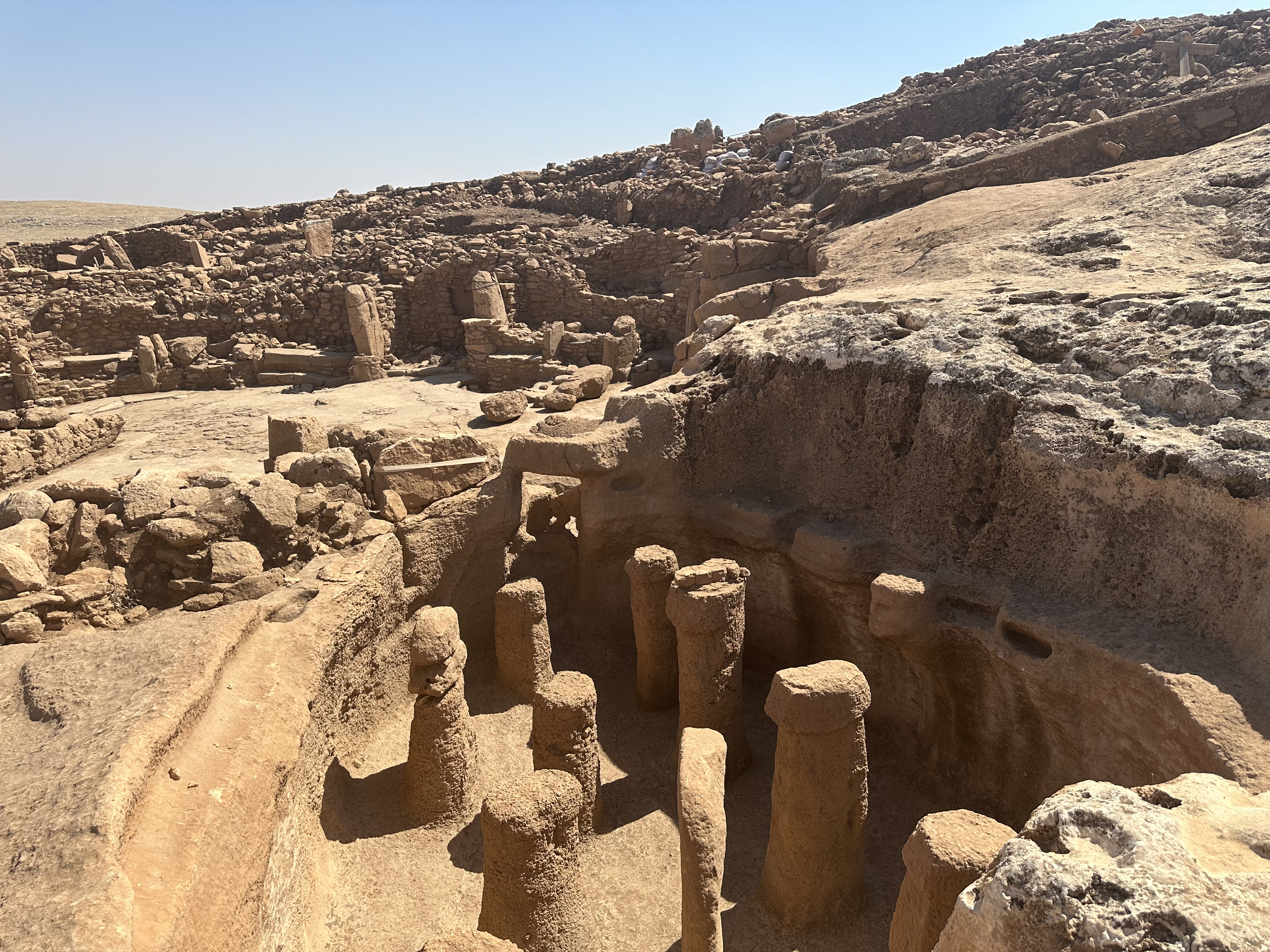
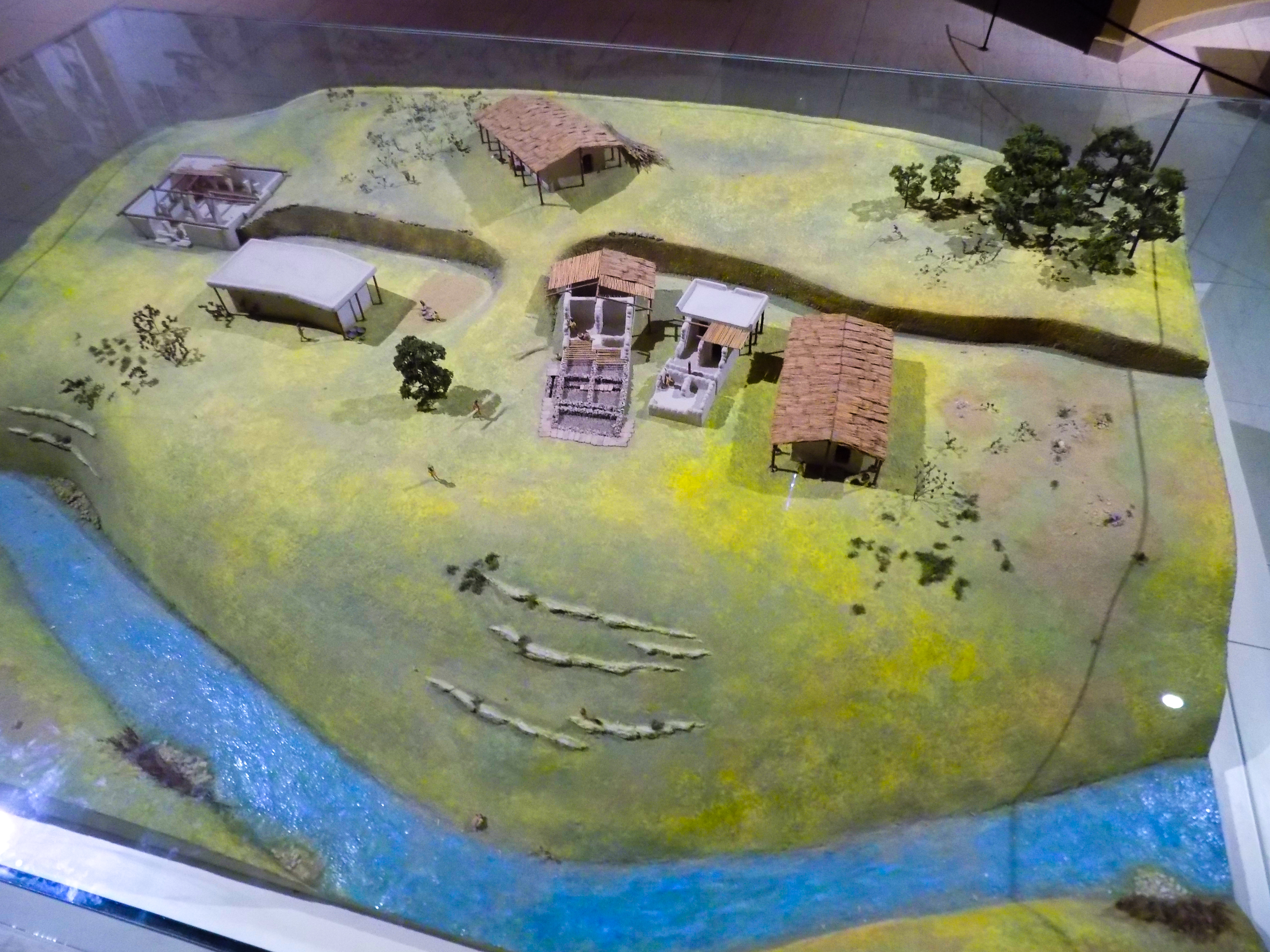
Gobekli Tepe, Karahan Tepe, and Nevali Cori were occupied in the 12th millennium BC

== Geology ==
=== Animals ===
The Horn core of Saiga tatarica is from the Komishan cave that indicates an occupation of the cave at the end of this millennium. In France, the first incisor from a red deer is dated to the 13–12th millennium BC. During this millennium, the first dog remains came from the Natufian culture of the southern Levant.

=== Environmental changes ===
There is material evidence for the build up of the Mediterranean islands that is pointing to such activity as early as the 12–11th millennium BC. More than a century ago, it first became clear how much of the Magdalenian and Azilian underwent change in Western Europe. Since that time, these mutations succeeding one another between the 14th and 12th millennium BC, particularly during the Lateglacial warming, were often seen as a real revolution, frequently described through the filter of myths of catastrophes which then inspired and at times still influences prehistoric research.

== Human culture ==
=== Humans ===
No concrete archaeological evidence was found to substantiate a human presence in Egypt throughout this millennium, according to Egyptologists. The time gap has been filled, at least, with comparable discoveries made at Tushka in Egypt during this millennium, showing continuity of human presence in the area from this antiquity all the way down to the start of history.

=== Technology and agriculture ===
The frequency of occurrence of fundamental tool groups such as end-scrapers, burins, truncated pieces, backed pieces, perforators, and combination tools in Moravian inventory is most closely matched and is dated to the late 13th – early 11th millennium BC. From the 17th to the 9th millennium BC, no surface pressure flaking technology is known to have existed in Europe. Only this millennium has the first conclusive evidence for deep-sea fishing and navigation in the Strait of Gibraltar crossing.

In Early Pre-Pottery Neolithic, the seeds of bitter vetch were found among both the earliest findings of wild collected plants from this millennium and the storages of domesticated crops of the Near East Neolithic. The Neolithic era was originated with agriculture in the Middle East around this millennium.

=== Other cultural developments ===
The Hamburg cultures prevailed in Schleswig-Holstein around the second half of this millennium. The sites, Göbekli Tepe, Gusir Höyük, Nevali Çori, and Karahan Tepe, have generated convincing proof of public rituals performed by shaman-like ritual practitioners and also indicate that collective celebrations of rites and rituals have existed since this millennium. McNeish's excavations in Mexico's Tehuacan Valley have revealed a series of cave cultural layers dating back to this millennium. Jebel Sahaba, a prehistoric site of protracted violence, probably dates to this millennium.

== Bibliography ==
=== Webpages ===
- Boucherit, Gilles (13 June 2014). "Irish and Breton Megalithism". hal.science. Bretagne/Irlande : Quelles relations?. Centre De Recherche Bretonne Et Celtique: 13.

=== Books ===
- Bechtold, Thomas; Mussak, Rita (6 April 2009). Handbook of Natural Colorants. John Wiley & Sons. p. 3. ISBN 9780470744963.
- Arbuckle, Benjamin S. (2012). "11". In Potts, D.T (ed.). Animals in the Ancient World (PDF) (1st ed.). Blackwell Publishing. p. 210.
- Desrosiers, Pierre M. (13 March 2012). The Emergence of Pressure Blade Making: from Origin to Modern Experimentation. Springer New York. p. 269. ISBN 9781461420033.
- Bauval, Robert; Brophy, Thomas (September 2013). "1". Imhotep the African: Architect of the Cosmos. Red Wheel Weiser. ISBN 9781609258603.

=== Journals ===
- Binois, Annelise; Bridault, Anne; Pion, Gilbert; Ducrocq, Thierry (March 2014). "Dental Development Pathology in Wild artiodactyls: Two Prehistoric Case Studies from France". International Journal of Paleopathology. 4 (1): 53–58. doi:10.1016/j.ijpp.2013.11.002. PMID 29539502.
- Mikić, Aleksandar (5 March 2016). "Presence of Vetches (Vicia spp.) in Agricultural and Wild Floras of Ancient Europe". Genetic Resources and Crop Evolution. 63 (4): 745–754. doi:10.1007/s10722-016-0382-3. S2CID 254506719.
- Valentin, Boris (2008). "Magdalenian and Azilian Lithic Productions in the Paris Basin: Disappearance of a Programmed Economy". The Arkotek Journal. 2 (1).
- Kobusiewicz, Michał (1973). "Problems concerning Hamburgian Culture in Central Europe". Przegląd Archeologiczny. 21 (1): 75.
- Crevecoeur, Isabelle; Dias-Meirinho, Marie-Hélène; Zazzo, Antoine; Antoine, Daniel; Bon, François (2021). "New insights on interpersonal violence in the Late Pleistocene based on the Nile valley cemetery of Jebel Sahaba" (PDF). Scientific Reports. 11 (1): 9991. Bibcode:2021NatSR..11.9991C. doi:10.1038/s41598-021-89386-y. ISSN 2045-2322. PMC 8159958. PMID 34045477.
- Kabo, Vladimir; Y'Edynak, Gloria; Forni, Gaetano; Galvin, Kathleen F.; Heskel, Dennis L.; Rosen, Steven A.; Shnirelman, V. A.; Smith, Andrew B.; Watkins, Trevor (1985). "The Origins of the Food-producing Economy [and Comments and Reply]". Current Anthropology. 26 (5): 607. doi:10.1086/203349. JSTOR 2743082. S2CID 156036244.
- Otte, Marcel (2009). "The Paleolithic-Mesolithic Transition" (PDF). Sourcebook of Paleolithic Transitions. Vol. 1. p. 538. doi:10.1007/978-0-387-76487-0_35. ISBN 978-0-387-76478-8. Archived from the original (PDF) on 21 April 2025.
- Fereidoun, Biglari (January 2010). "Iranian Archaeology 1, Special Issue on Paleolithic Period". Iranian Archaeology. 1 (1): 35.
- Wiśniewski, Tomasz S; Mroczek, Przemysław; Rodzik, Jan; Zagórski, Piotr; Wilczyński, Jacek R; Fišáková, Miriam Nývltová (25 October 2012). "Erratum to "On the Periphery of the Magdalenian World: an open-air Site in Klementowice (Lublin Upland, Eastern Poland)" [Quat. Int. 272–273 (2012) 308–321]" (PDF). Quaternary International. 276–277 (1): 309. Bibcode:2012QuInt.276..300W. doi:10.1016/j.quaint.2012.08.2106.
- Graciá, Eva; Giménez, Andrés; Anadón, José Daniel; Harris, D. James; Fritz, Uwe; Botella, Francisco (February 2013). "The Uncertainty of Late Pleistocene Range Expansions in the Western Mediterranean: a Case Study of the Colonization of south-eastern Spain by the spur-thighed tortoise,Testudo graeca". Journal of Biogeography. 40 (2): 323–334. Bibcode:2013JBiog..40..323G. doi:10.1111/jbi.12012. hdl:10261/72475. S2CID 44550153.
- Wyatt, Nick; Wyatt, Simon (2014). "The Longue Durée in the Beef Business". p. 424.
- Kolankaya-Bostanci, Neyir (1 June 2014). "The Evidence of Shamanism Rituals in Early Prehistoric Periods of Europe and Anatolia". Colloquium Anatolicum. 1 (13): 190.
