= Biagi =

Biagi can refer to:

- Carlo Biagi (1914–1986), an Italian football (soccer) player who competed in the 1936 Summer Olympics
- Enzo Biagi (1920–2007), an Italian journalist and writer
- George Biagi (born 1985), an Italian/Scottish rugby union player
- Giuseppe Biagi (explorer) (1897–1965), an Italian soldier, explorer and radio operator
- Giuseppe Biagi (painter) (born 1949), an Italian painter and member of the Metacosa Movement
- Marco Biagi (1950–2002), an Italian jurist
- Marco Biagi (born 1982), a Scottish politician
- Maria Luisa Altieri Biagi (1930–2017), an Italian scholar and writer
- Mattia Biagi (born 1974), an Italian professional artist
- Paolo Biagi (born 1948), an Italian archaeologist
- Pete Biagi (born 1963), a cinematographer
- Rodolfo Biagi (1906–1969), an Argentine Tango musician
- Thomas Biagi (born 1976), a professional racecar driver from Italy
