= Paolo Biagi =

Italian archaeologist

- Born: 30 January 1948 (age 78); Brescia, Italy
- Education: University of Milan; UCL Institute of Archaeology
- Scientific career
- Workplaces: Natural History Museum of Brescia; University of Genoa; Ca' Foscari University of Venice

Paolo Biagi (born 1948) is an Italian archaeologist specialising in the prehistory of Southeast Europe, Russia and the Caucasus, and Southwest Asia. He is currently a professor at the Ca' Foscari University of Venice.

== Education and career ==
Biagi obtained a laurea from the University of Milan in 1972 and a PhD from the Institute of Archaeology in London in 1981. He has held academic positions at the Natural History Museum of Brescia (1978–1981), the University of Genoa (1981–1988), and the Ca' Foscari University of Venice (1988–present). He became a full professor (professore ordinario) of prehistory and protohistory in the Department of Asian and North African Studies at Ca' Foscari in 2002. He is currently Senior Researcher of the same University

Biagi has been director of the Italian Archaeological Mission in the Banat and Transylvania (Romania) and is at present the director of the Italian Archaeological Mission in Sindh and Las Bela (Balochistan), Pakistan since 1993. He also directed the Italian Archaeological Expedition in Oman (1990–1991). He is conducting archaeological research in the Central Alpine arc, the Pindos Mountains and the island of Lemnos (Greece), the Caucasus of Georgia, and Sindh and Las Bela (Pakistan). He is approved High Education Commission of Pakistan supervisor of Quaid-i-Azam PhD students.

Biagi is an Honorary Fellow of the Society of Antiquaries of London, an honorary professor of Odessa and Nikolaev Universities and was awarded a gold medal from Shah Abdul Latif University in 1999.
