= Filiz İşikırık =

Turkish footballer (born 1993)

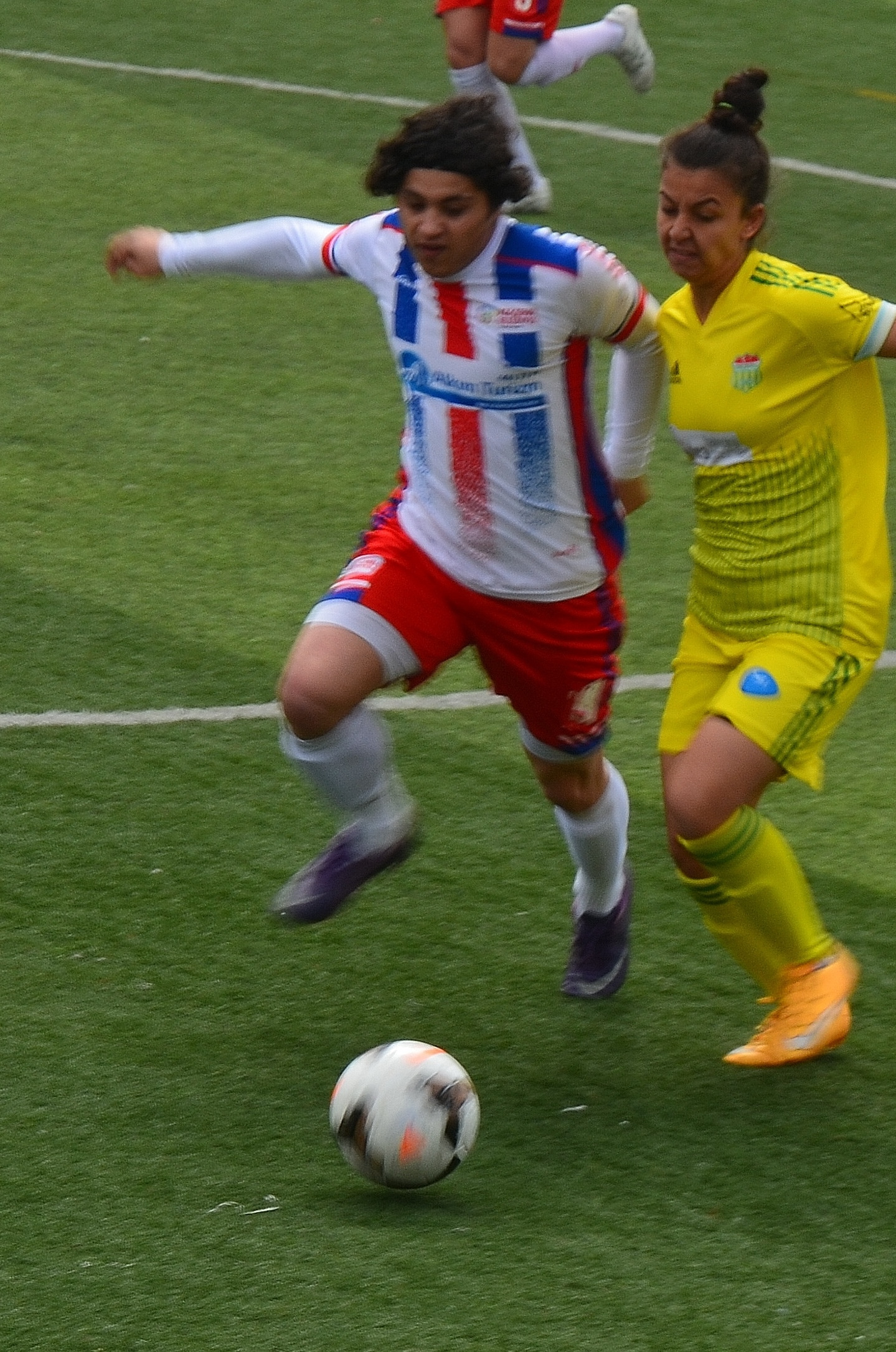
- Filiz İşikırık (left) playing for Ataşehir Belediyespor in the 2015–16 season against Kireçburnu Spor

Personal information
- Date of birth: August 20, 1993 (age 33)
- Place of birth: Siverek, Şanlıurfa, Turkey
- Position: Forward

Team information
- Current team: Ataşehir Belediyespor
- Number: 63

Senior career*
Years	Team	Apps	(Gls)
2009	Gazikentspor	4	(3)
2009–2011	Gölcükspor	36	(42)
2011–2012	Lüleburgaz 39 Spor	19	(17)
2012–2014	Trabzon İdmanocağı	27	(23)
2015–2016	76 Iğdır Spor	7	(9)
2016–	Ataşehir Belediyespor	9	(6)
Total		102	(100)

International career^{‡}
2009	Turkey U-17	2	(0)
2012	Turkey U-19	12	(9)
2012	Turkey	2	(0)
- * Club domestic league appearances and goals as of March 27, 2016 ‡ National team caps and goals as of July 8, 2012

Filiz İşikırık (born August 20, 1993, in Siverek, Şanlıurfa, Turkey) is a Turkish women's football forward currently playing in the Turkish Women's First Football League for Ataşehir Belediyespor with jersey number 63. She appeared in the Turkey women's national football team.

== Playing career ==
=== Club ===
İşikırık obtained her license on February 5, 2009, for Gazikentspor. After playing one season in the Women's Second League and capping four times, she transferred to Gölcükspor. At the end of her first season, she enjoyed promotion of her team to the Women's First League. For Gölcükspor, İşikırık capped 36 times and netted 42 goals before she signed with Lüleburgaz 39 Spor for the 2011–12 season. She scored 17 goals in 19 matches in one season for Lüleburgaz 39 Spor. İşikırık was with Trabzon İdmanocağı two seasons from the 2012–13 season.

She transferred to the Third League team 76 Iğdır Spor in the beginning of 2015. The next year, İşikırık signed with the Istanbul-based club Atalehir Belediyespor to play in the Women's First league again.

=== International ===
She played two matches for the Turkey national U-17 team, and 12 matches for the Turkey national U-19 team. She was twice in the Turkey nationals.

== Career statistics ==
As of March 27, 2016

Club	Season	League			Continental		National		Total	
Club	Season	Division	Apps	Goals	Apps	Goals	Apps	Goals	Apps	Goals
Gazikentspor	2008–09	Second League	4	3	–	–	1	0	5	3
Gazikentspor	Total		4	3	–	–	1	0	5	3
Gölcükspor	2009–10	Second League	17	27	–	–	1	0	18	27
Gölcükspor	2010–11	First League	19	15	–	–	0	0	19	15
Gölcükspor	Total		36	42	–	–	1	0	37	42
Lüleburgaz 39 Spor	2011–12	First League	19	17	–	–	11	9	30	26
Lüleburgaz 39 Spor	Total		19	17	–	–	11	9	30	26
Trabzon İdmanocağı	2012–13	First League	17	16	–	–	3	0	20	16
Trabzon İdmanocağı	2013–14	First League	10	7	–	–	0	0	10	7
Trabzon İdmanocağı	Total		27	23	–	–	3	0	30	23
76 Iğdır Spor	2014–15	Third League	3	5	–	–	0	0	3	5
76 Iğdır Spor	2015–16	Third League	4	4	–	–	0	0	4	4
76 Iğdır Spor	Total		7	9	–	–	0	0	7	9
Ataşehir Belediyespor	2015–16	First League	9	6	–	–	0	0	9	6
Ataşehir Belediyespor	Total		9	6	–	–	0	0	9	6
Career total			102	100	–	–	16	9	118	109

== Honours ==
Turkish Women's First League

Ataşehir Belediyespor
Runners-up (1): 2015–16
