= Filiz Kocaman =

Turkish volleyball player (born 1985)

Filiz Kocaman (born February 23, 1985, in Tokat) is a Turkish volleyball player. She is 178 cm tall and plays as a libero. She has been playing for Fenerbahçe Women's Volleyball Team since 2007 season start and wears number 14. She has played 43 times for the national team. She has also played for Eczacıbaşı, Şişli, Yalovaspor and Konya Selçuk University.

== See also ==
- Turkish women in sports
