= Atalay Filiz =

Turkish serial killer

- Born: June 2, 1986 (age 40); Bandırma, Balıkesir, Turkey
- Other names: Furkan Altın, Omer Baba, Selim
- Conviction: Murder
- Penalty: Life imprisonment

Details
- Victims: 3–4
- Span of crimes: 2012–2016
- Country: Turkey, France
- Date apprehended: June 12, 2016
- Imprisoned at: Silivri Prison

Atalay Filiz (born June 2, 1986) is a Turkish serial killer. He is held responsible for at least three murders, possibly for one in 2012, two in September 2013 and one in May 2016. A fugitive for more than two years, he was captured in June 2016.

== Early life ==
He was educated at Galatasaray High School, one of the most prominent high schools of Turkey, in Istanbul, and graduated with honors. His teachers remark that "he is so intelligent that he could survive in a jungle when left alone." Filiz stated that he entered the OSS (a higher-education test, similar to the SATs or ACTs but geared towards a specific career path/profession, somewhat like the ASVAB test in the U.S.) in 2005 but his aim was not to pass the exam, but to study abroad, so he deliberately mislabeled the questions he could make out. In college, Filiz studied biology in the University of Paris-Sud in France. However, he did not attend classes, take exams and couldn't finish school due to a lack of money. In 2010, he came back Turkey and told his family he was going to study for his doctorate in Ankara. After the allegations of his crimes, it was revealed that he was never registered for a doctorate degree in Ankara.

== Disappearance of Olga Seregina ==
Filiz met Seregina in October 2008, when she arrived in Paris on a student exchange program. They continued to chat via the Internet while Filiz stayed in Paris until 2010, when Olga and her friend Elena Radchikova returned to Paris again. They decided to stay with Filiz and Göktuğ Demirarslan, dividing the rent. Göktuğ and Elena eventually fell in love with each other, and after a year of disagreements they both moved to a different home, not hearing from Filiz until 2013. Upon Filiz's invitation, Olga came to Fethiye in August 2011 and stayed with him and his family in their house for a week. The duo later went on holiday together, but on August 31, Olga returned to Paris and told her friends that she had a conflict with Filiz and left him.

Olga's mother Luy stated that Filiz had proposed to during their holiday in Fethiye, with her daughter asking him to come to Paris with her, with Filiz refusing because he couldn't go. Filiz later enrolled in the army, while Olga began working as a babysitter for a family in Paris. During his military service in Istanbul, Filiz's family offered Olga to stay with them, but she refused. Filiz eventually went to Paris while on a 10-day leave, and Olga soon disappeared. On December 16, 2011, Olga was babysitting for the family when Filiz asked her out for some coffee to celebrate his return. According to Olga's close friend Elena, she had e-mailed her the night before telling that she would meet somebody very important to her. On the same night, she had left for Filiz's house in Paris to get her belongings. Her phone had completely shut down on December 17, 2011, and nobody heard from her again. Olga's childhood friend Yuliya Gordienko, who lived in the same neighborhood, told all about Olga's relationship and how she wanted to end it since August–September 2011, but couldn't. Gordienko stated that she was sure Filiz had killed Olga, since he had become obsessed and constantly threatened her. Her family stated that Russian and French police were not uninterested in the case, but the French police eventually said that "he [Filiz] handed over his cell phone and an old camera, but didn't hand over the new ones."

Detectives investigating the incident indicated that Olga Seregina was likely murdered by Atalay Filiz. When questioned about the disappearance, Filiz blinked and wobbled his head in denial, which they considered to be a sign that he was lying.

The family of Olga had asked the Russian police to break the code and examine her laptop, but they were uninterested. Later, Russian hackers managed to break in, but the only thing they could find was a single photo of Olga with an engagement ring while she was engaged to Filiz, and 4 pictures taken with Göktuğ and Elena.

On June 19, 2016, Olga Seregina's Russian account on the Russian social media website VK was opened for the first time in 5 years. Seregina's family stated that they had broken their daughter's password, but they could not access other content than greeting her friends, also stating that they were displeased with the Turkish police not questioning the disappearance sufficiently.

== Murders ==
Filiz is also suspected of murdering Air vice-marshal Hasan Huseyin Demirarslan's 26-year-old son Göktuğ, a physics engineer, and his 23-year-old Russian girlfriend Elena Radchikova on May 27, 2016.

=== Double murder of Göktuğ Demirarslan and Elena Radchikova ===
In France, Filiz was introduced to Göktuğ Demirarslan and Elena Radchikova by his girlfriend Olga, who came to France in the last year of school through the Erasmus Programme. In 2013, after Demirarslan and Radchikova had returned to Ankara, Filiz suggested during the query that he murdered the couple: "Göktuğ and Elena, they always held me responsible for Olga's disappearance.", saying that he had killed them for what they said.

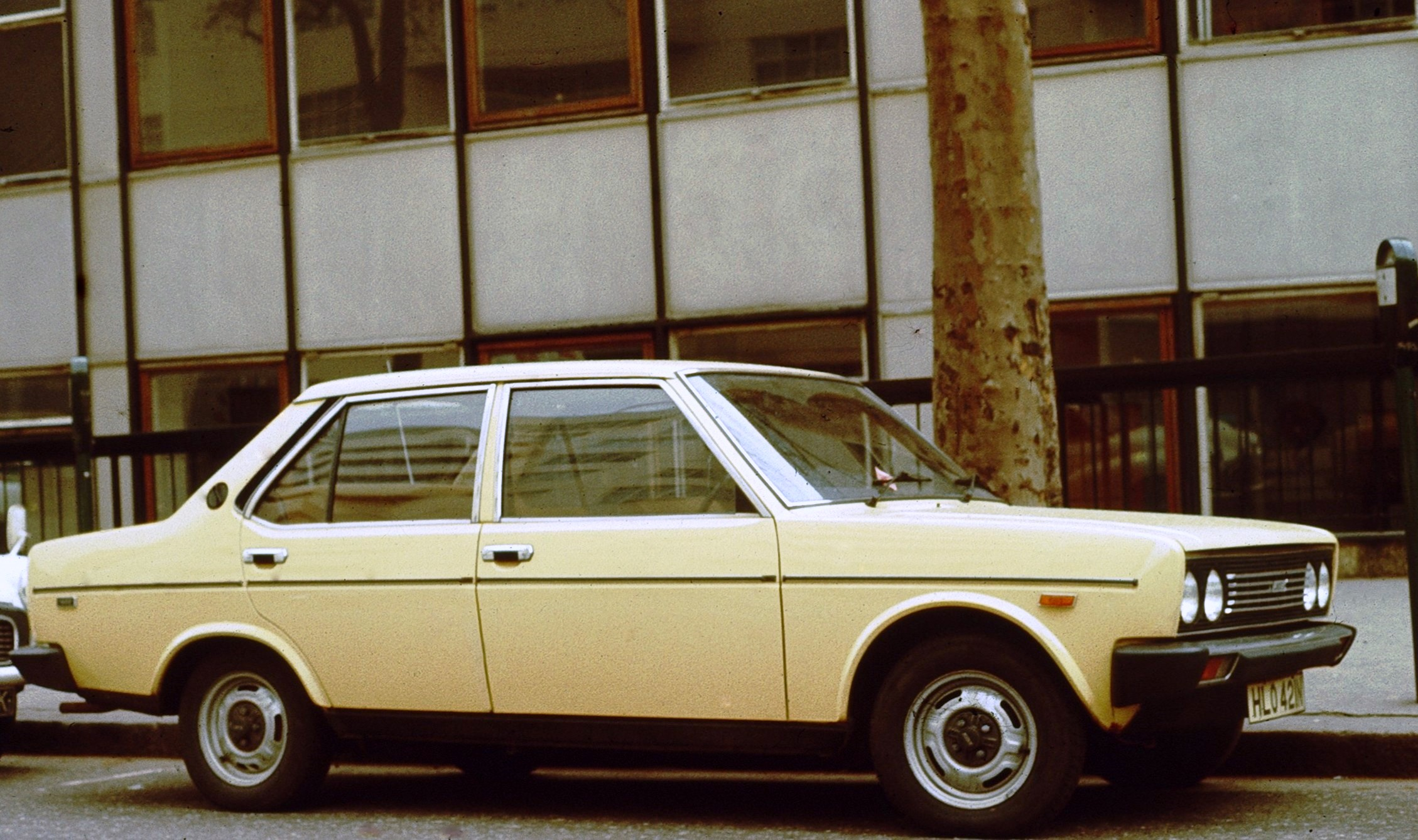
The beige colored Fiat 131 used by Filiz

A close friend of Demirarslan stated in his testimony that Filiz was interested in Elena and that he wanted to be her boyfriend. When he returned to Ankara, Filiz started to send e-mails that he wanted to meet them. When no reply came, he started insulting them in the e-mails. Filiz told Elena that he had recorded a video of Göktuğ kissing another woman and that he had cheated on her, urging her to leave him. After this, Filiz called Demirarslan from a payphone in Ankara's Emek district, saying that there was a cargo in his name. At Hacettepe University's Physics and Engineering Department, he couldn't find Demiarslan's address and asked from other people. Meanwhile, Göktuğ had waited for the "cargo" for 3 days, finally calling the mysterious number and learning that it was from a payphone. Atalay Filiz managed to get Göktuğ's home address after receiving the phone records, examining the neighborhood for months and following the phone signal. He would call Göktuğ's number using payphones during the middle of the night, but he never received an answer. Finally, Demirarslan and his friends called the secret number again, only to see Filiz's old-fashioned car parked by the apartment building when he looked out the window.

Filiz, who was blamed for Olga's disappearance by the couple, decided to get rid of them. When they decided to go on holiday in Antalya, Filiz placed a phone in Göktuğ's car so he could follow them. After two weeks, he realized that they were taking the bus from the same place. In this case, he rented a side room of the hotel they stayed at, where Göktuğ and Elena's room did not have a hidden camera placement plan. Filiz had decided to buy a hunting rifle and had received a report on the presence of mental health issues in order to obtain a rifle license. In his testimony to the Court, he stated that he had been informed that his mental and physical health was intact before he had received the gun and that he had not had received any previous mental treatment. He learned how to use the rifle from the Internet after receiving hunting permission and a shotgun. Filiz then parked his beige Fiat 131 in the entrance of gate C24 of the Atakent Valley Site in Eryaman, and set up an ambush by hiding among the trees. On the day of the event, Filiz had dressed in women's clothes and wore a headscarf. On September 16, 2013, when Göktuğ and Elena approached their home, they were shot at. Filiz fired 5 shots at close range, and as a result killed them both. Göktuğ's skull fragments were splattered as far as 30 meters away. Filiz kept the gun with him while running away, and according to testimonies from inhabitants of the site, he left behind an empty soda bottle. In order to avoid being noticed due to his license plate, he fled to Kütahya and stayed in the car for two days before returning to Istanbul. When he came back, he couldn't find his car.

A month later, the police seized his vehicle and found hair dye and plastic make-up in his car. In addition, they also found an excavator, shovel, carpenter saw with a wooden handle, hacksaw, star and flat-mouth screwdriver, two pieces of a wool blanket, one quilt, a cushion, a big-sized nylon, gel, surgical intervention materials, antifreeze, pliers, a battery charging cable, nylon ropes and cables.

Göktuğ's uncle, Ekrem Demirarslan, said in a statement after the murder that his nephew was murdered on the grounds that he had been working on a big, secret project, but that his nephew was not an expert and a simple physician's assistant in TÜBİTAK two months ago. It was then established that it was a murder based on jealousy.

Some time after the murders, relatives took Demirarslan's car to the service for periodical maintenance. However, the workers found an object put in a bag, which had been inserted in the gasoline vent pipe. When they opened the bag, they found an old-school mobile phone. This was reported by the relatives to the authorities, and as a result from an investigation, police found that the SIM card was registered to Atalay Filiz, who had been using it for three months before the murder.

On October 31, 2013, an arrest warrant was issued for Filiz and on November 12, 2013, a ban was imposed on him to travel abroad. On March 3, 2014, Europol issued a red bulletin to seek out Filiz at an international level. Portugal's Interpol division learned that Filiz had stayed in a Lisbon hotel between January 27 and 31, 2014. His mother and sister were also staying in the city, but in a different hotel. It was determined that to avoid the travel ban, Filiz had used a fake passport and identity to flee.

=== Murder of Fatma Kayıkçı ===
Atalay Filiz, who introduced himself as Furkan Altın after the murders in Ankara, searched for a job on the Internet and started working as a waiter in a tea garden in Tuzla. Thus, he began to work in the tea garden of history teacher Gani Kayıkçı, husband of Fatman Kayıkçı. He told the Kayıkçıs that he came from Ankara and that he had nobody. The first 6 months he did not respond when he was called Furkan, and only when people shouted loudly did he respond. He behaved strangely while working in the tea garden: he would bring lemons to customers who requested them and would then cut them with a large blade used for doner kebab. Once, he squeezed the throat and threatened to kill a girl when she asked him if he was even a male.

Filiz started working in a kebab shop in January 2016. He said that he needed to work there, claiming that he lived in the nearby city of Konya and couldn't afford the money to return there, as he was the only child in his family and that his father was a retired worker. He was subsequently hired as a serviceman. The owner of the kebab shop stated that Filiz was a strange man, who would go to the pharmacy when they wanted him to go buy cigarettes. He wouldn't talk about the schools he studied and never spoke to tourists, even though he knew 4 foreign languages. The owner also stated that Filiz always avoided cameras on the roads while distributing the food, and used intermediate roads. When asked why he did so, he replied that he only knew about the intermediate roads. Filiz also did not use a mobile phone, instead reading newspapers to keep up with the news; he was an extremely straightforward man who had no friends and did not spend any money, even taking his water from the restaurant, because he was "very fond" of money and very persistent. Filiz eventually left his job, two months before killing Fatman Kayıkçı, claiming that his grandparents were going to visit him in Ankara, and so he wanted to leave and get his money willingly. The owner considered Filiz extremely meticulous, saying that if were to be left alone in the forest, he could even eat the grass.

The Kayıkçı family paid him 1,250 pounds a month and gave him food from the house. However, the tea garden eventually closed down, and he became unemployed, but still lived at the house. In the meantime, Fatma Kayıkçı, who used a room in the house as a warehouse, suspected that she had confused her belongings with his. On May 27, 2016, Fatma greeted him by saying: "Good morning Atalay, what's up?". Filiz stated she had learned of his identity and thought she was going to report him to the authorities for the murders in Ankara. In his statement, he said: "I stabbed Fatma Kayıkçı, with a knife, she was a really small person. She had difficulty keeping her suitcase."

It was determined that Filiz had wanted to kill Fatma Kayıkçı by cutting off her head, but when she resisted, he killed her with 11 stabs to the back, chin, chest and knee. Fatma had left home to take her child from school at noon but did not reach the school nor return home. Upon her family's request, the police searched for Kayıkçı and eventually found her body in a greenery 500 meters away from her home. Filiz had discarded her body from the trunk of his car after leaving the house with his suitcase at around 2 PM.

In his testimony, Filiz stated that he felt uncomfortable to leave and one month before the murder he had rented a house on the ground floor in the Esenler neighborhood of Pendik, which was why he had prepared his suitcase to leave.

== Escape and arrest ==
After the murder, Filiz went to Kaynarca, then to Gebze Bus Station in Adapazarı, staying in a hotel for a day using a false identity. He then traveled first to Buca and then to Gümüldür, deciding to hide in the Gümüldür Özdere National Park. He told the fishermen he encountered there that his family was broke and therefore he went on vacation. Filiz remained in the wooded area for about a week. However, he decided to go to Menderes for a day and find a house to stay in, because he had not washed for a week.

One day before his arrest, Filiz met a lumberjack from Urfa who had been working in Menderes' Karadayı District, asking the man to let him stay in his home. The lumberjack then showed Filiz the two bedroom house of his brother-in-law. Filiz liked the house and offered 500 pounds for it, also saying that he could do any job for the lumberjack, even work for him if needed. However, the woodsman became suspicious and asked for his identity, upon which Atalay Filiz claimed he had forgotten his ID card and had to go back and get it, but instead fled. It was determined that he stayed in the barracks near Şaşal Village for a few nights after that.

Filiz eventually got onto a minibus, where a person recognized him. The passenger eventually disembarked from the bus and notified the authorities, who later stopped the bus. They found two hunting knives, pepper spray, 4 fake IDS, 3 fake driver's licenses, 14 credit cards, a French citizenship certificate, 10, 000 lire and 3,500 euros on him.

In addition, he had booklets showing camp sites and parks, eight candy bars to balance his blood sugar, a list of porn actresses written on a kebab order slip, a list of child care firms abroad, childhood photos, film and music CDs. In another note, he wrote the names of the movies Natural Born Killers, The Usual Suspects and Reservoir Dogs.

Filiz also used gels to prevent flies and other animals from attacking him, also wore gloves, shawls or berets. He had a key to a bank vault, a passport in his name, a document containing citizenship information of a French look-alike, a shaver, lenses, childhood photographs of himself and his friends, and two camping sites. He had gone to Indonesia in 2012 with his own passport, which had long expired. In his statements, he said that knew all the poisonous insects and frogs, and survived by eating various animals. He kept items used in daily life in his luggage, but disposed of books that burdened him in various places. He claimed that he would go to Istanbul to visit his family, if he didn't miss his mother at all. Filiz explained that he had no intention of going to Greece, as he knew the Greek police would arrest and extradite him. He survived by working two different jobs for 17 hours a day, saving money by working as a waiter and guard. In his statement to the press that questioned him, the İzmir Police Chief told that Filiz looked very nice, and that he was a very smart and cheerful boy who did not regret doing what he did.

During the period that Filiz was a fugitive, the police were informed that he had a warehouse in Hadımköy, and observed the house on June 2, 2016. A 2-meter wooden chest was opened with the help of a locksmith. In the trunk there were murder novels, cycling, weight instruments, murder films and CDs of the Dexter series were found. It was determined that Filiz had sent goods to a warehouse four years ago through a cargo company.

== Trial ==
Atalay Filiz was brought to Istanbul after being arrested and questioned by the prosecutor. After the questioning, he was referred to the court, demanding that he be charged with manslaughter and plundering. He was questioned by the judge at the Anatolian 8th Criminal Court of Peace. He accepted the killings he had committed but refused to accept the plundering charge. He explained that Fatma Kayıkçı did not have any money in her bag, and even if she did, he would not have taken it because he already had a monthly income of 1800 pounds. The judge ruled that he had been arrested for homicide, but not be detained on account of plundering for lack of sufficient evidence. After his arrest, Filiz was sent to the Silivri Prison.

Filiz asked to be put in a solitary cell and not in the dormitory, because he feared that he would be killed while transported from İzmir to Istanbul. This request was well-received and he was put into the quarantine ward of the Silivri Prison. He woke up in the morning and asked for some books and newspapers for reading.

Soon, in Ankara, he was put on trial for the two murders. Filiz rejected the lawyer appointed to him by the Ankara Bar Association and said that he would not give a statement unless the lawyer Vildan Yirmibesoglu was appointed. The judge called Yirmibesoglu and convinced him to take Filiz as his client. He stated in his testimony that the newspapers received encrypted messages and he committed the murders according to these messages. It was then decided that forensic medicine should be taken to report whether his mental health was in place, and the hearing was postponed.

Filiz was examined on June 27, 2016, to determine whether he was mentally stable. The Committee concluded that Atalay Filiz's mental health was intact and that his criminal liability was complete. After having his request to be admitted to the hospital rejected, Filiz was sent back to Silivri Prison.

== Social impact ==
Atalay Filiz was the subject of a documentary series hosted by Müge Anlı, who showed Filiz's room during the program. A young girl, who saw her own cat's leash in the murderer's room, contacted the program by telephone and stated that he had killed her cat. According to people working at the tea garden, Filiz bought livers for 3 pounds a day to feed 12 cats, who suddenly disappeared one day.

In addition, numerous social networking sites such as Twitter and Facebook took down fake accounts claiming to Atalay Filiz.

Filiz has also been featured on the cover of the June 16, 2016 edition of the cartoon magazine "Uykusuz".

After his arrest, three police officers who took a selfie with the murderer were suspended until the investigation was completed.

In the hospital where Filiz was taken for a health check, Yeşim Göker, a hospital security guard, walked by his room, laughed and took a selfie with him. He later admitted that the selfie was his.

Turkish actor Özcan Deniz made a selfie with an assistant who looked like Atalay Filiz while filming a movie, and shared the photo on his social media account. He later removed the photo after the negative reactions.

== See also ==
- List of serial killers by country
