= 9th millennium BC =

Millennium between 9000 BC and 8001 BC

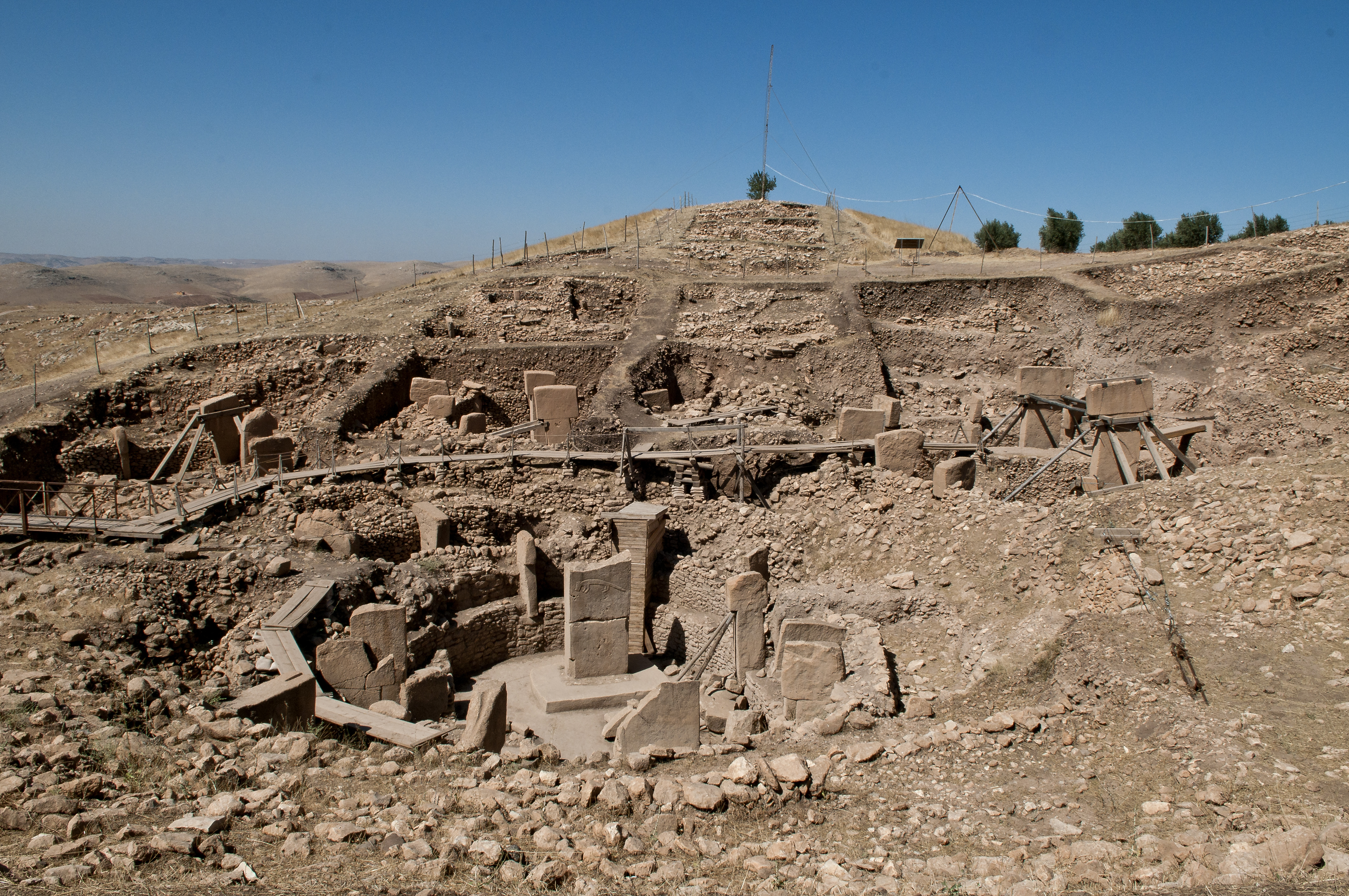
Göbekli Tepe, Şanlıurfa, 2011

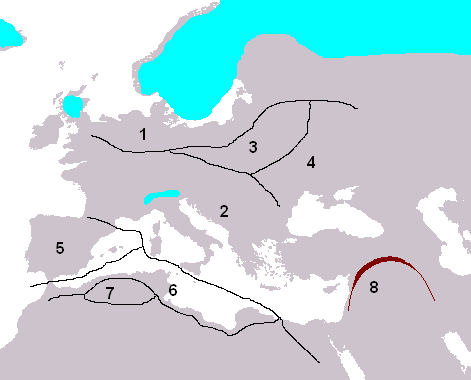
Europe and surrounding areas in the 9th millennium BC. Blue areas are covered in ice.: 1. Upper Palaeolithic cultures.; 2. Mesolithic cultures.; 3. Swiderian cultures.; 4. Pontic Tardenoisian cultures.; 5. Iberian Capsian cultures.; 6. Oranian cultures.; 7. Lower Capsian cultures.; 8. The Fertile Crescent.

The 9th millennium BC spanned the years 9000 BC to 8001 BC (11 to 10 thousand years ago). In chronological terms, it is the first full millennium of the current Holocene epoch that is generally reckoned to have begun by 9700 BC (11.7 thousand years ago). It is impossible to precisely date events that happened around the time of this millennium and all dates mentioned here are estimates mostly based on geological and anthropological analysis, or by radiometric dating.

In the Near East, especially in the Fertile Crescent, the transitory Epipalaeolithic age was gradually superseded by the Neolithic with evidence of agriculture across the Levant to the Zagros Mountains in modern-day Iran. The key characteristic of the Neolithic is agricultural settlement, albeit with wooden and stone tools and weapons still in use. It is believed that agriculture had begun in China by the end of the millennium. Elsewhere, especially in Europe, the Palaeolithic continued.

== Global environment ==
In the geologic time scale, the first stratigraphic stage of the Holocene is the "Greenlandian" from about 9700 BC to the fixed date 6236 BC and so including the whole of the 9th millennium. The starting point for the Greenlandian has been correlated with the end of the Younger Dryas and a climate shift from near-glacial to interglacial, causing glaciers to retreat and sea levels to rise.

It has been estimated that the Bering Land Bridge was inundated around 8500 BC by the rising sea levels so that North America and Asia were again separated by the waters of the Bering Strait and the Chukchi Sea. It is generally believed that there was a migration across the land bridge from eastern Siberia into North America during the Last Glacial Maximum. Sometime after the American glaciers melted, these peoples expanded southward into the wider continent to become the Native Americans. After the land bridge was inundated by the rising sea water, no further migration was possible from Siberia.

During the millennium, there were three known volcanic eruptions which registered magnitude 5 or more on the volcanic explosivity index (VEI). These were at Ulleungdo (aka Ulreung), an island east of the Korean Peninsula about 8750 BC; Grímsvötn, north east Iceland about 8230 BC; and Taupo Caldera, New Zealand about 8130 BC. The biggest eruption was at Grímsvötn, VEI 6, producing some 15 km^{3} (3.6 cu mi) of tephra.

== Population and communities ==
As the Neolithic began in the Fertile Crescent, most people around the world still lived in scattered hunter-gatherer communities which remained firmly in the Palaeolithic. The world population was probably stable and slowly increasing. It has been estimated that there were some five million people in 10,000 BC growing to forty million by 5000 BC and 100 million by 1600 BC. That is an average growth rate of 0.027% per annum from the beginning of the Neolithic to the Middle Bronze Age.

=== Near East ===
From the beginning of the 9th millennium, Göbekli Tepe was inhabited after possibly being first occupied during the previous millennium. It is a carved stone hilltop sanctuary in south-eastern Anatolia which includes the world's oldest known megaliths. As with Göbekli Tepe, the site at Tell Qaramel, in north-west Syria, was inhabited from 9000 BC following possible first occupation in the previous millennium. In the same region, the settlement at Nevalı Çori has been dated about 8500 BC. Elsewhere in the Fertile Crescent, there is evidence of settlements at Mureybet and Ganj Dareh from around 8500 BC. Towards the end of the millennium, by 8200 BC, the site of Aşıklı Höyük in central Anatolia was first occupied (until around 7400 BC).

=== Europe ===
It is believed that European sites settled before 8500 were still Palaeolithic, or at best Mesolithic, communities. At Star Carr in North Yorkshire, the results of radiocarbon analysis in 2018 indicate that occupation first commenced between 9335 and 9275 BC, lasting for a period of around 800 years until 8525–8440 BC, although such occupations may have been episodic in nature, varying in intensity between different periods. Archaeological excavations at Cramond in prehistoric Scotland have uncovered evidence of habitation dating to around 8500 BC. Another settlement may have been established at Ærø in Denmark.

=== Japan ===
In Japan, the Jōmon culture had probably been established by small communities on the Pacific side of Honshu by this time. The word means "cord-pattern", referring to the distinctive pottery of the period. As there was no potter's wheel, the clay was prepared in the shape of a rope and manually coiled upwards to create a vessel that was baked in an open fire. At first, the vessels were simple bowls and jars but later became artistic. Proposed dates for the start of the Jomon are wildly variable, ranging from the Ice Ages to as late as c. 4500. It is generally accepted that the period ended c. 300 BC when it was superseded by the Yayoi culture.

=== Americas ===
In North America, the Paleo-Indian Clovis culture is believed to have ended around 8800 BC having fathered numerous local variants. One of these was the Folsom complex which was centred in the Great Plains and is dated from c. 9000 to c. 8000 BC. The people were hunter-gatherers who hunted the now-extinct Bison antiquus.

In Patagonia, the Fell's Tradition prevailed through the millennium at Cueva Fell. Another Paleo-Indian site in the region is the Las Cuevas Canyon near Los Toldos (Santa Cruz), where rock art has been found.

In Central America, remains of three prehistoric human fossils have been discovered since 2006 in the cave system at Chan Hol in Quintana Roo, Mexico. All have been dated to around the 9th millennium.

=== Early warfare ===
Evidence of a precursor to warfare has been found at Nataruk in Kenya. Remains of at least 27 individuals have been found and dated to 7550–8550 BC. The condition of the skeletons indicates that a massacre took place as hands were bound and skulls were smashed by blunt force. Communities in Africa at the time would have been nomadic hunter-gatherers.

== Rise of agriculture ==
The Natufian culture continued to prevail in the Levantine and upper Mesopotamian areas of the Fertile Crescent with their most significant site at Jericho (Tell es-Sultan) in the Jordan Valley. The Natufian people had been sedentary or semi-sedentary through the 10th millennium, even before the introduction of agriculture.

By about 8500 BC, the Natufians were harvesting wild wheat with flint-edged sickles. It was around that time, or soon afterwards, that the wild wheat crossed with a natural goat grass to form emmer, the seeds of which could scatter in the wind to spread naturally. Later, emmer crossed with another goat grass to form the even larger hybrid that is bread wheat. The Natufians learned how to harvest the new wheat, grind it into flour and make bread. The early bread was unleavened, with the dough allowed to dry on hot stones. Writing in 1973, Jacob Bronowski argued that the combination of wheat and water at Jericho enabled man to begin civilisation. Jericho, having a natural spring, was an oasis on the edge of the Syrian Desert and, although similar developments occurred elsewhere, Bronowski called Jericho "a microcosm of history".

The earliest known cultivation of lentils was at Mureybet in Syria, where wheat and barley were also grown. Lentils were later (by 7500 BC) found at Hacılar Höyük and Çayönü in Turkey. Ganj Dareh, in Iranian Kurdistan, has been cited as the earliest settlement to domesticate animals, specifically the goat, towards the end of the millennium.

Agriculture may have begun in the Far East before 8300 BC, the estimated date for the earliest cultivation of common millet. Proso millet (Panicum miliaceum) and foxtail millet (Setaria italica) were important crops beginning in the Early Neolithic of China. Some of the earliest evidence of millet cultivation in China was found at Cishan (north), where proso millet husk phytoliths and biomolecular components have been identified around 10,300–8,700 years ago in storage pits along with remains of pit-houses, pottery, and stone tools related to millet cultivation.

== Pottery and dating systems ==
Beginning with China c. 18,000 BC, pottery is believed to have been invented independently in various places – for example, at Ounjougou in central Mali (dated c. 9400 BC). These early innovations were probably created accidentally by fires lit on clay soil. The potter's wheel had not yet been invented and, where pottery as such was made, it was still hand-built, often by means of coiling, and pit fired.

The first chronological pottery system was the Early, Middle and Late Minoan framework devised in the early 20th century by Sir Arthur Evans for his Bronze Age findings at Knossos for the period c. 2800 BC to c. 1050 BC. Dame Kathleen Kenyon was the principal archaeologist at Tell es-Sultan (ancient Jericho) and she discovered that there was no pottery there. The vessels she found were made from stone and she reasonably surmised that others made from wood or vegetable fibres would have long since decayed. Using Evans' system as a benchmark, Kenyon divided the Near East Neolithic into phases called Pre-Pottery Neolithic A (PPNA), from c. 10,000 BC to c. 8800 BC; Pre-Pottery Neolithic B (PPNB), from c. 8800 BC to c. 6500 BC; and then Pottery Neolithic (PN), which had varied start-points from c. 6500 BC until the beginnings of the Bronze Age towards the end of the 4th millennium. At the beginning of the 9th millennium, the Natufian culture co-existed with the PPNA which prevailed in the Levantine and upper Mesopotamian areas of the Fertile Crescent.

== Metallurgy ==
Copper (Cu, 29) was originally found in raw surface lumps and first used in the Middle East. It was later extracted from ores such as malachite. A copper pendant from Mesopotamia is dated 8700 BC. The use of copper and, from the eighth millennium, lead (Pb, 82) was gradual – it could not become widespread until systematic processes had been developed for extraction of the metals from their ores; this did not happen until about the sixth millennium.

== Bibliography ==
- Bellwood, Peter (30 November 2004). First Farmers: The Origins of Agricultural Societies. Wiley-Blackwell. p. 384. ISBN 978-06-31205-66-1.
- Bronowski, Jacob (1973). The Ascent of Man. London: BBC. ISBN 978-18-49901-15-4.
- Bury, J. B.; Meiggs, Russell (1975) [first published 1900]. A History of Greece (Fourth ed.). London: Macmillan Press. ISBN 978-03-33154-92-2.
- Chazan, Michael (2017). World Prehistory and Archaeology: Pathways Through Time. Routledge. p. 197. ISBN 978-13-51802-89-5.
- Richard, Suzanne (2004). Near Eastern Archaeology. Eisenbrauns. ISBN 978-15-75060-83-5.
- Roberts, J. M. (1993). Shorter Illustrated History of the World. Abingdon: Helicon Publishing Ltd. ISBN 978-01-95115-04-8.
- Milner, Nicky; Conneller, Chantal; Taylor, Barry (2018). Star Carr: Volume 1: A Persistent Place in a Changing World. York: White Rose University Press. ISBN 978-19-12482-04-7.
- Mithen, Steven (2003). After The Ice. London: Weidenfeld & Nicolson. ISBN 978-07-53813-92-8.
