= Vryokastro =

Archaeological site in Kythnos, Greece

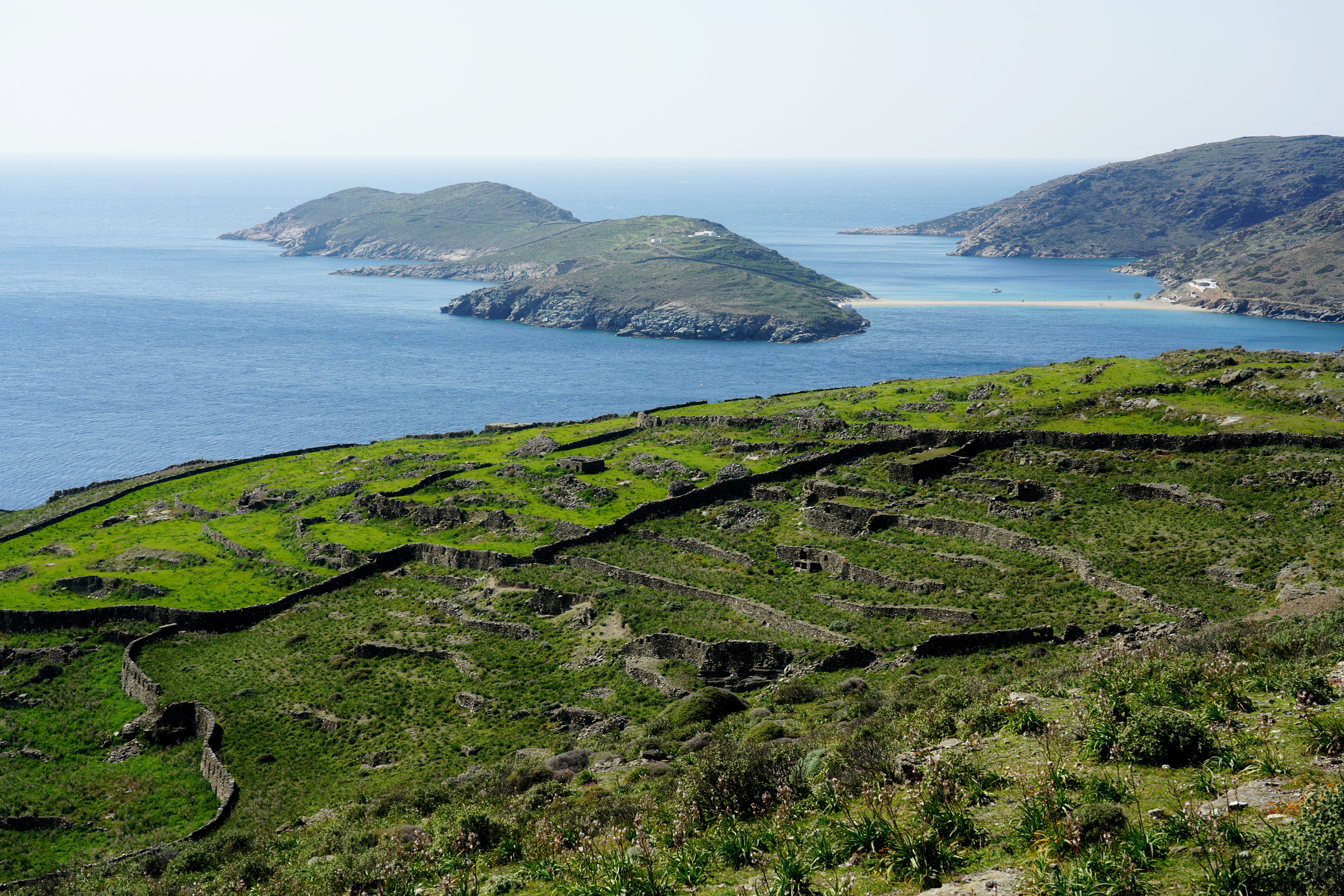
- View of Vryokastro

- Location within Greece
- Type: city
- Location: Kythnos, Greece
- Region: Cycladic Islands

Vryokastro (Greek: Βρυόκαστρο) is an archaeological site in Kythnos, Greece. It is considered as the ancient capital of the island. It was inhabited from the 12th century BC until the Early Middle Ages. It was called Kythnos in the ancient times and the island was named after it. It is also referred to as Ovriokastro and Rigokastro.

== Location ==
Vryokastro is on the northwestern side of the island, between the bays of Merichas and Apokrisi. The town had an area of 300 acres [CONVERT], and was surrounded by city walls. Part of it the town was the present-day rocky islet of Vryokastraki, which was at that time linked to the town by land. Underwater surveys and excavations show that before the sea level rise, which resulted in the separation of the rocky islet from the coast, there were buildings which are now in the water along with the now underwater walls.

== The City ==
The excavation of the area is ongoing. To date, public buildings, an aqueduct, an acropolis, two necropolises, a harbor, a sanctuary, a temple, a monumental mound and a large building of the Classical and Hellenistic period have been found in the settlement's area.

=== Sanctuary ===
From 2000 to 2016 an excavation of an unplundered sanctuary of the Archaic, Classical and Hellenistic periods was performed. The temple of the sanctuary was intact and contained all the offerings in their place. Excavation south of the temple revealed two altars as well as an extensive repository of offerings that also contained hundreds of valuable objects.

=== Monumental mound and public building ===
Located west of the sanctuary its exploration began in 2009. It is thought to be associated with the city's Agora during the Hellenistic period. A little lower than the mound, a two-storey building was excavated that is believed to have been the city's prytaneum (rectorate) during the Classical and Hellenistic period.

=== Upper City sanctuary complex ===
It consists of a series of buildings excavated and reclaimed between 2016 and 2018. These buildings are located in a row of 800 meters length. They are mentioned with caveats as the temples of Asclepius, Cabeiri, Aphrodite, Apollo, and Artemis.

=== Vryokastraki ===
Excavated from 2018 to 2020, its findings document the human presence in the 12th century BC on the island. When in the antiquity it was connected to the coast, it formed the western part of the city's harbor. The excavations revealed a monumental hill, a monumental altar, the first three-aisled Paleochristian basilica found on the island and a 90-metre-long complex of buildings with 15 rectangular rooms.

== Underwater research and excavation ==
From 2005 to 2011 underwater research and excavations were carried out in the ancient port of Vryokastro, present day Mandraki Bay. Buildings were found on the shore and on the seabed, the entire harbor was cartographed, and a building that appears to be part of the wall was excavated.
