= Kakovolo =

Mountain on Kythnos, Greece

Coordinates: 37°26′25″N 24°23′25″E

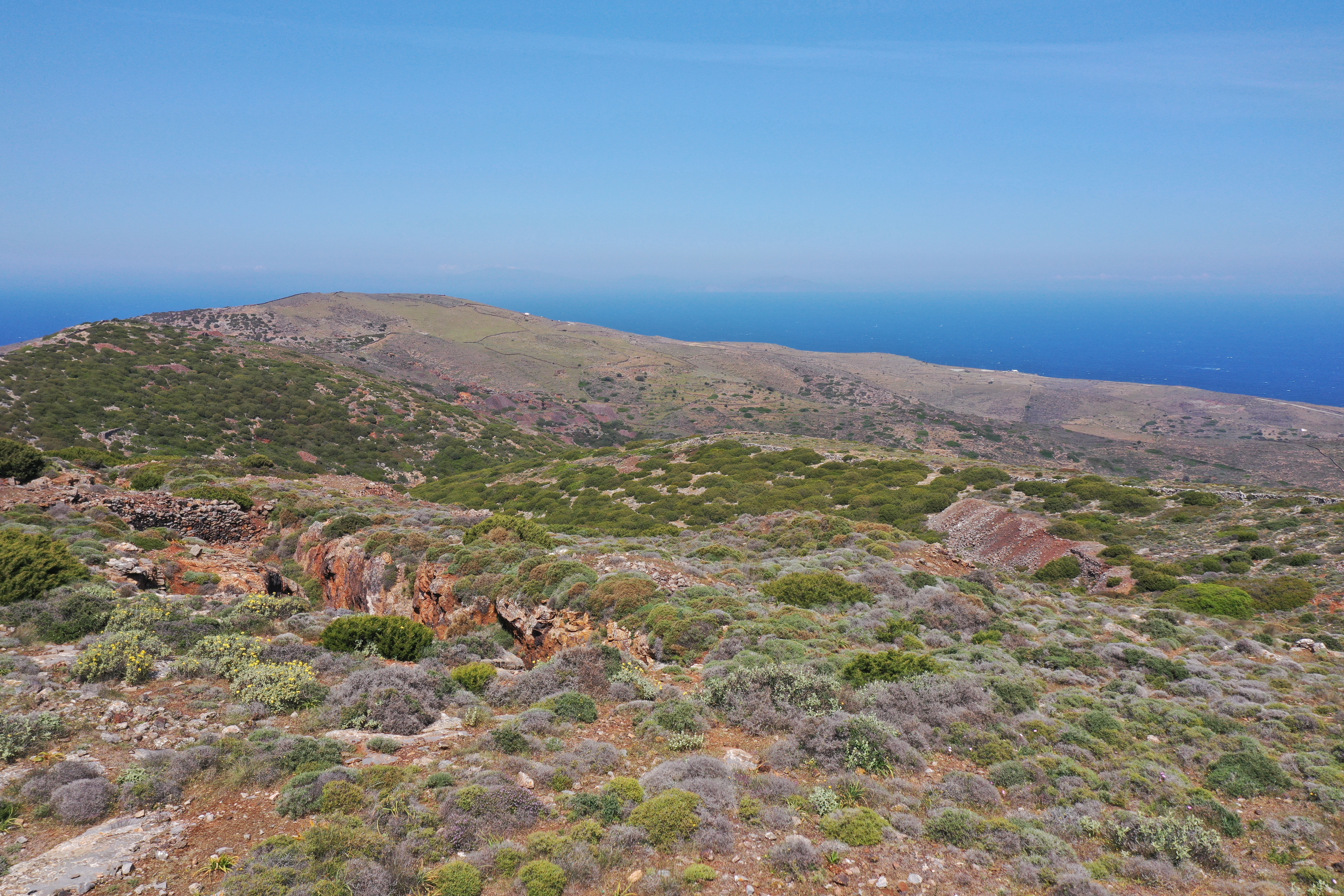

Highest point
- Elevation: 356 m (1,168 ft)

Geography
- Location: Kythnos

Kakovolo (Greek: Κακόβολο) is a mountain on the island of Kythnos in the Cyclades, in Greece. It is the highest point of the island.

== Description ==
Kakovolo is located on the northwestern side of Kythnos. Its summit stands at 356 meters and it is the highest point on the entire island. In the area of Kakovolo, installations dating back to the Early Cycladic period (Early Bronze Age) were discovered. The mountain has also been associated with the local lore of Kythnos including legends about fairies and other creatures.

There are abandoned mines in Kakovolo. In its time of prosperity, mining industry (mainly copper mines) attracted not only local workers but also economic migrants from other regions of Greece. After their extraction, the ores were loaded at the port of the nearby village of Loutra. The mines fell into decline and were abandoned during the 1940s. Nowadays hiking trails and routes exist in the area of Kakovolo.

== Bibliography ==
- Olga Hatzianastasiou, Σημειώσεις από την Κύθνο L. G. Mendoni - A. J. Mazarakis Ainian (ed.) Kea - Kythnos: history and archaeology: proceedings of an International Symposium Kea - Kythnos, 22-25 June 1994.
- Stelios Hiliadakis, Κύθνος, Εκδόσεις Μαθιουδάκη. Athens
- Giorgis Venetoulias, Του νησιού μου, Παραδόσεις της Κύθνου, En Plo, Athens 2018.
