= Portolan of Antonio Millo (1583) =

Nautical chart

- National Library of Poland
- Also known as: Geographicae tabulae in charta pergamena 1583
- Type: portolan chart
- Date: 1583
- Size: 41x65 cm (in a cover 44x33 cm)
- Accession: ZZK 0.2 399

Portolan of Antonio Millo is a portolan chart by Antonio Millo from 1583.

The portolan belonged to the library of the Zamoyski family. During the Warsaw Uprising Germans removed it to Austria. After the World War II it entered the collection of the National Library of Poland. From May 2024, the manuscript is presented at the permanent exhibition in the Palace of the Commonwealth.

The manuscript consists of eight artistically made portolano charts. The atlas covers the coasts of Western Europe, the Mediterranean Sea, the Black Sea, Central America and Africa. The last chart in the Atlas (Africa) carries the inscription Antonius Millo F. M. D. LXXXIII.

== Bibliography ==
- Makowski, Tomasz; Sapała, Patryk, eds. (2024). The Palace of the Commonwealth. Three times opened. Treasures from the National Library of Poland at the Palace of the Commonwealth. Warsaw: National Library of Poland.
- Tchórzewska-Kabata, Halina; Dąbrowski, Maciej, eds. (2003). More precious than gold. Treasures of the Polish National Library (electronic version) (PDF). Translated by Dorosz, Janina. Warsaw: National Library of Poland. ISBN 83-7009-402-3.
