= Kythnos =

Greek island in the Aegean Sea

Kythnos Κύθνος
- Municipality
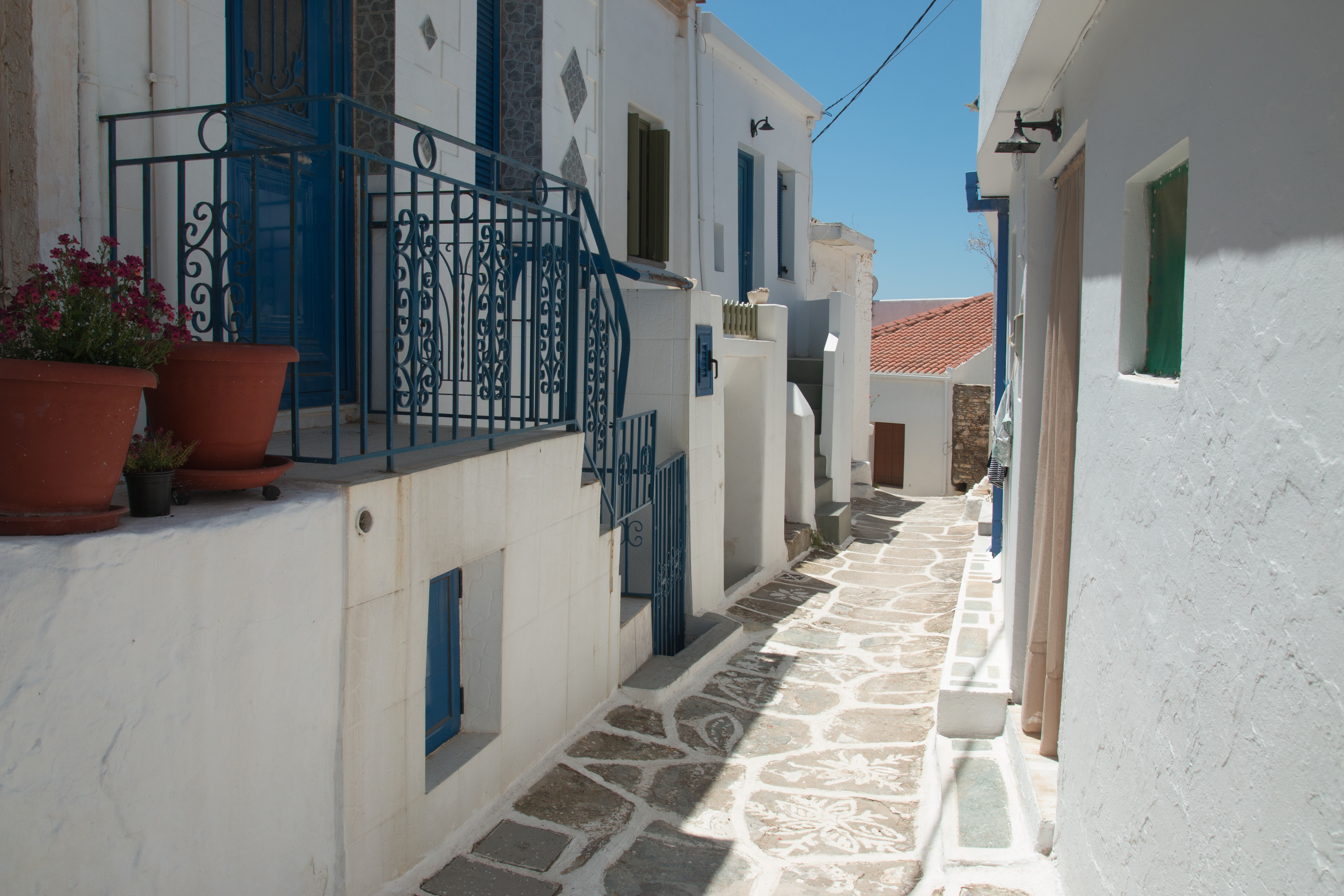
- Chora, Kythnos

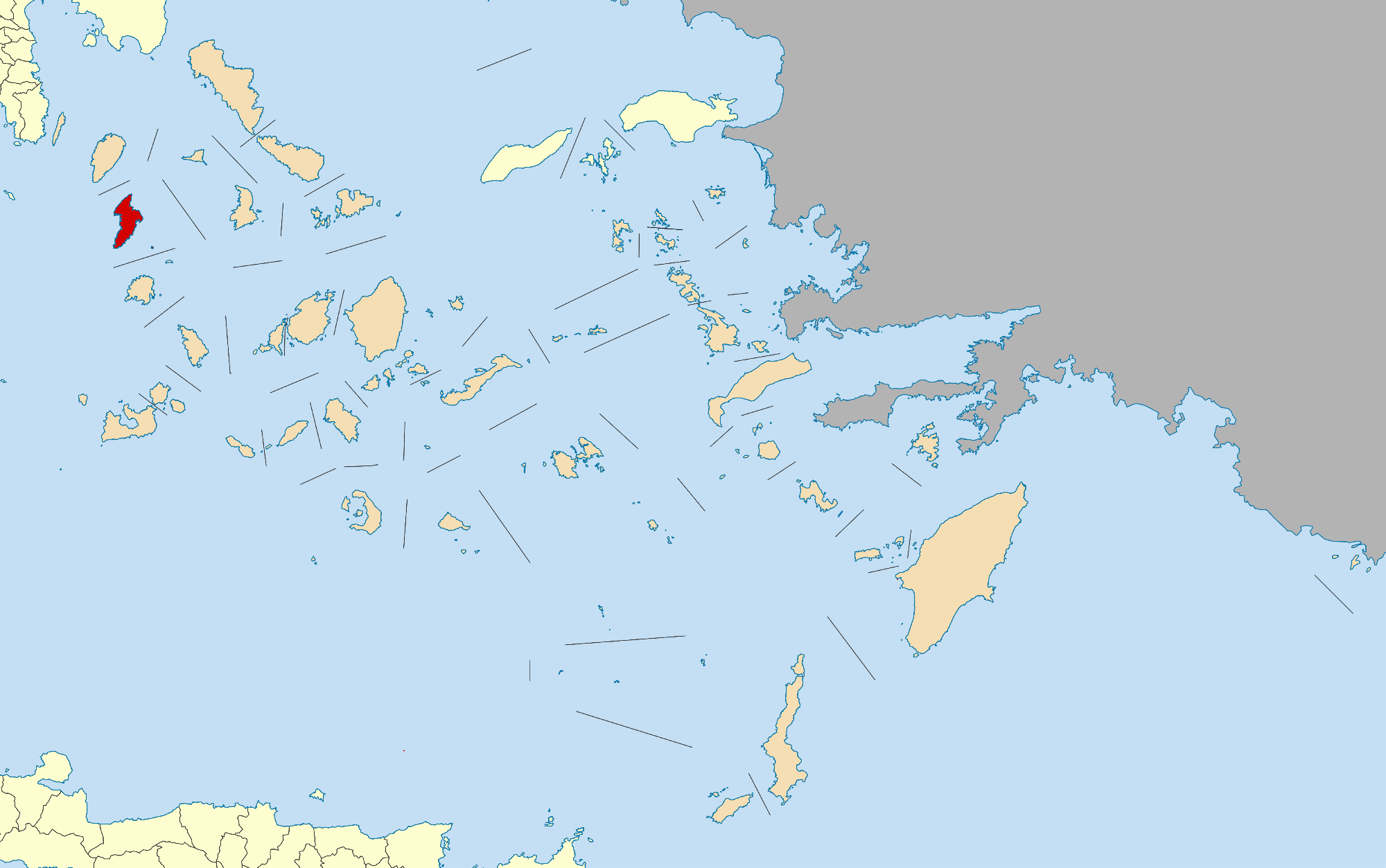

- Location within Greece
- Coordinates: 37°23′9″N 24°25′41″E
- Country: Greece
- Administrative region: South Aegean
- Regional unit: Kea-Kythnos
- Seat: Chora

Government
  - Mayor: Stamatis Garderis

Area
  - Municipality: 100.2 km^{2} (38.7 sq mi)
- Highest elevation: 297 m (974 ft)
- Lowest elevation: 0 m (0 ft)

Population (2021)
  - Municipality: 1,568
  - Density: 15.65/km^{2} (40.53/sq mi)
  - Community: 714
- Time zone: UTC+2 (EET)
  - Summer (DST): UTC+3 (EEST)
- Postal code: 840 06
- Area code: 22810
- Vehicle registration: ΕΜ
- Website: www.kythnos.gr

Kythnos (Greek: Κύθνος, pronounced [ˈkiθnos]), commonly called Thermia (Θερμιά), is a Greek island and municipality in the Western Cyclades between Kea and Serifos. It is 56 nautical miles (104 km) from the Athenian harbor of Piraeus. The municipality Kythnos is 100.187 km^{2} (38.68 sq mi) in area and has a coastline of about 100 km (62 mi). Mount Kakovolo is island's highest peak (365m).

== Settlements ==
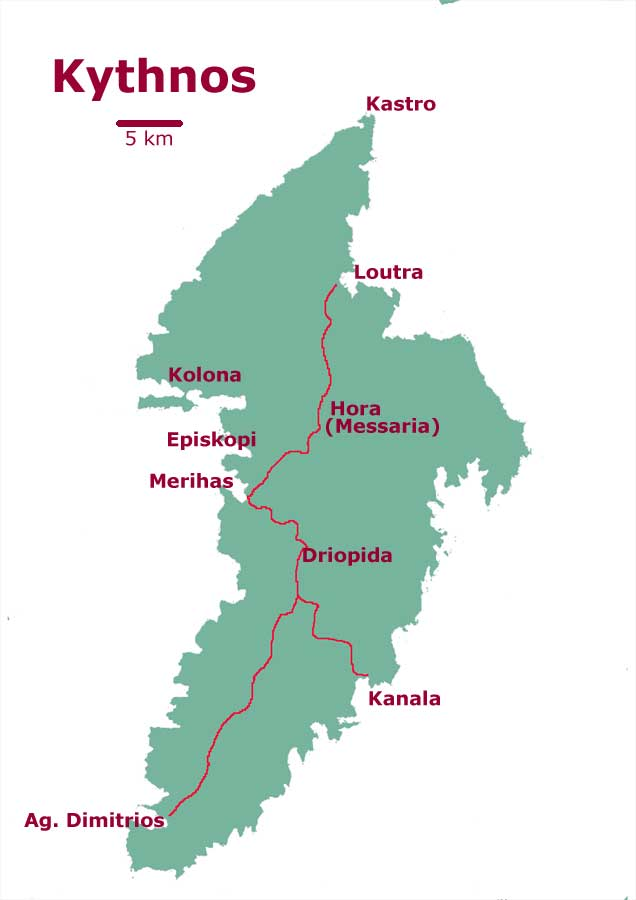

The island has two significant settlements, the village of Messaria or Chora of Kythnos (pop. 561 in 2011 census), known locally as Chora, and the village of Dryopis or Dryopida (pop. 325), also known as Chorio. Both villages are notable for their winding and often stepped streets, too narrow for vehicular traffic. The villages are very picturesque but have different architectural styles. Chora has the more-typical flat roofs of the Cyclades, while Dryopida's rooftops are slanted and tiled. Chora is also notable for its large Greek Orthodox Church.

There is also a growing coastal settlement called Kanala on the east side of the island with the homonymous Christian Orthodox shrine, and many of the larger beaches are settled by a handful of residents. Aghios Dimitrios, at the southern tip of the island, is a mostly modern settlement, with small vacation houses dotting the hillside above a wide beach that is dotted with sea daffodils. On the northeast end of the island lies Loutra (pop. 81), a village famous for its thermal springs, which are said to have curative properties. Although the large tourist hotel there has been closed for several years, the bathhouse is still functioning and visitors may soak in its marble tubs for a modest fee.

The port town is called Merichas (pop. 369), its population significantly fluctuating during the year. Before the 1970s, there were no year-round residents in recent history; a Greek fisherman named Manolas Psaras and his wife Foto were the first to live in the port year-round. Today, there is a growing year-round population, and, especially during the peak of the summer tourist season, the town becomes quite busy. Many residents of the port speak at least some English, the most popular second language. Merihas is connected to Piraeus and to Lavrion by ferry boat, and the ride takes one to four hours, depending on the speed of the ship and the weather. Construction of a new mole began in 2005 to accommodate larger ferryboats and was completed in 2008. Kythnos was until recently considered to be one of the last Cycladic islands unaffected by the impact of tourism, but this is inexorably changing. Still, the island has not yet been overdeveloped, and in the more remote areas of the villages, traditional ways live on relatively unchanged.

== Name ==
The first inhabitants of Kythnos were the Dryopes whose mythical king was Kythnos (son of the God Apollo), hence the name of the island. It was also known as Dryopis or Ofiousa. In the Middle Ages it was called Thiramna, while Nilos Doxapatris mentions it with the name Thermia as early as 1143, from the hot springs that exist. Later, the Turks called it "Hamam Antassi" ("island of warm waters").

== History ==
=== Pre-history ===
Kythnos can lay claim to one of the oldest known habitations in the Cycladic islands, a Mesolithic settlement (10000 BCE – 8000 BCE) at Maroulas on the northeast coast. The site, close to the village of Loutra, is situated on the shore, and large portions have eroded into the sea. Excavations in 1996 found intact human skeletons, along with stone artifacts and part of a floor pavement, which indicates a long-term settlement, probably of hunter-gatherers.

=== Pre-classical antiquity ===
Third millennium BCE (First Cycladic Period) findings at Skouries near the highest peak of the island, Mt. Profitis Elias, suggest that Kythnos was a supplier of raw materials for metallurgy to other islands during the Bronze Age. Remains of copper smelting sites and open-air copper mines were investigated in 1984–1985. (A recent paper by Myrto Georgakopoulo points to the seminal work here by Gale and others.)

The earliest inhabitants of the island known to historians were the Kares (Carians), an Anatolian people probably allied to or under the dominion of the Minoans, who eventually were forced by pressure of invading tribes to move on and settle in Asia Minor. Herodotus (Bk. viii, 73) records that in the 13th century BCE, another pre-Hellenic tribe, the Dryopes, originally from the Greek mainland near Mount Parnassus, migrated to the islands, first to Euboea and later spreading to Kea, Kythnos, and beyond. This tribe most probably gave rise to the name of one of the two main villages, Dryopis or Dryopida. Some sources say the island took its name from King Kythnos of the Dryopes; others suggest this is a mythical rather than a historical figure. (Speculations on the origin of the name are contained in Vallinda, 1896.) The Dryopes eventually moved on as well under pressure from Ionians, who migrated out of mainland Greece as Dorian tribes moved in from the north.

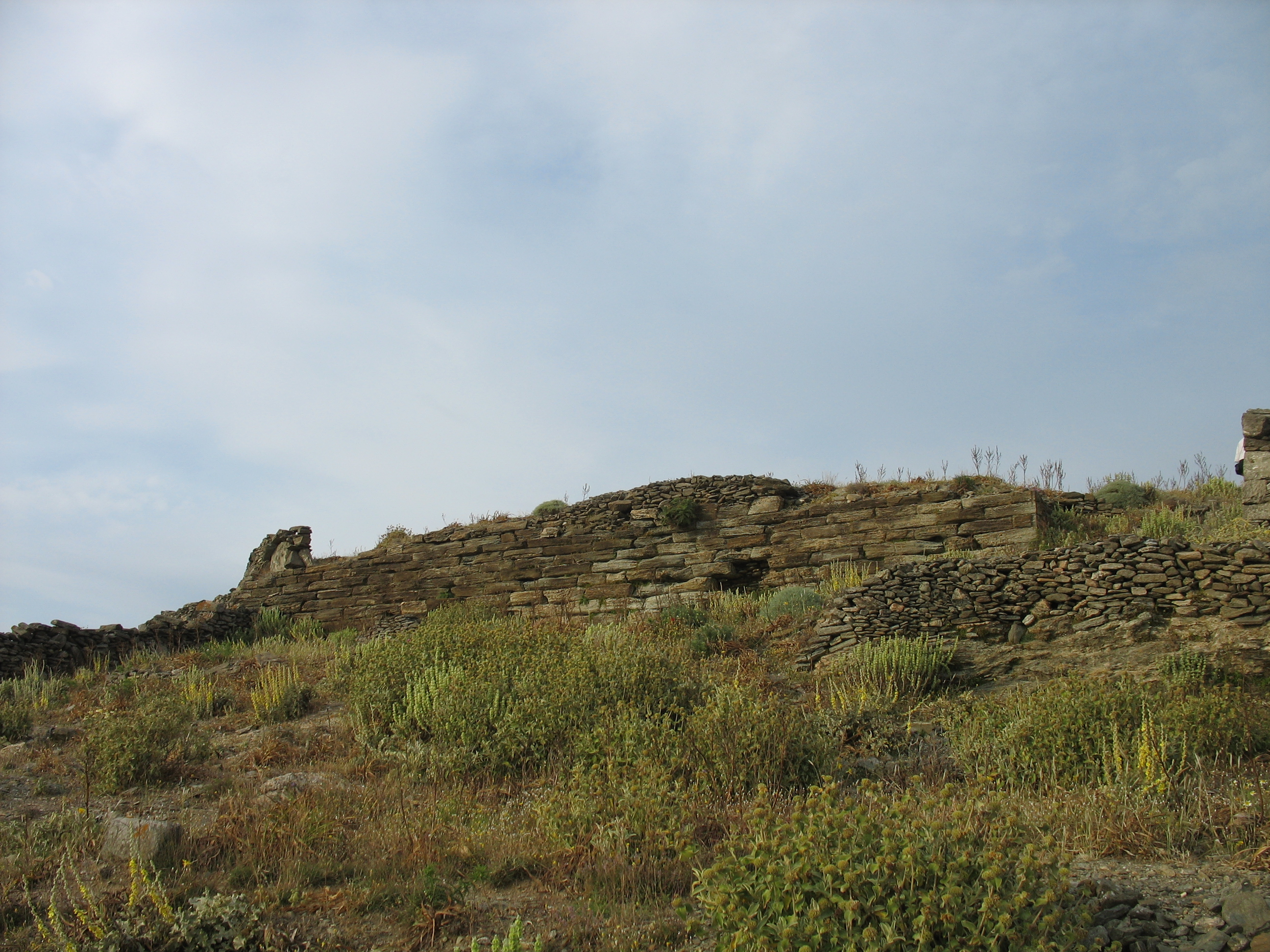
Ancient walls at Vryokastro

A Hellenistic site at Vryokastro, above the bay of Episkopi on the northwest part of the island, was partially excavated in the mid-20th century, yielding floor plans of houses and a sanctuary, as well as a few artifacts. In Greek newspaper articles of December 19, 2002, archaeologist Alexandros Mazarakis-Ainian announced a spectacular discovery on this site: an inner sanctum (adyton) of the temple was found intact and unplundered. Over 1,400 objects, including precious jewels and gold, silver and bronze artifacts, terracotta figurines, and painted vases, were excavated from what the archaeologists have determined is a 2,700-year-old temple dedicated to either Hera, queen of the gods, or Aphrodite, goddess of love. The artifacts date mostly from the 7th to the 5th centuries BCE. The site at Vryokastro was inhabited until Roman times. In this era, the islands of the Cyclades suffered frequent predation by pirates, and perhaps for this reason, the main settlements moved inland and to more defensible locations.

Remains of another old settlement, with extensive stone walls, can be seen in the extreme northern headland. This site, called Kastro (Greek for Castle), was likely the capital of the island from about the 1st century through the Byzantine era and into Frankish times. This site seems nearly impregnable: on three sides is a sheer 500-foot (150 m) drop to the sea. The fourth side is approached via a narrow track, which was barricaded with a thick, high wall, parts of which are still extant (along with walls delineating hundreds of houses). Nevertheless, there is evidence that the town was destroyed and rebuilt several times. The population fluctuated dramatically during this period and at times the island was decimated due to marauders and plague (Smith, 1854 and Bent, 1885, reprinted 2002).

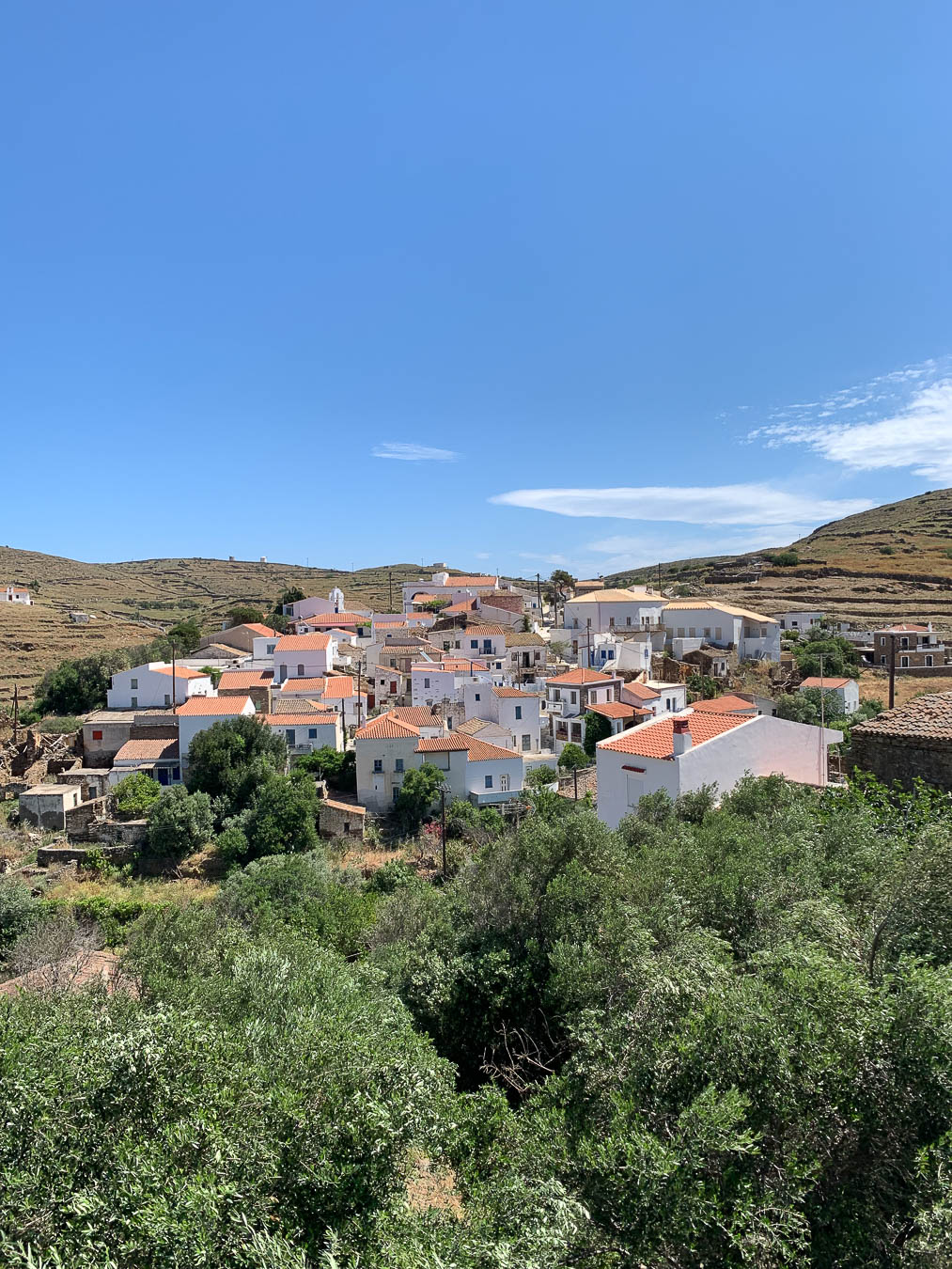
View of the village of Dryopida

=== Classical antiquity ===
Only rarely is the island mentioned by ancient authors. In the Battle of Salamis (480 BCE), Herodotus records that Kythnos contributed a trireme and a penteconter, and this contribution is commemorated on the base of a golden tripod at Delphi (Herodotus, Bk viii, 46).

Innumerable sources repeat, without providing a citation, that Aristotle praised the government of Kythnos in his "Constitution of Kythnos." Exactly what he wrote is difficult to ascertain, since all of his essays on the constitutions of 158 city-states are lost except for the one on Athens. (Possibly, the origin of the quote is from the 2nd century lexicographer Harpocration.)

In the Roman period Kythnos was a place of exile for important persons. In addition, in antiquity there were several temples on the island, which resulted in the island being visited by travelers from various regions (e.g. Egypt, Asia Minor, Italy, etc.). The painters Timanthis and Cydias were born in Kythnos in antiquity. Later Kythnos became part of the Byzantine Empire.

=== Crusader and Venetian Era ===
In 1207, Kythnos was annexed to the Frankish overlord Marco Sanudo's Aegean Duchy of the Archipelago (or of Naxos). During this period, it was known as Thermia, a name derived from the hot mineral springs occurring on the northeastern coast at the village of Loutra (which means "baths" in Greek). These medicinal baths were renowned at least since Roman times and were a fashionable spa and resort area.

The island was ruled as an appanage of the Duchy of the Archipelago from the 16th century until the fall of the Duchy, where it became de facto independent.

In 1600, Thermia also became the new name of a Latin bishopric on the Cyclades, formerly known as Roman Catholic Diocese of Ceo (now a Latin Catholic titular see).

The island capital remained at Kastro of Oria or Katakefalo, which was rebuilt as a Frankish fortress and was known as the Tower of Thermia (Bent, 1885, reprinted 2002).

After a period of depopulation in the early 15th century some Albanian communities moved from nearby Euboea. They were assimilated into the local Greek population.

=== Ottoman Era ===
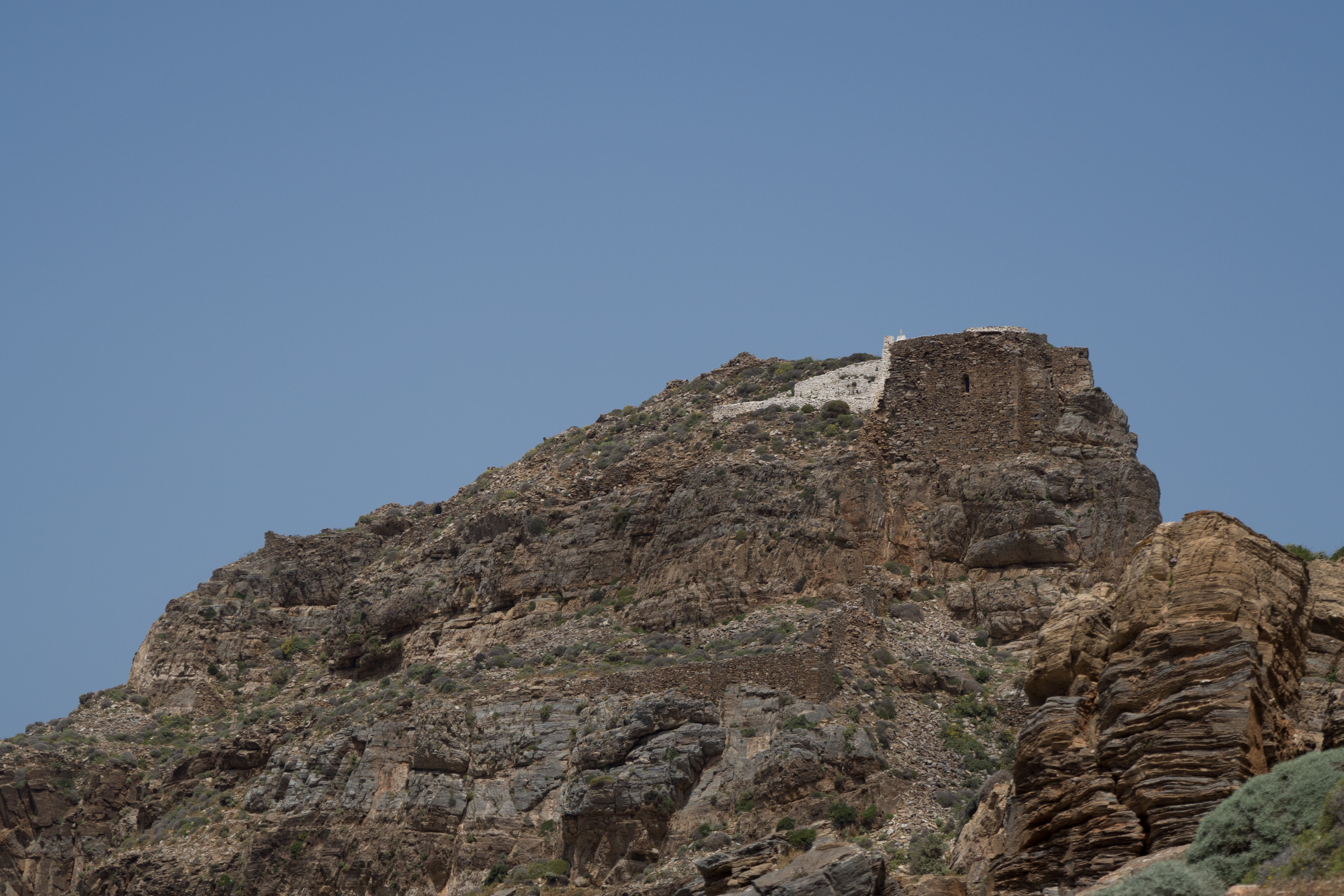
Oria or Katakefalo Castle

Following a siege, the Turks were victorious over the last Venetian overlord, Angelo III Gozzadini, in 1617. According to a myth recounted by Theodore Bent in his 1885 travelogue on the Cyclades, Kastro fell only because of a treacherous ploy by the Turks: a young woman, heavy with child and apparently in pain, approached the entrance and begged to be admitted; the watchman's daughter opened the gate for her—and for the Turks hiding nearby. Bent writes that this version is preserved in a popular island ballad.

After its fall to the Turks, Kastro was abandoned and the new capital was located inland, as the name Messaria suggests. Later, this town became known as Hora (the generic Greek name for a capital town, also spelled Chora). During this period Kythnos was a poor, under-populated place, still beset by pirates and suffering frequent epidemics.

In 1791 a Greek school was opened in Chora (Messaria), which was housed in the monastery of Panagia of Nikous. The monk Parthenios Koulouris from Sifnos initially taught there. He was succeeded in 1809 by the monk Makarios Filippaios from Kythnos, who continued teaching during the years of Ioannis Kapodistrias.

In 1806 a pirate raid, although repelled, resulted in groups of locals emigrating to the coast of Asia Minor, from where some later repatriated, bringing back customs to the island from the places where they had lived.

Kythnos took part in the 1821 Revolution and during its duration was a safe haven for Greek refugees from areas such as Chios, Psara and Aivali. In 1823 a plague broke out. Kythnos was represented in the 3rd National Assembly of Epidaurus, in the 3rd National Assembly of Troizina by Moschos Filippaios (Chora) and N. Economidis Levantis (Dryopida). In the following years until 1832 Kythnos was represented in the National Assemblies by N. Vallindas.

=== Modern Kythnos ===
In 1828 five schools were operating on the island, including private schools, and by 1833 there were only two schools operating. They were financially supported by contributions from the residents and income from monasteries on the island. During the reign of King Othon, Kythnos was a place of exile for political prisoners and was the scene of an unsuccessful revolt in 1862 by rebels from Syros who attempted to free the prisoners.

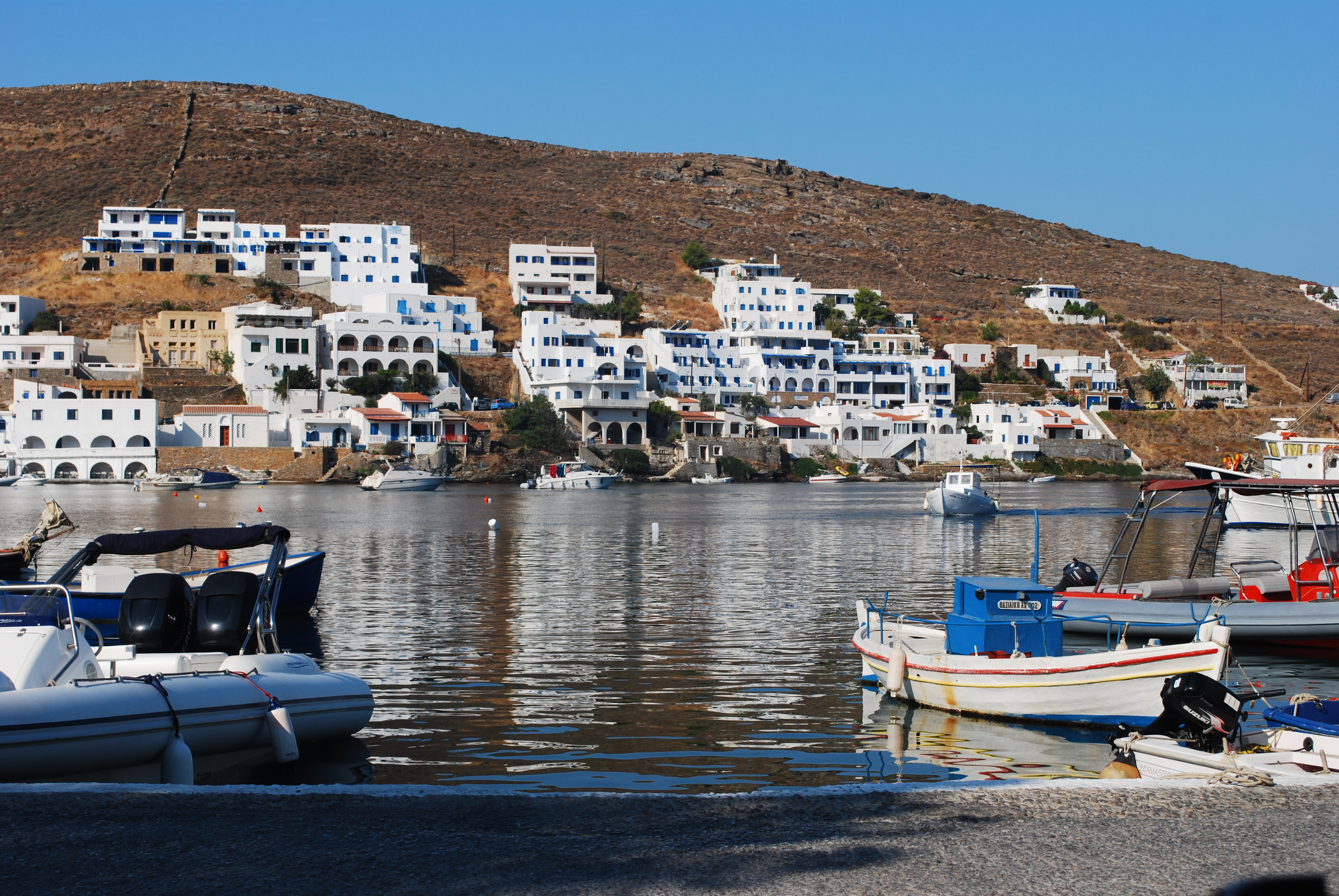
View of Merichas

In the 19th century, Kythnians mainly earned their living as they had for centuries before: as shepherds or by fishing. The island had few natural resources and, lacking a deep-water mooring for boats, was relatively inaccessible. On the other hand ceramics and pottery flourished in Kythnos, with Kythnian craftsmen leaving for Athens in the summers and returning in the winter.

At the beginning of the 20th century the production of high quality barley and semolina increased greatly and exports increased accordingly. As the new century dawned, iron ore was discovered on the island and Kythnians were able to supplement their meager incomes by working in the mines. These mines, however, were mostly played out by World War II, and once again, the population of the island went into decline, as young people left to find employment and a better life in Athens or even further afield. During the Axis Occupation of Greece, many Kythnians living in Athens returned to the island for better living conditions.

The Greek tourist boom beginning in the mid-20th century largely bypassed Kythnos because its harbor lacked a deep-water dock for ferryboats. The construction of a new mole in 1974 precipitated great changes. Today, the island is a modern, prosperous place, with a burgeoning tourist trade. It is in the forefront of alternative energy experiments, with the establishment in 1982 of Greece's first wind park. With the addition of a photovoltaic system and storage batteries, the amount of diesel fuel required to supply the island's electricity has been reduced by 11%. Numerous individual houses on remote coves are equipped with photovoltaic systems, and nearly all houses employ solar water heaters.

Due to its proximity to Athens, Kythnos has become a fashionable setting for vacation homes, in addition to being an accessible destination for foreign visitors. Besides its numerous beaches and picturesque villages, it also is the site of one of the largest caves in Greece, Katafyki Cave in Dryopida. This cave, first visited in the 1830s and described by the geologist Fiedler, has unique "schratten" or rock curtains, as well as speleotherms. It was the site of an iron mine until 1939 and has now been developed as a tourist attraction.

In 2023, Kythnos celebrated the inauguration of the Archaeological Museum of Kythnos, a long-awaited dream for the island's inhabitants. It is housed in the old, Single Classroom Primary School of Chora, Kythnos, and along its exhibits visitors may find an Archaic temple treasure with various golden and precious metals offerings, plus 7th to early 5th century BC objects.

== Folklore ==
=== Swings ===
Swings or Kounies (Greek: Κούνιες) is an Easter custom that has been preserved to this day. A wooden swing is tied to a tree or to stakes in the centre of the village and young men and women swing on it, exchanging praise and poetry.

=== May Day ===
On the eve of the first of May they would prepare the "May" wreath with flowers and sing to music. This is a custom that is still preserved today.

=== Lazanis ===
At noon on the Tyrian Sunday, the "Lazanis", a straw puppet who supposedly came to "take the lasagna (spaghetti)", would be baptized. The custom is still maintained to this day, with 'Lazanis' occupying the role of King Carnival.

=== Music and dance tradition ===
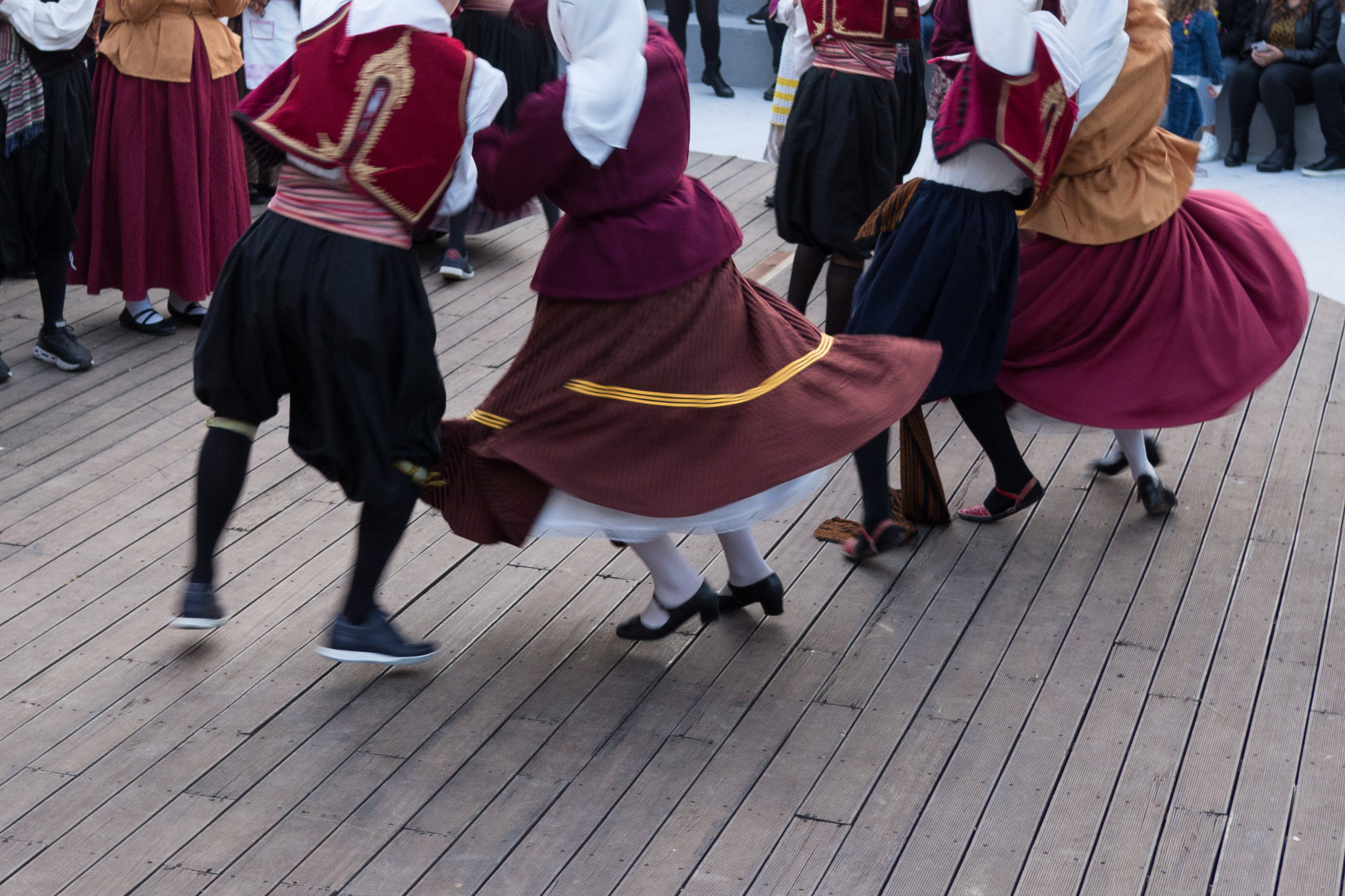
Dancers performing Balos.

The violin and the lute are the main musical instruments of the island, which form the "Zyas", as they are called on the island. The tsampouna (or kaida) is the characteristic instrument heard on Carnival.

=== Traditions ===
In the legends and beliefs of Kythnos there are multiple references to fairies, vampires, dragons etc. living in various places on the island such as: ancient ruins, mills, threshing floors, isolated beaches etc.

=== Gastronomy ===
Representative dishes of the local cuisine are sfougata (fried cheese balls), kolopi (pita with greens) and poulos (a bread roll filled with salted pork). The island also has other traditional products such as honey and various types of cheese.

== Beaches ==
Kythnos has more than 90 beaches, many of which are still inaccessible by road. Of particular note is the crescent-shaped isthmus of fine sand at Kolona. Other beaches are: Episkopi, Apokrousi, Megali Ammos, Schinari, Simousi, Martinakia, Zogaki, Naoussa, Kouri, Agios Stefanos, Vasilika, Lefkes & Liotrivi.

== Notable people ==
- Timanthes (4th century BC), painter
- Ignatius of Mariupol (1716–1786), bishop, founder of Mariupol
- Giorgos Zambetas 1925–1992, composer
- Leonidas Paraskevopoulos, military officer
- Giannoulis Larentzakis, basketball player

== In popular culture ==
- Clive Barker's story Babel's Children is set in Kythnos.

== Gallery ==
Throughout Kythnos, drylaid stone walls delineate individual parcels of land

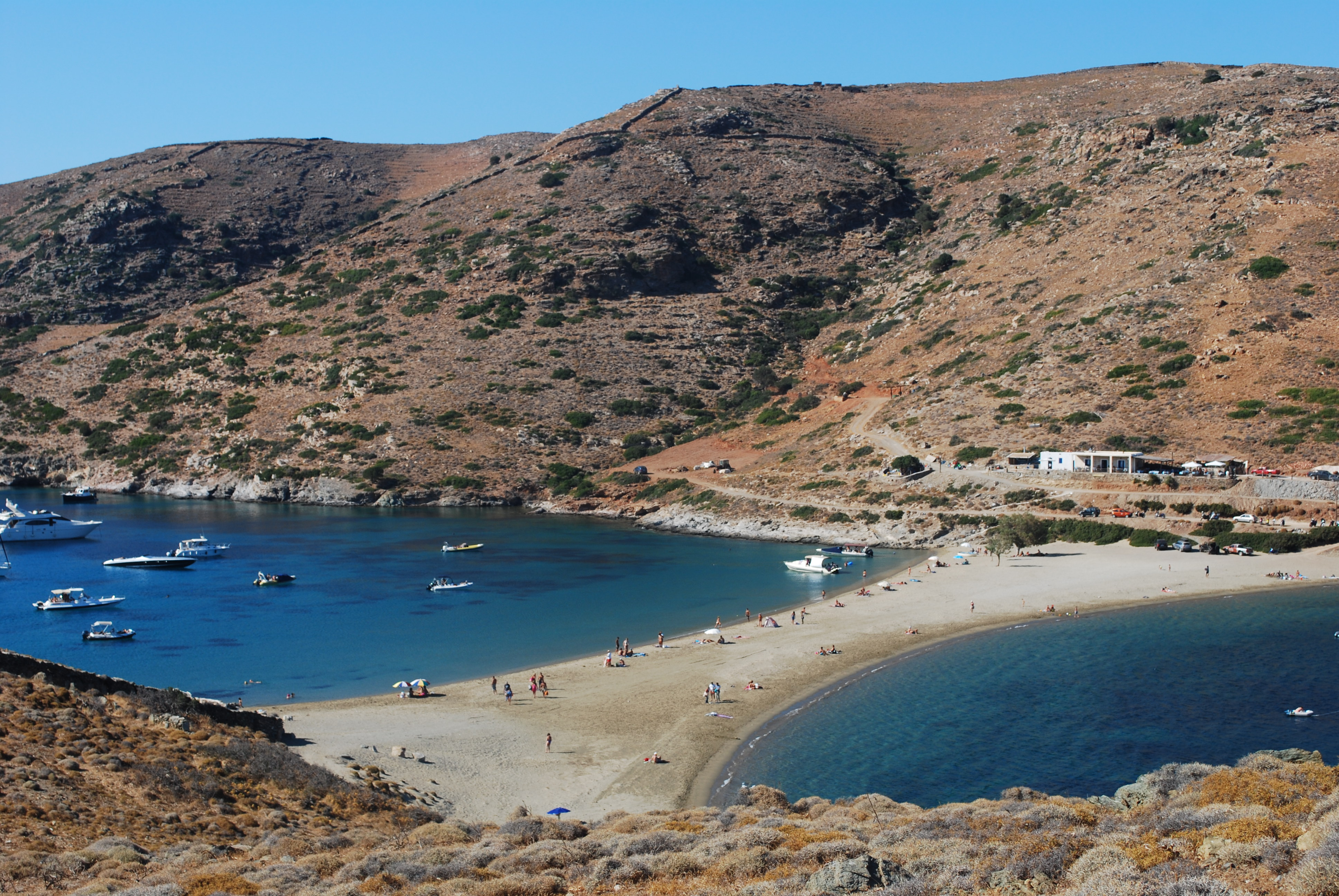
Kolona Beach

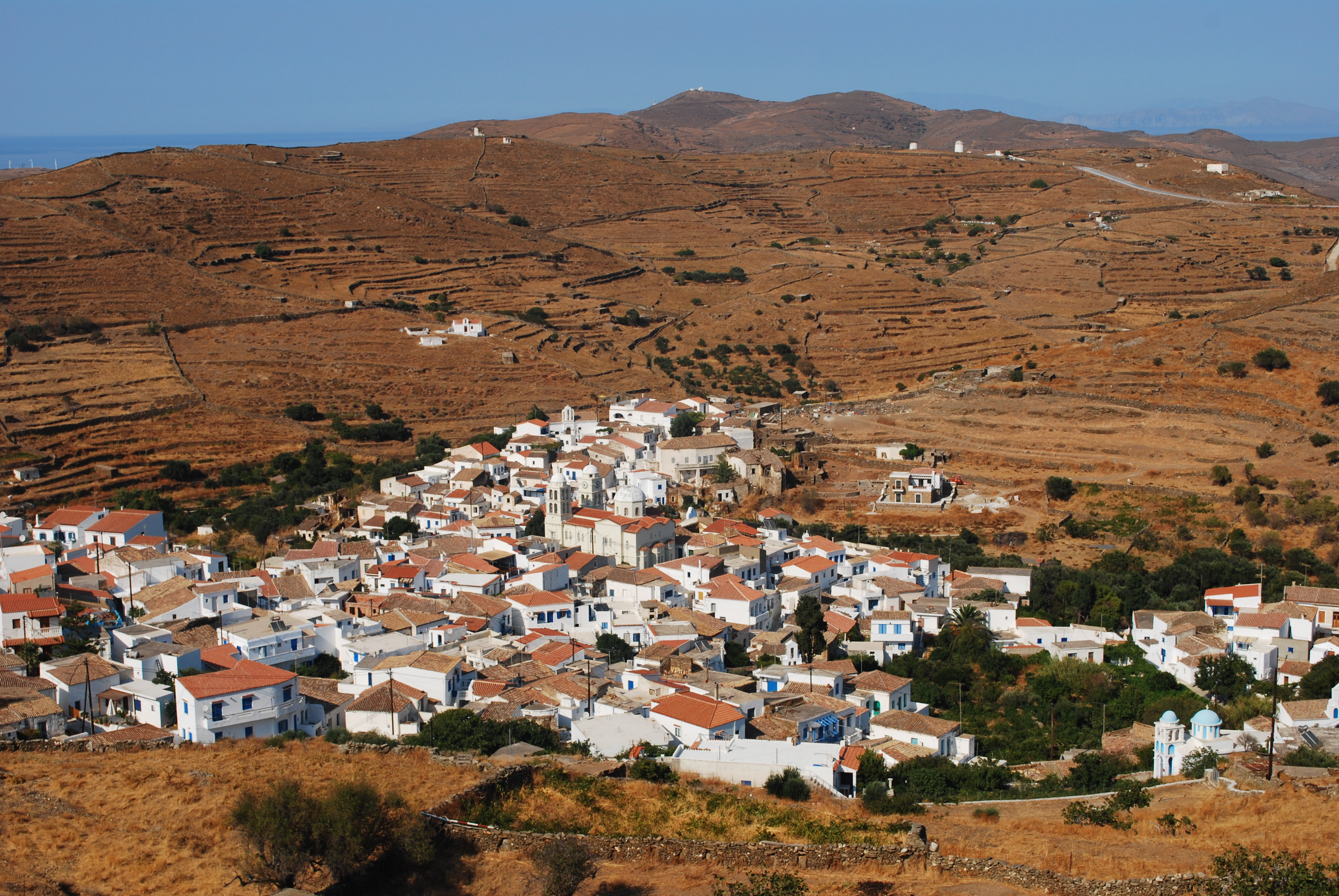
Dryopida village, Kythnos

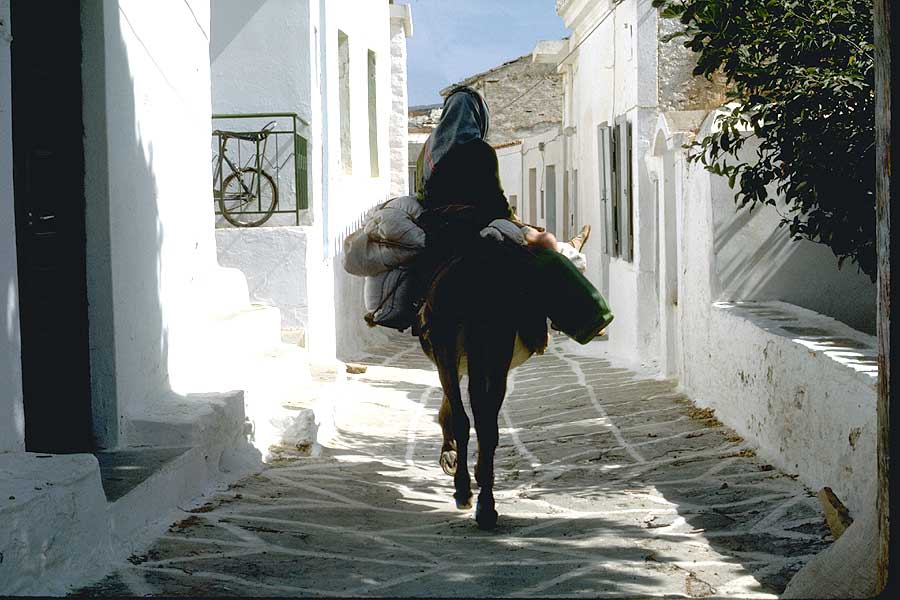
Typical alley in Dryopida

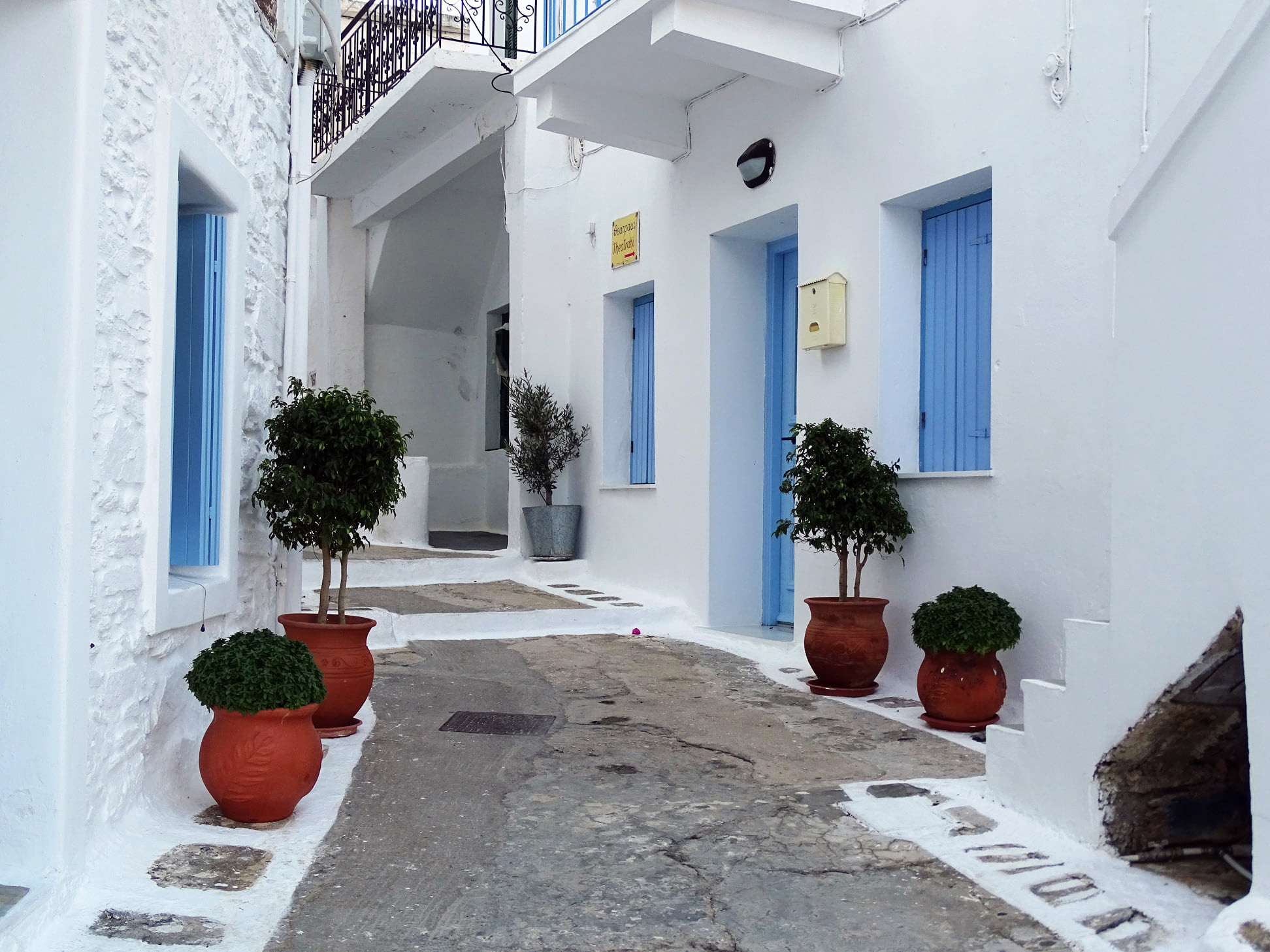
Dryopida

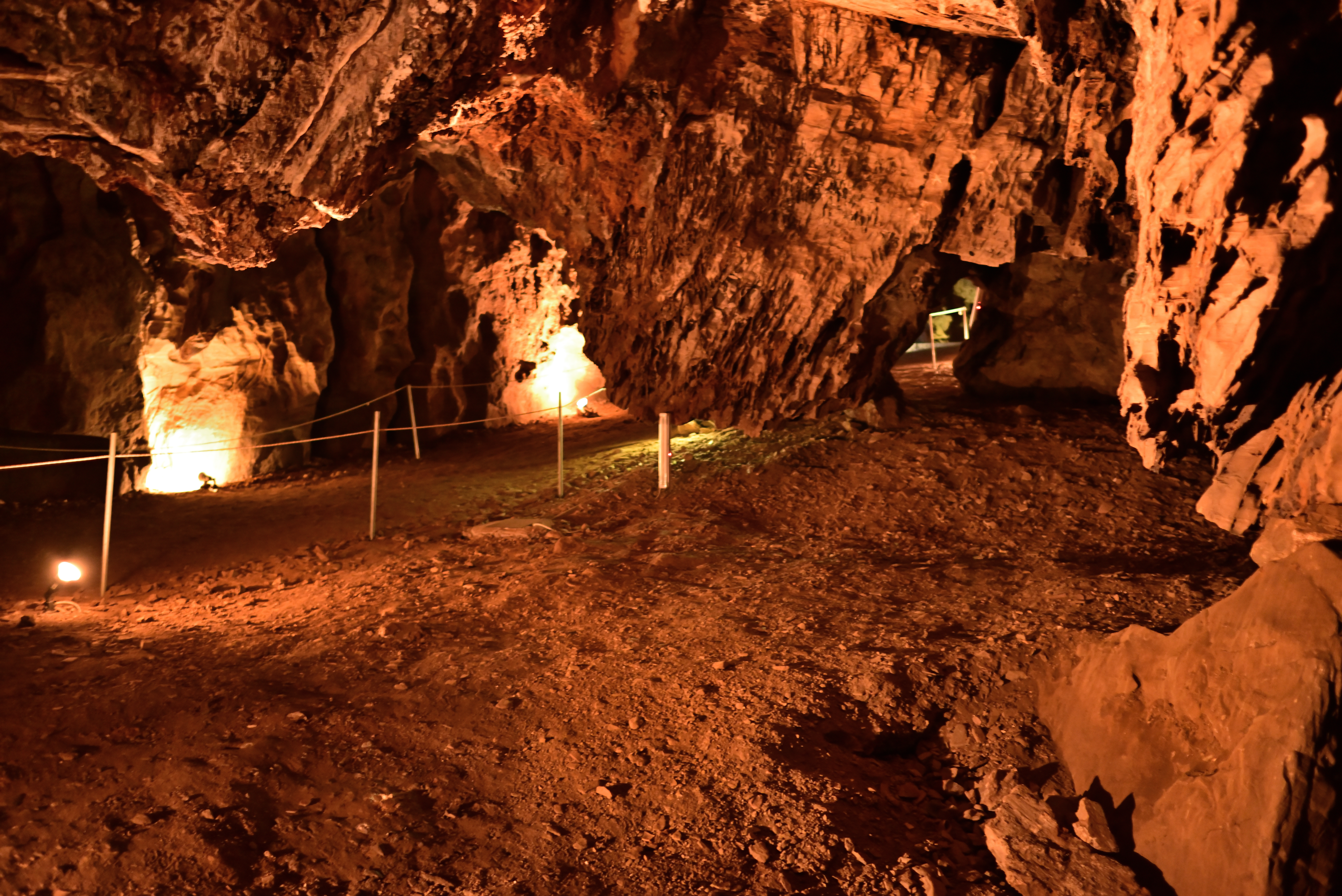
Katafiki, Dryopida

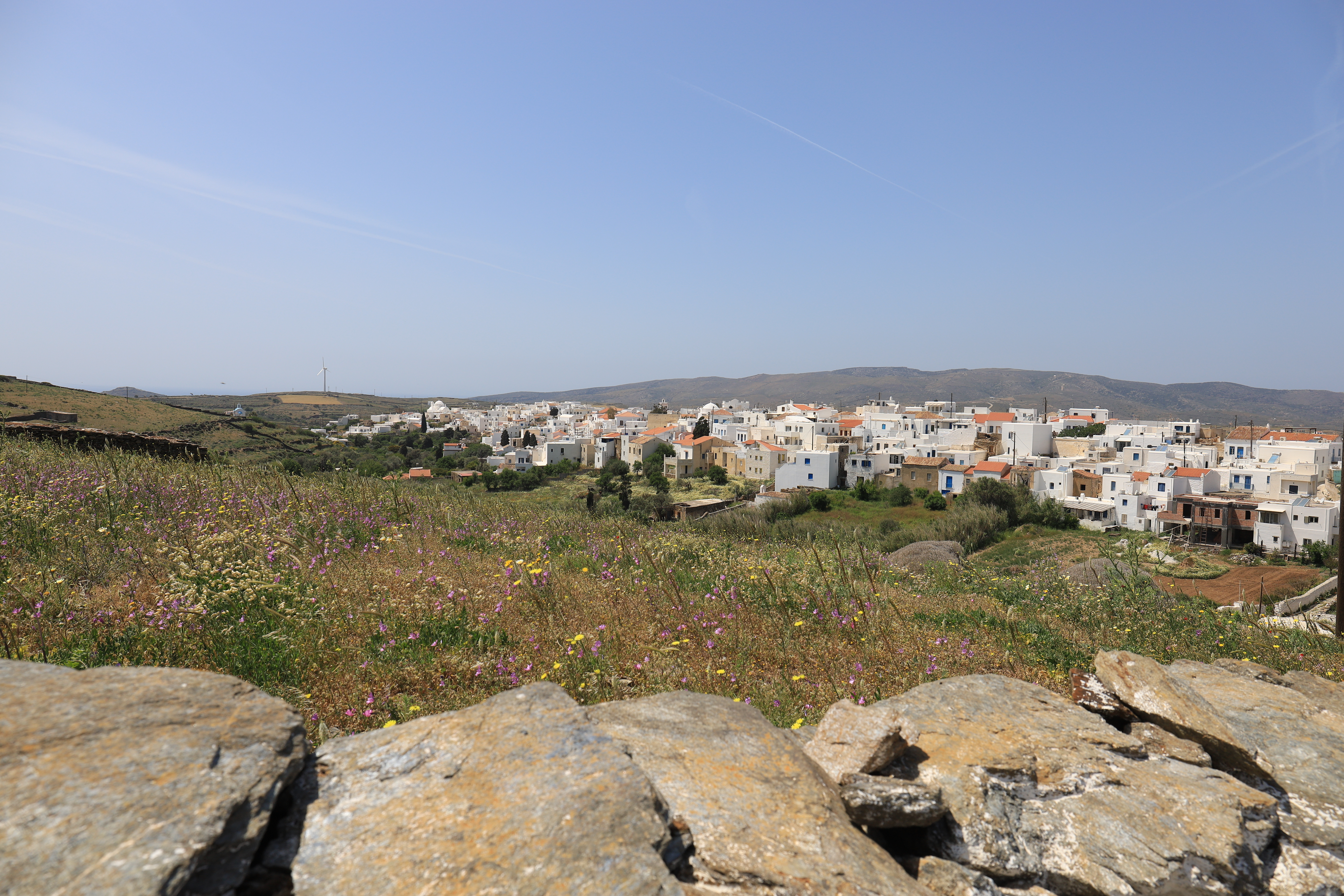
View of Chora, Kythnos

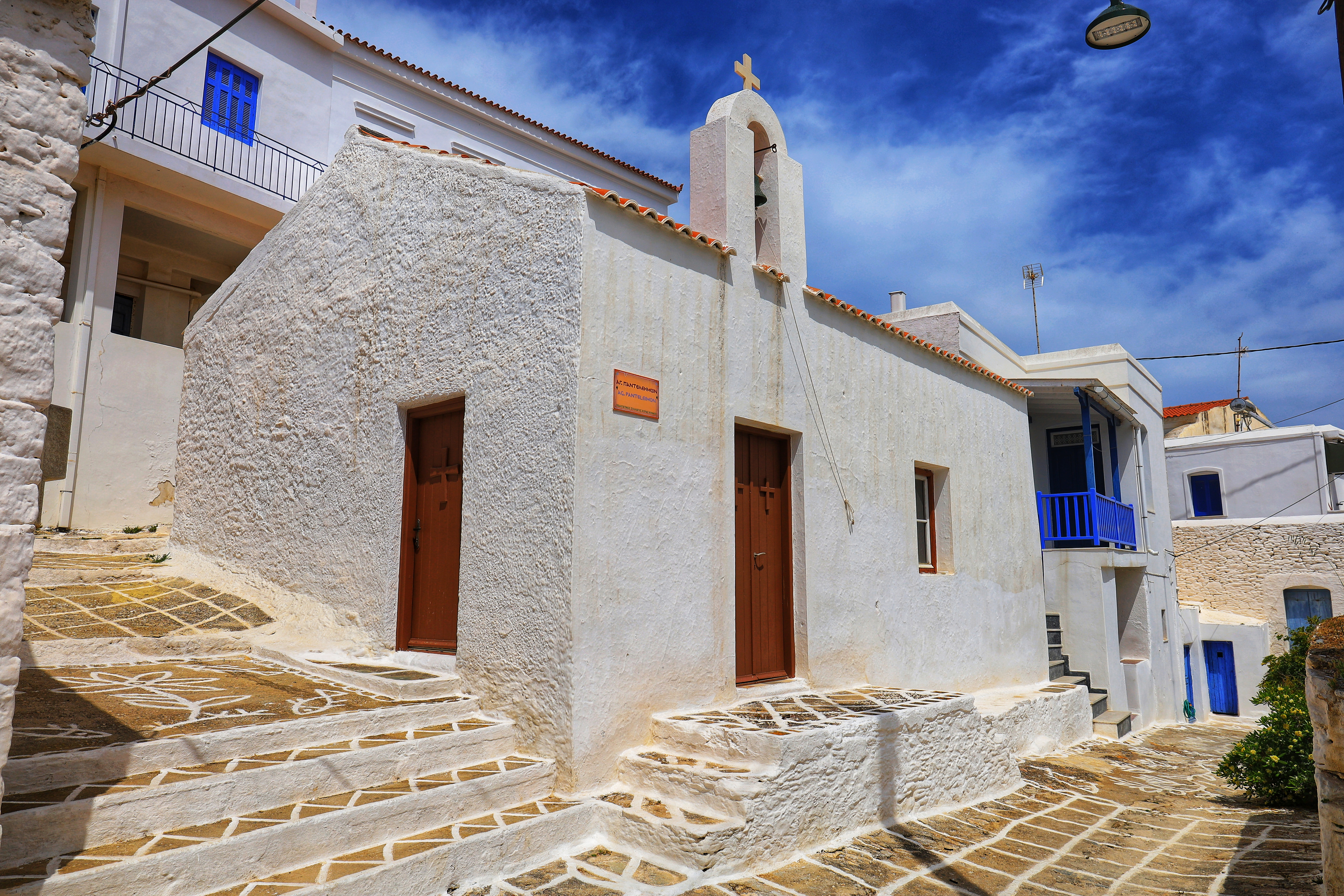
Agios Panteleimon, Chora

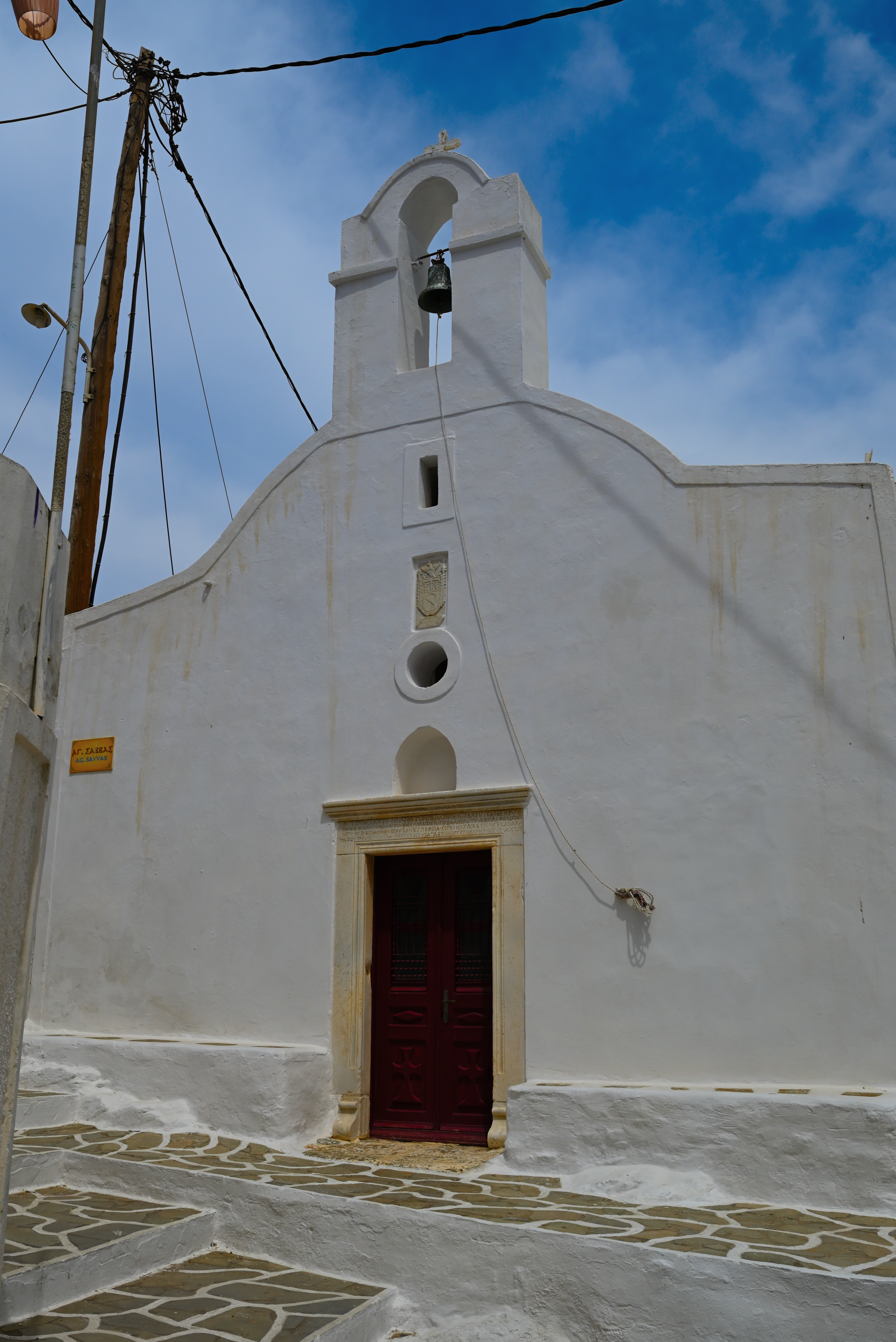
Church of Agios Savvas in Chora.

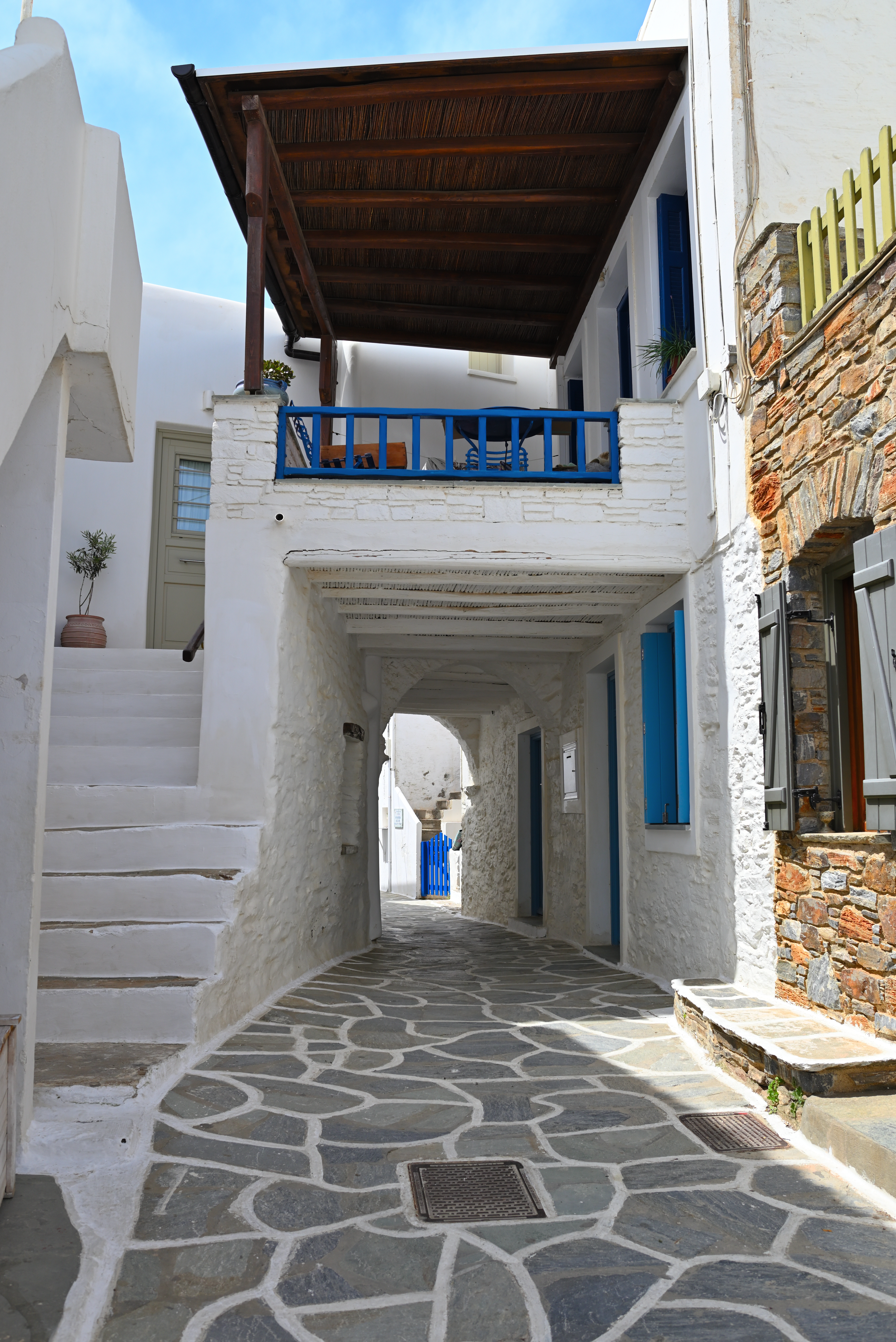
Alley in Chora

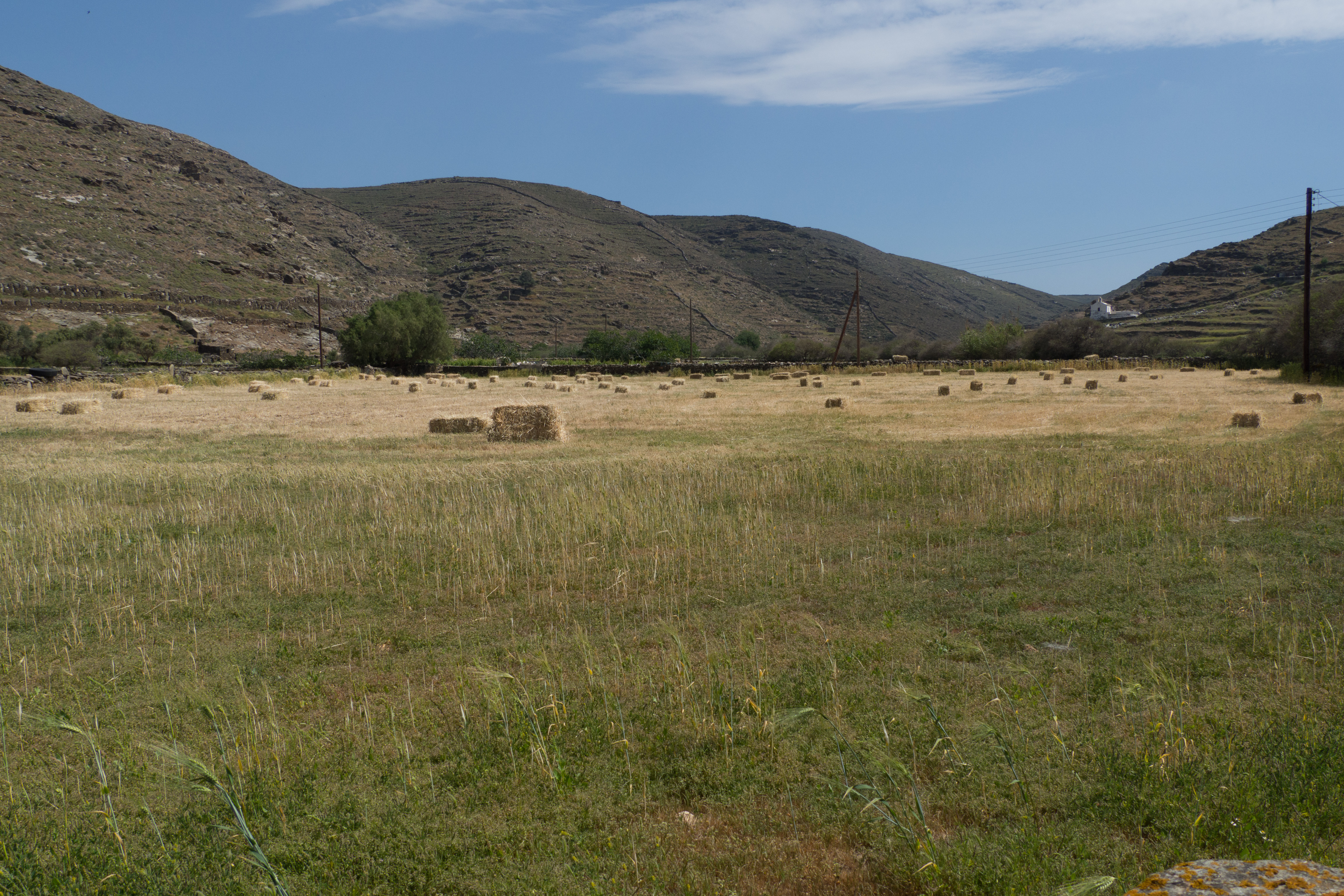
Landscape

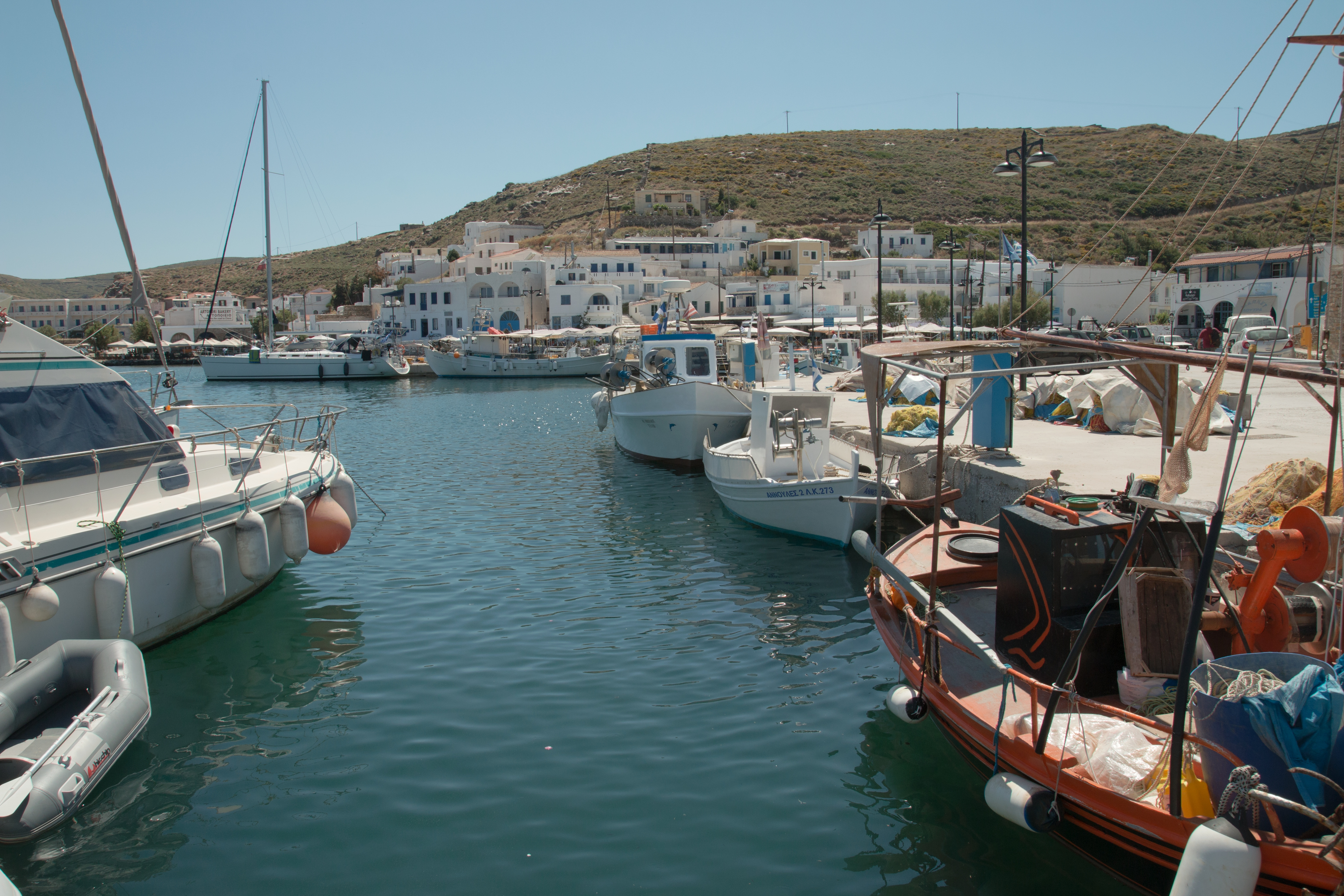
Loutra

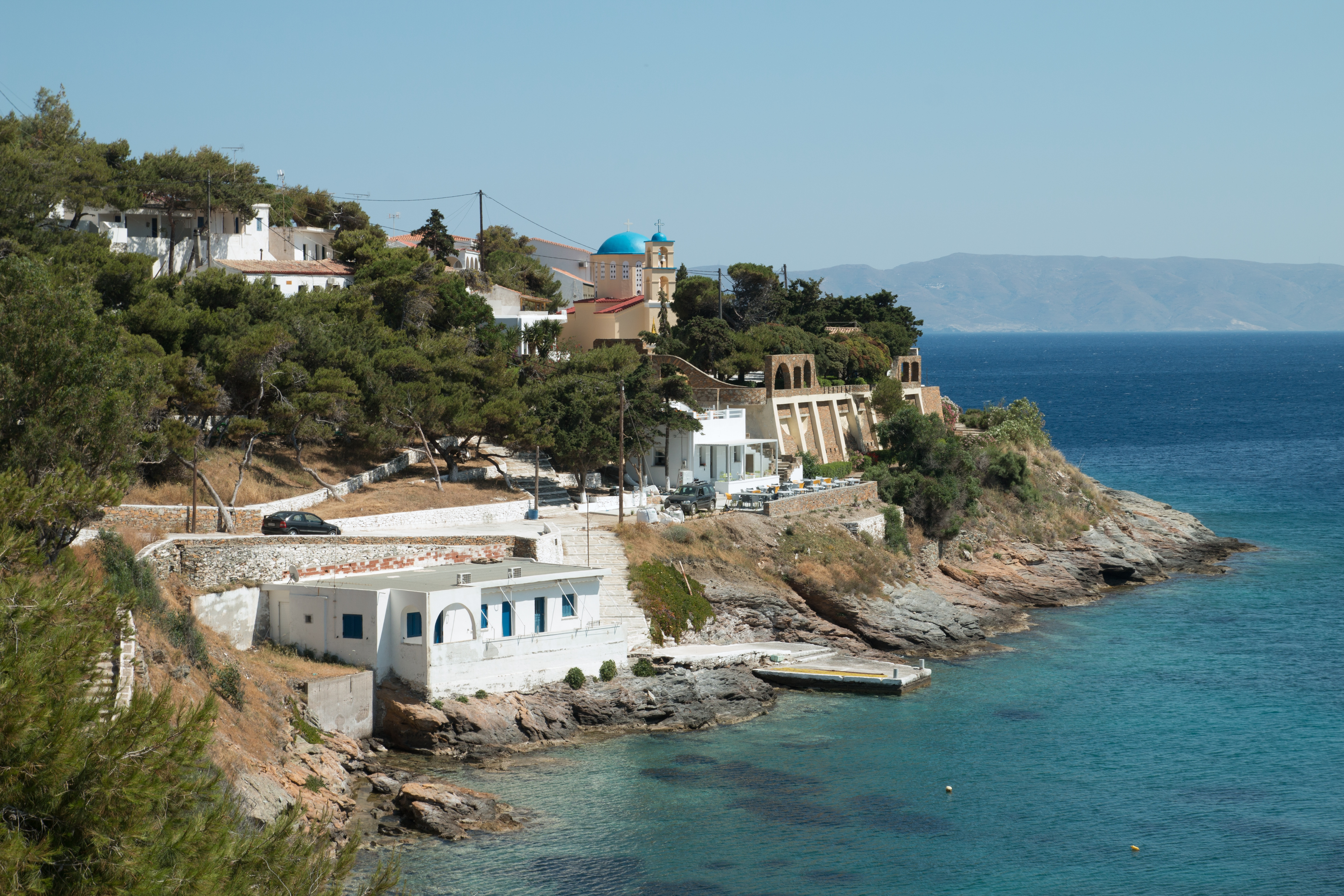
Kanala

Agios Dimitrios

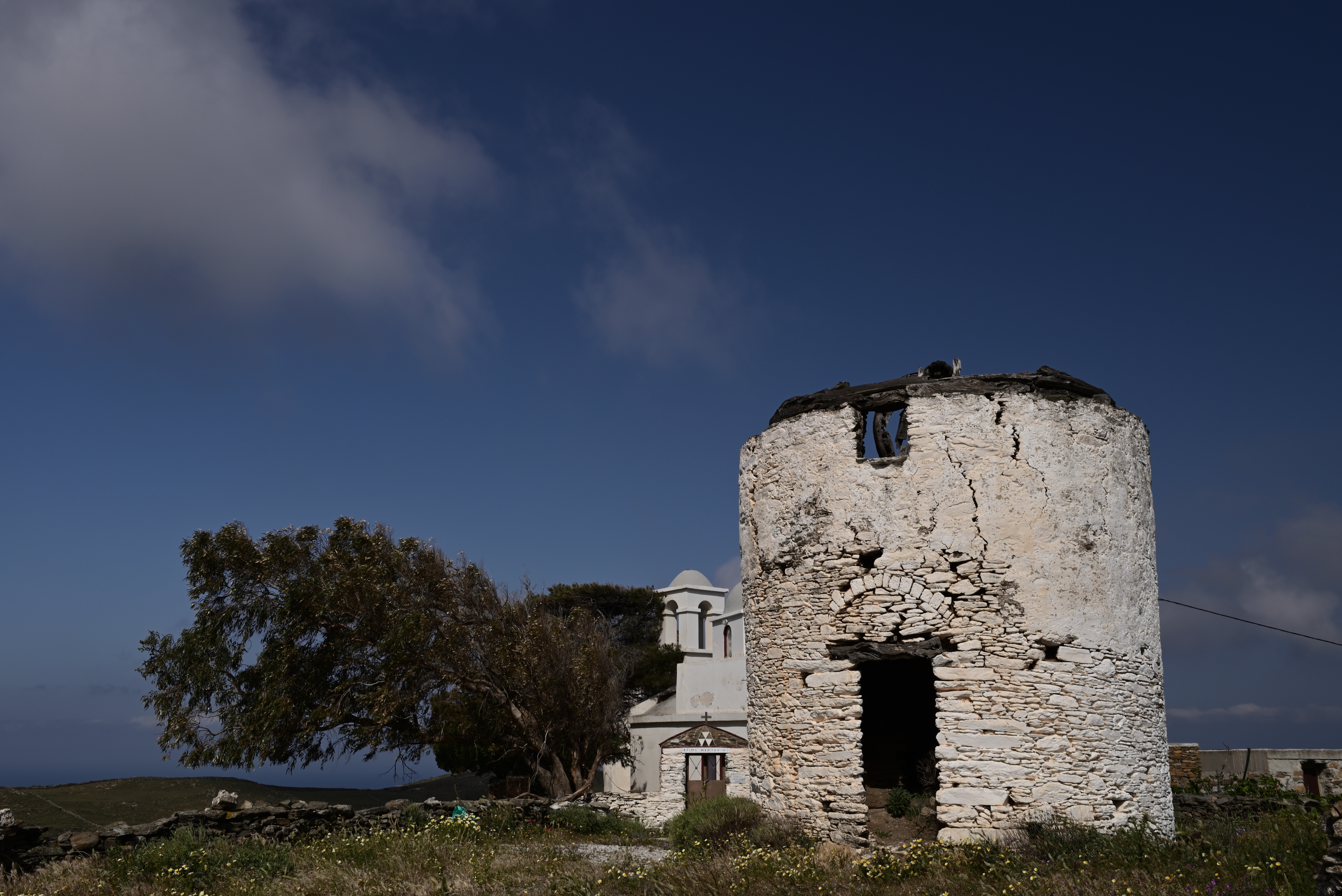
A ruined mill & Agios Nektarios church

== Sources ==
- Bent, James Theodore, "The Cyclades: Life Among the Insular Greeks," 1885, reprinted in 2002 by Archaeopress, Oxford. Chapter 17 recounts his impressions of Kythnos
- Freely, John (2006). The Cyclades : discovering the Greek islands of the Aegean. London: I.B. Tauris. ISBN 1-4294-1495-2. OCLC 76938088.
- Herodotus, "The History," translated by David Greene, Chicago: University of Chicago Press, paperback edition, 1988
- Smith, William, ed., "Dictionary of Greek and Roman Geography," 1854. Can be accessed at the Perseus Project.
- Vallinda, Antoniou, "History of the Island of Kythnos," monograph (in Greek), 1896, reprinted by the Syndesmos Kythnion, Athens, 1990.
- Βάλληνδα, Αντωνίου (1882). Κυθνιακά ήτοι της νήσου Κύθνου χωρογραφία και ιστορία μετά του βίου των συγχρόνων Κυθνίων εν ω ήθη και έθη και γλώσσα και γένη κλπ. Εν Ερμουπόλει: Τυπ. της "Προόδου".
- Βάλληνδα, Αντωνίου (1896). Ιστορία της νήσου Κύθνου . Αθήνα.
- Κορδατζή-Πρασσά, Αναστασία (1996-01-01). Η ΕΚΠΑΙΔΕΥΣΗ ΣΤΙΣ ΚΥΚΛΑΔΕΣ ΚΑΤΑ ΤΗΝ ΚΑΠΟΔΙΣΤΡΙΑΚΗ ΠΕΡΙΟΔΟ (1828-1832). Εθνικό και Καποδιστριακό Πανεπιστήμιο Αθηνών (ΕΚΠΑ), Σχολή Φιλοσοφική, Τμήμα Ιστορίας και Αρχαιολογίας. doi:10.12681/eadd/7433.
- Χρυσού-Καρατζά, Κυριακή (2006). Τροφή και διατροφή στις Κυκλάδες (19ος-20ος αι.). Εθνικό και Καποδιστριακό Πανεπιστήμιο Αθηνών (ΕΚΠΑ). Σχολή Φιλοσοφική. Τμήμα Φιλολογίας. Τομέας Βυζαντινής Φιλολογίας και Λαογραφίας. doi:10.12681/eadd/21852.
