= Balos (Greek dance) =

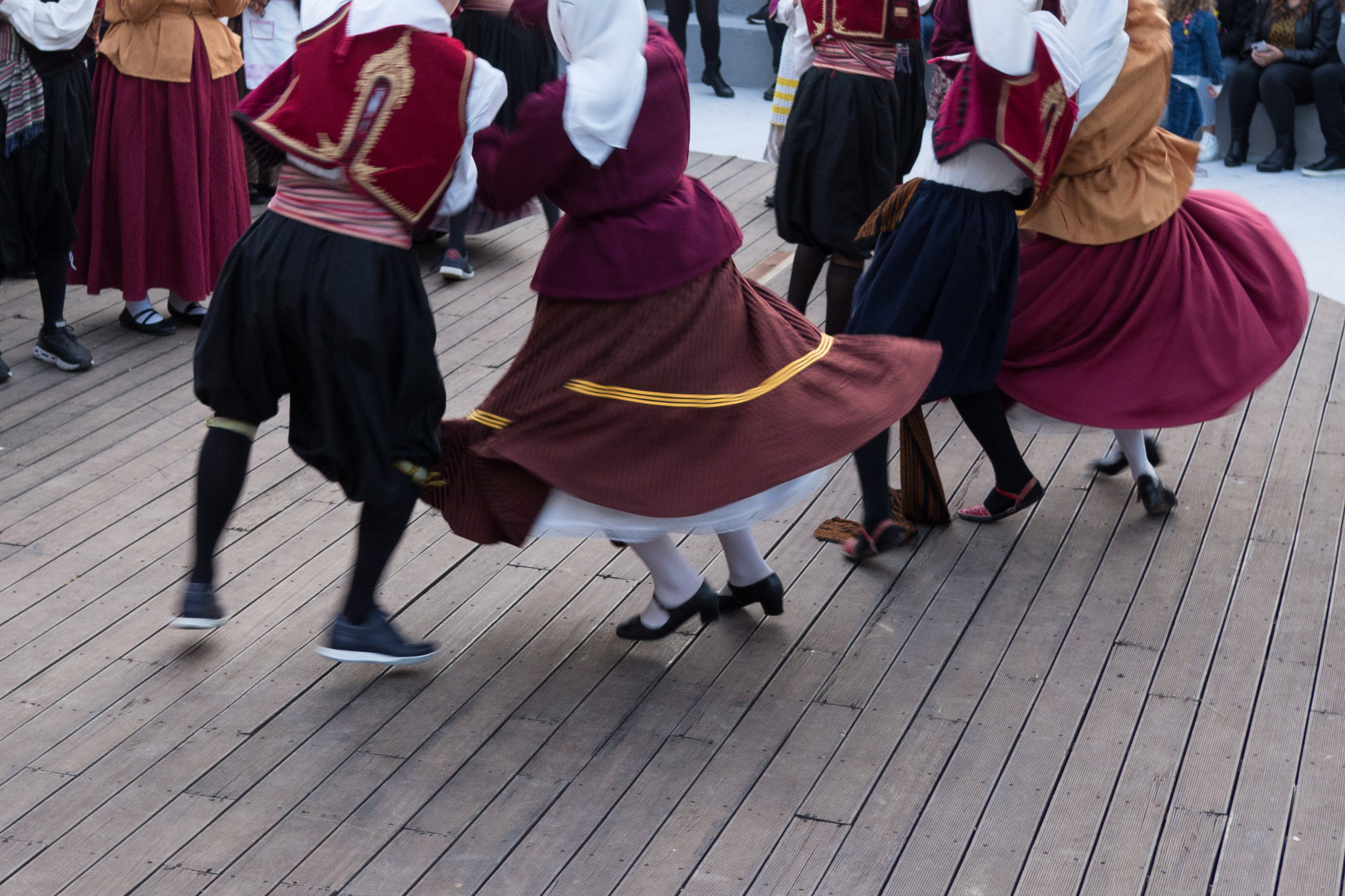
Dancers performing thermiotic ballos

Balos or Ballos of Kythnos (Greek: : Μπάλος της Κύθνου or Θερμιώτικος μπάλος) is a traditional folk dance of Greece, from the island of Kythnos. It is performed by both men and women.

== Description ==
Balos stands out from other kinds of balos dances because it is performed differently than the rest of the Greek islands. It is known for the multiple rotations of the dancing couple, the so-called "voltes" or "furles". It is considered as an integral part of the music and dance tradition of Kythnos, and it is performed especially during local festivals. In a proper Kythnos' feast, balos is performed after the sirto dance.

It is a paired and vigorous dance consisting of three parts. The dancers (men and women) perform continuous turns back to back around their axis and simultaneously with their partner, holding hands. It is considered a demanding dance, the specificity of which has been pointed out by distinguished Greek musicologists and choreographers, among them Dora Stratou and Domna Samiou.

== Bibliography ==
- Dora N. Stratou, Ελληνικοί Παραδοσιακοί Χοροί, Ζωντανός δεσμός με το παρελθόν, ΟΕΔΒ, Athens 1979.
