= Timanthes =

Ancient Greek painter

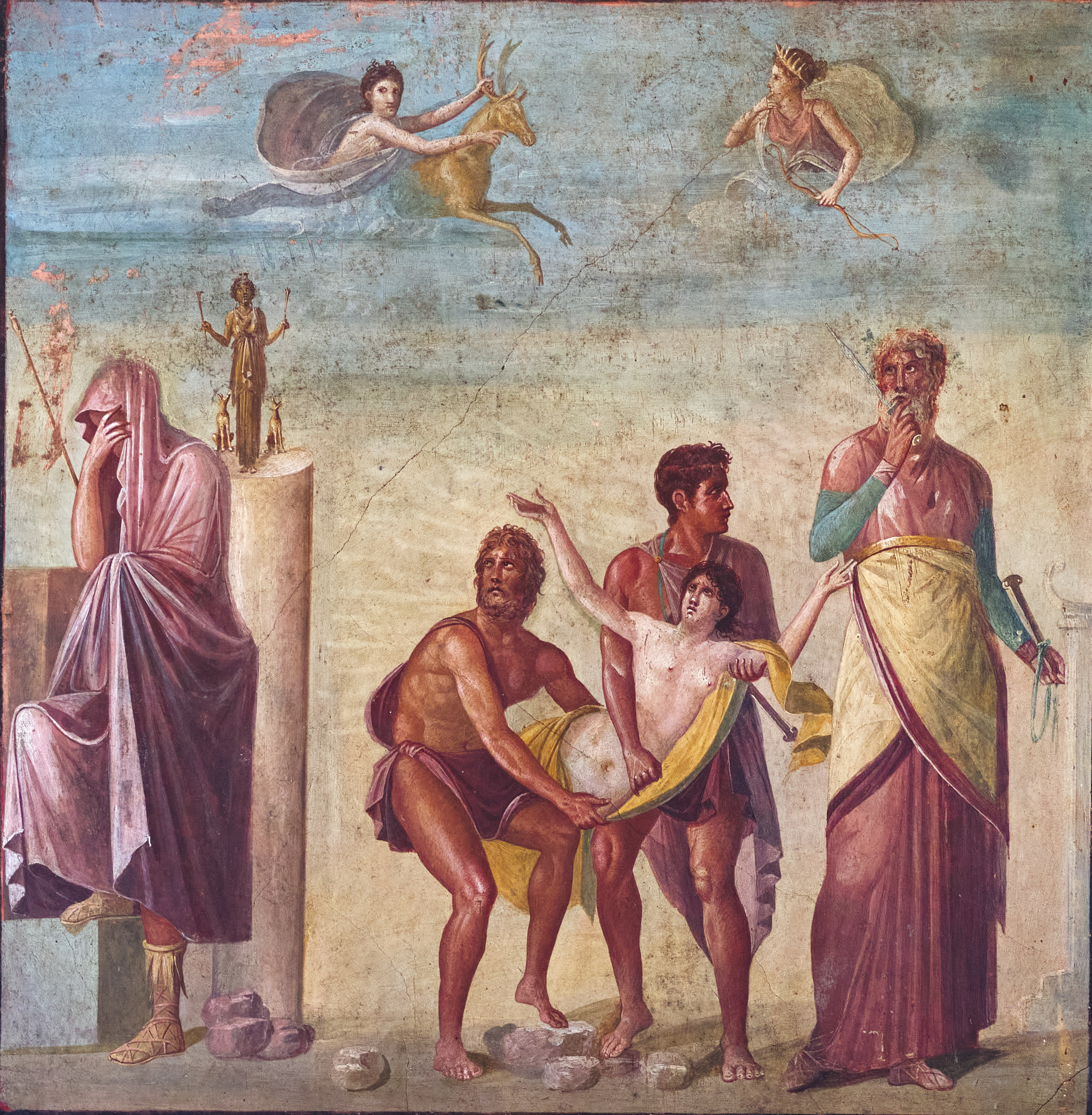
Sacrifice of Iphigenia. Antique fresco from Pompeii

Timanthes of Cythnus (Greek: Τιμάνϑης) was an ancient Greek painter of the fourth century BC. The most celebrated of his works was a picture representing the sacrifice of Iphigenia, in which he finely depicted the emotions of those who took part in the sacrifice; however, despairing of rendering the grief of Agamemnon, he represented him as veiling his face. Zeuxis, Timanthes and Parrhasius were painters who belonged to the Ionian School of painting. The Ionian School flourished during the 4th-century BCE.

A fresco discovered at Pompeii, and now in the Museum at Naples, has been regarded as a copy or echo of this painting (Wolfgang Helbig, Wandgemälde Campaniens, No. 1304).

== Influence ==
Timanthes' Sacrifice of Iphigenia was well-known in Rome through Pliny the Elder's description in Book 35 of his Natural History. Even before his description, Cicero and Quintillian used it to describe the effects of the four men who witnessed or partook of the sacrifice. Agamemnon is veiled since his sadness was so great that it could not be portrayed in paint. Iphigenia's suffering seems to be left out.

The painting had a strong impact in the Renaissance. Artists such as Giorgio Vasari and Peter Paul Rubens attempted to replicate the lost painting. Writers from Leon Battista Alberti to Jacopo Sannazaro, and from Michel de Montaigne to Gianbattista Marino, include the sacrifice in their works devoting all their attention to the sadness expressed by the four men and Agamemnon in particular. In Spain Juan Boscán redirects the suffering to Iphigenia
