= Merichas, Kythnos =

Human settlement in Greece

Coordinates: 37°23′17″N 24°23′49″E

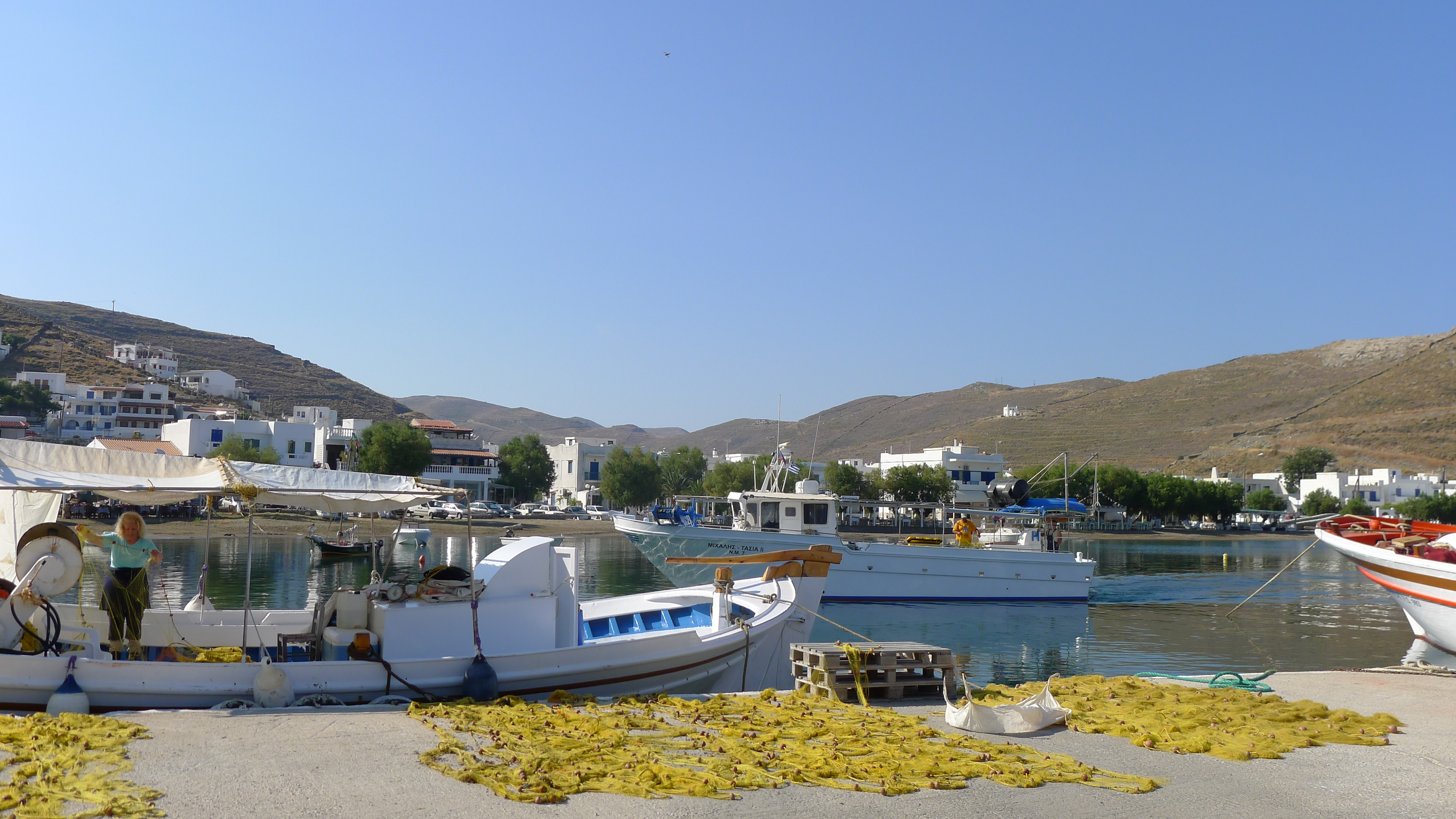
Merichas

Merichas is a seaside settlement and a port in Kythnos, Greece. It is the main port of the island. According to the 2011 Greek census Merichas population was 369 people.

== General information ==
Located on the W part of Kythnos, 7 kilometers from Chora, Merichas is the island's main port connected to Piraeus, Lavrion and other ports. Developed during the last decades, Merichas became the second most populous settlement in Kythnos after Chora and offers a variety of tourist facilities (hotels, shops, supermarkets etc.). It is also the seat of the island's Port Authorities.

Its name can be eventually traced back to the myrrh plant. The bay has been mentioned in the 16th century by the Greek seaman and cartographer Antonio da Millo under the name Merza. In the 19th century Merihas was considered a safe and spacious port and it was considered as the seaport of Dryopida. Around that time the first pottery kilns made their appearance and some continued to operate until the middle of the next century.

In the 1940s Merihas evolved into the most important seaport of the island with several fisher families as permanent residents. In the 1970s the port construction started in order to allow for boats to dock and in the 2000s restoration and expansion works were undertaken.

Nowadays Merihas is the main port of Kythnos and connects the island to the ports of Piraeus, Lavrion, and the rest of the Cycladic islands. It is one of the main residential areas of Kythnos and a tourist attraction during the summer months.

Administratively, after the 1940s, Merihas was under the jurisdiction of the province of Dryopida. In the 1997, as a result of the Kapodistrias Plan reform it was placed under the municipality of Kythnos where it remains until today. To the North of Merihas one can find the archaeological site of Vryokastro, the ancient capital of Kythnos, and the rocky islet of Vryokastraki.

== Gallery ==
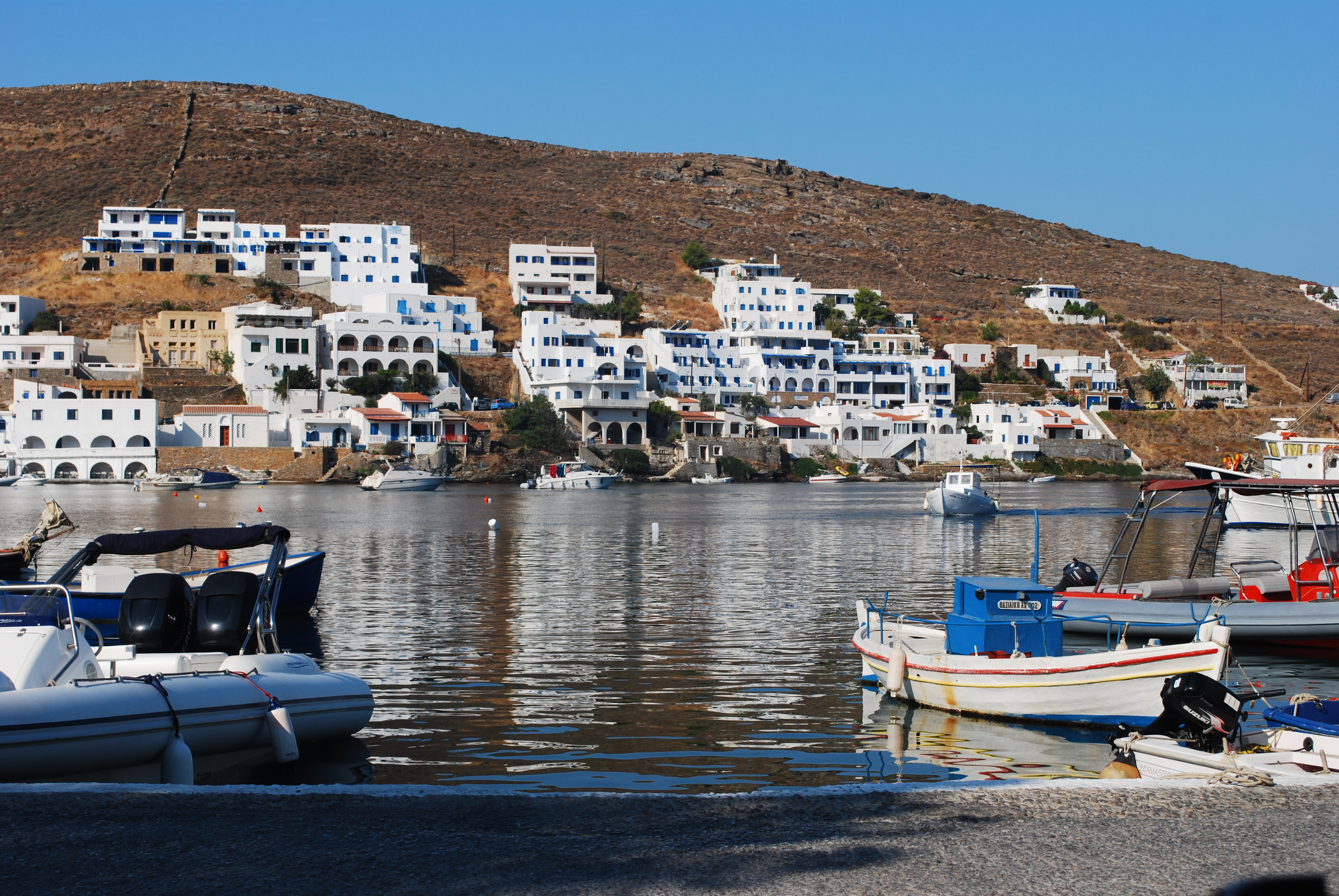
View of Merichas' port

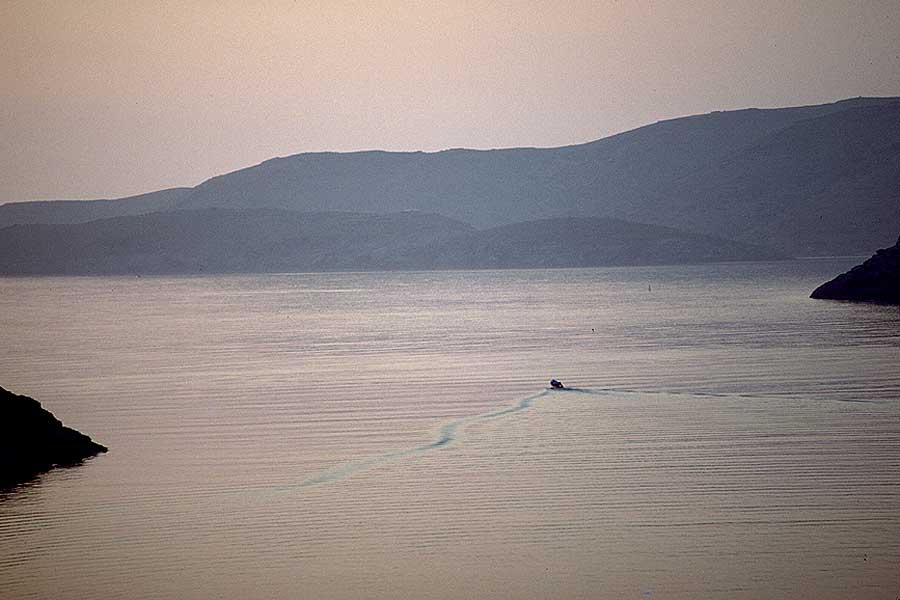
View from Merihas of the harbor at sunset

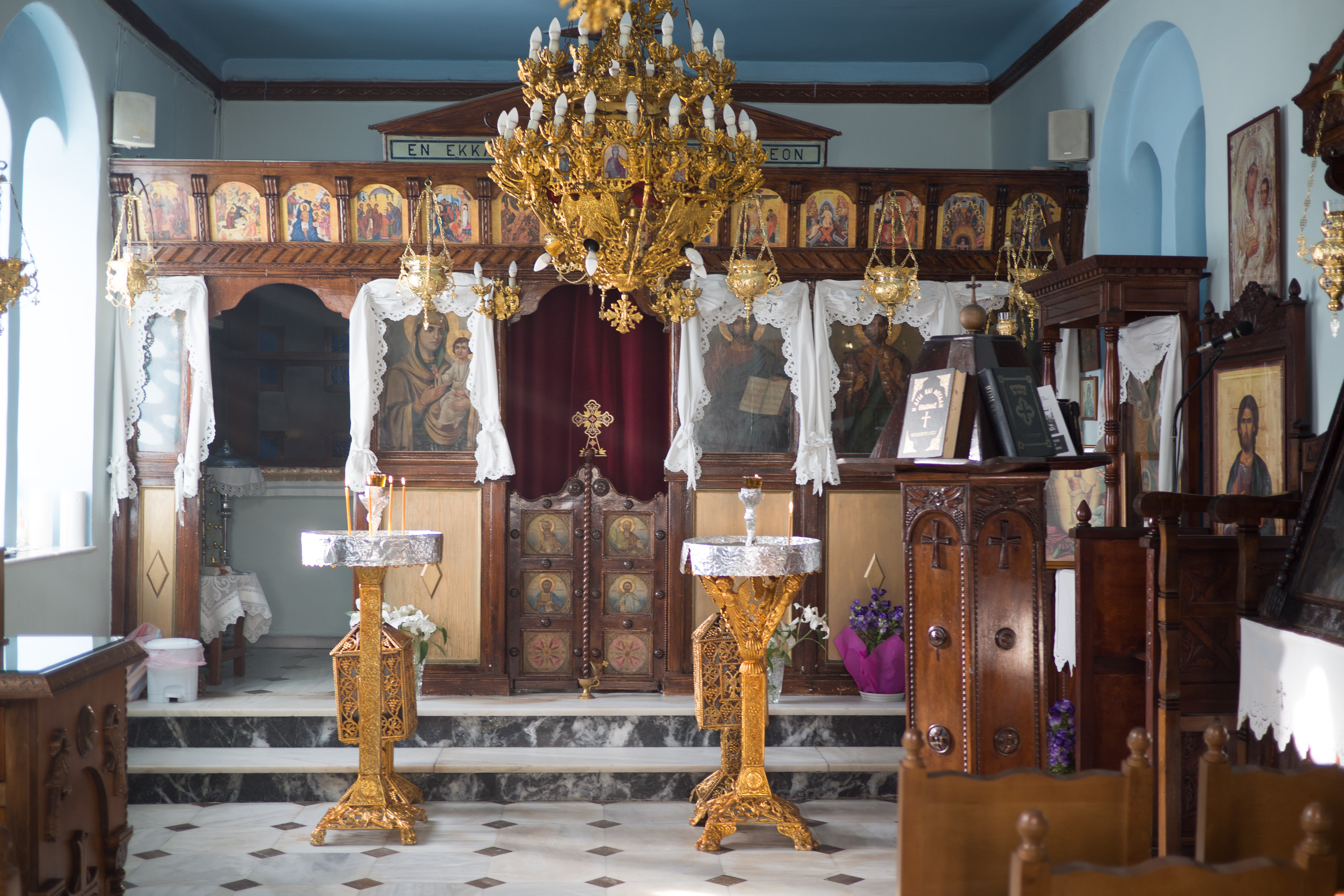
Interior of Saints Akindynoi church

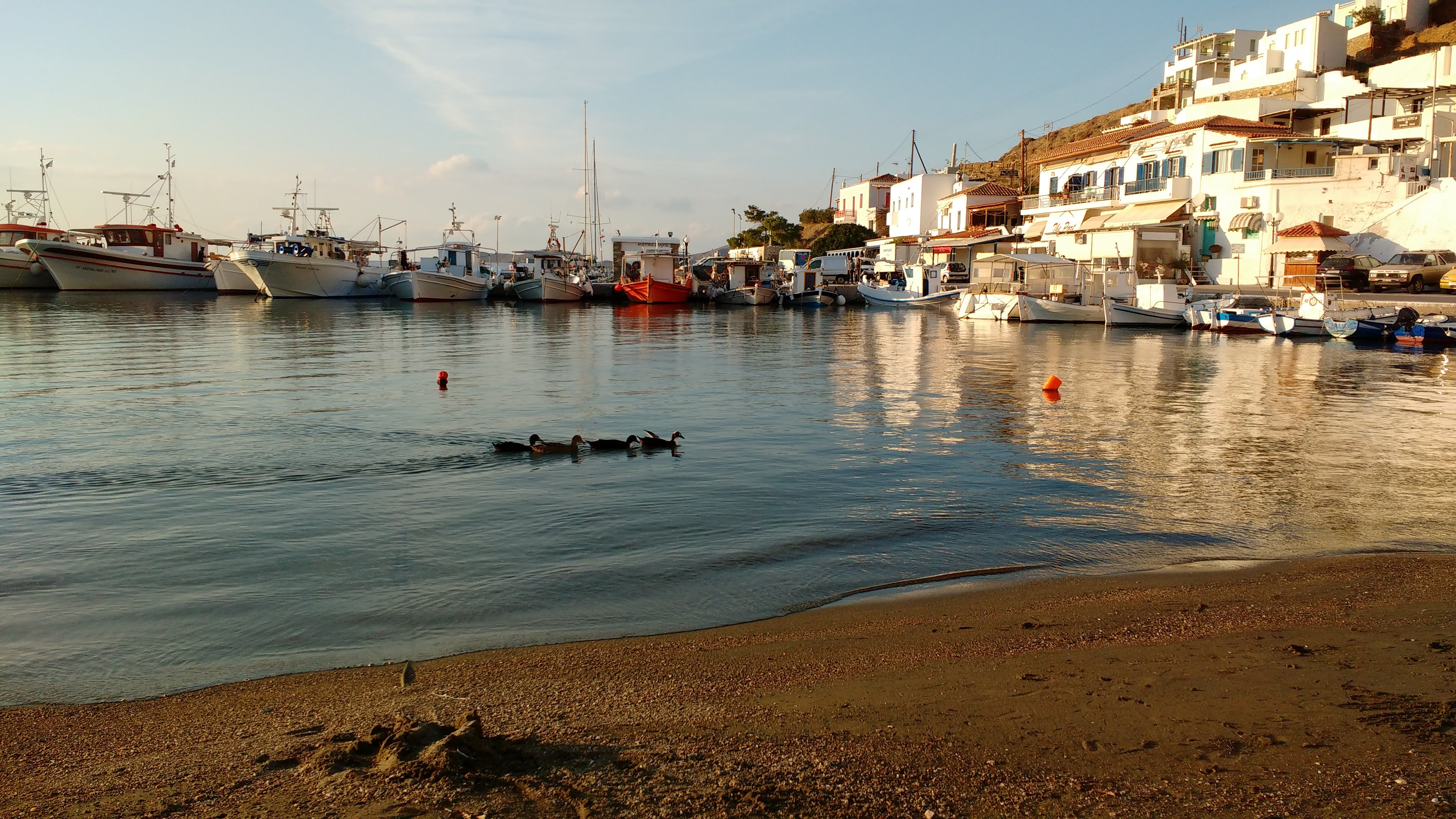
A view of Merichas

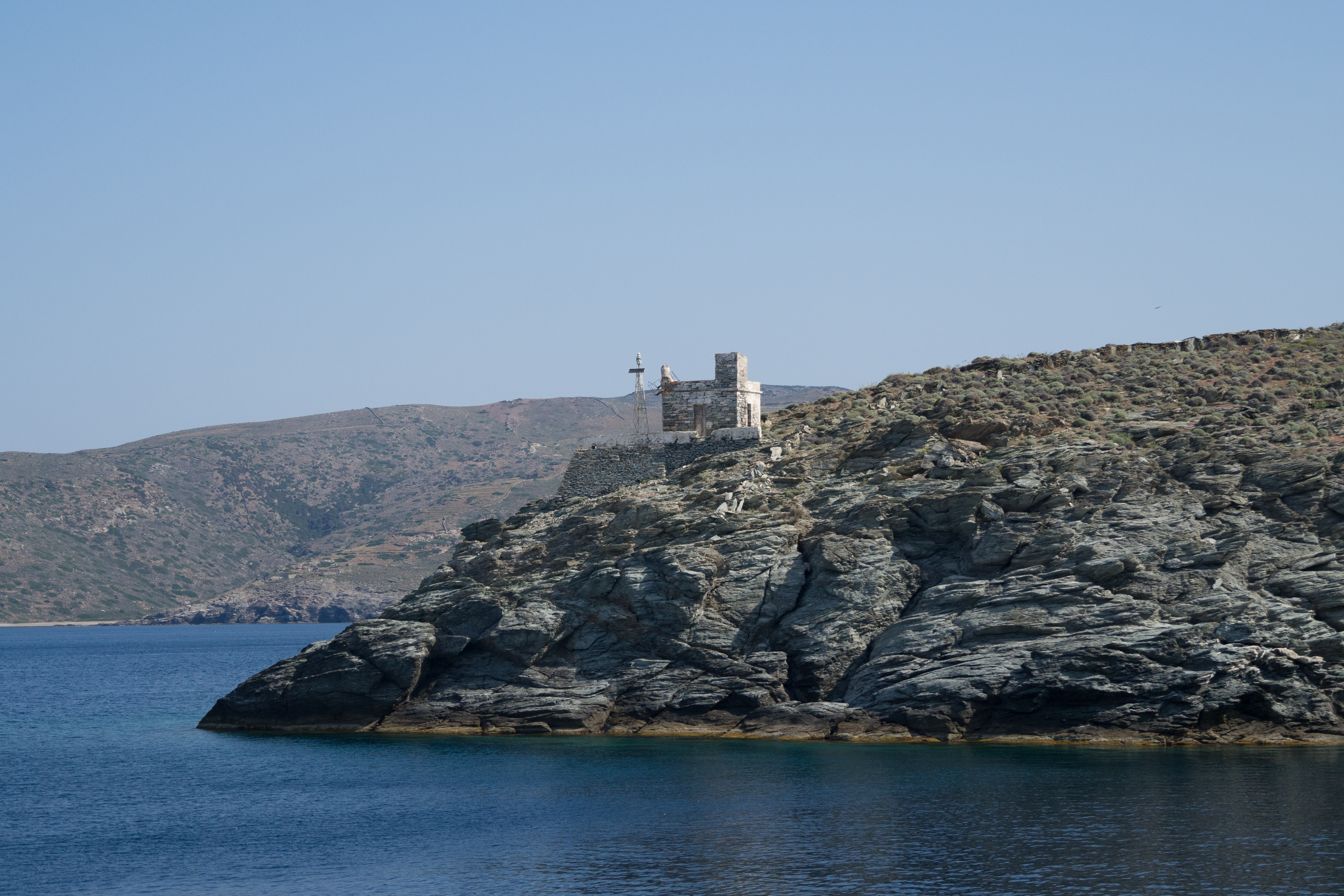
Merichas' lighthouse

== Bibliography ==
- Freely, John (2006). The Cyclades. Discovering the Greek Islands of the Aegean. London: I.B.Tauris & Co. Ltd.
- Hiliadakis, Stelios, Κύθνος, Εκδόσεις Μαθιουδάκη
- Valindas, Antonios (1882). Κυθνιακά ήτοι της νήσου Κύθνου χωρογραφία και ιστορία μετά του βίου των συγχρόνων Κυθνίων εν ω ήθη και έθη και γλώσσα και γένη κλπ.
- Veloudaki, Chrysanthi Anna (2020). Oria Kastro, an insular medieval settlement and fortress on Kythnos: an architectural, archaeological, and historical investigation. The University of Edinburgh-Thesis.
- Venetoulias, Giorgis, Τα κεραμικά της Κύθνου, Enplo Editions, 2004.
