= Antonio Millo =

Greek cartographer

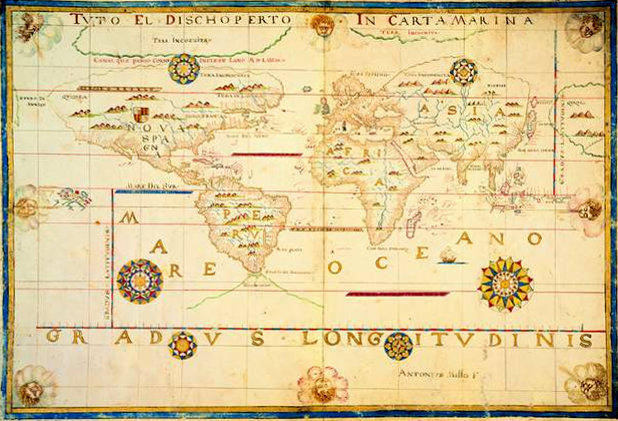
World map by Antonio Millo

Portolan chart of the eastern Mediterranean by Antonio Millo

Antonio Millo, also mentioned as Antonio Milo, active during 1557–1590, was a captain and cartographer who authored isolarios and portolan charts and atlases.

He was born during the 16th century in the island of Milos, in the Cyclades, which at the time was administered by the Republic of Venice. He lived part of his life in Venice. According to the records of the Greek community of Venice, someone called "Antonio Damilos" was married on 10 August 1599.

It has been suggested that Millo learned the art of mapmaking from Portuguese exile Diogo Homem, based on the similarity of their styles. He created many maps and atlases, mainly between 1580 and 1591. Several of his works have been preserved in Venice (in the Biblioteca Marciana di Venezia and the Museo Correr), in Rome (Biblioteca Nazionale Centrale di Roma), in Berlin (Staatsbibliothek), in London (British Library) and Warsaw (portolan from 1583 in the National Library of Poland).

As well as being a cartographer, he was a captain and navigator. In an isolario of 1590, he is mentioned as "Antonio Millo Armiralgio al Zante". In another isolario of 1591 he is mentioned as "Antonio Millo Armiralgio in Candia" and in another he is mentioned as "Antonius de Melo Cosmographus". The Venetian word armiralgio means harbour master and should not be mistaken for admiral. Scholar Johannes Leunclavius met Millo in 1582 in Venice and described him as an old Greek man born in Milos, who was hired by a naval officer to be their guide.
