= Panagia Kanala =

Icon and church in Kythnos, Greece

- Παναγιά Κανάλα
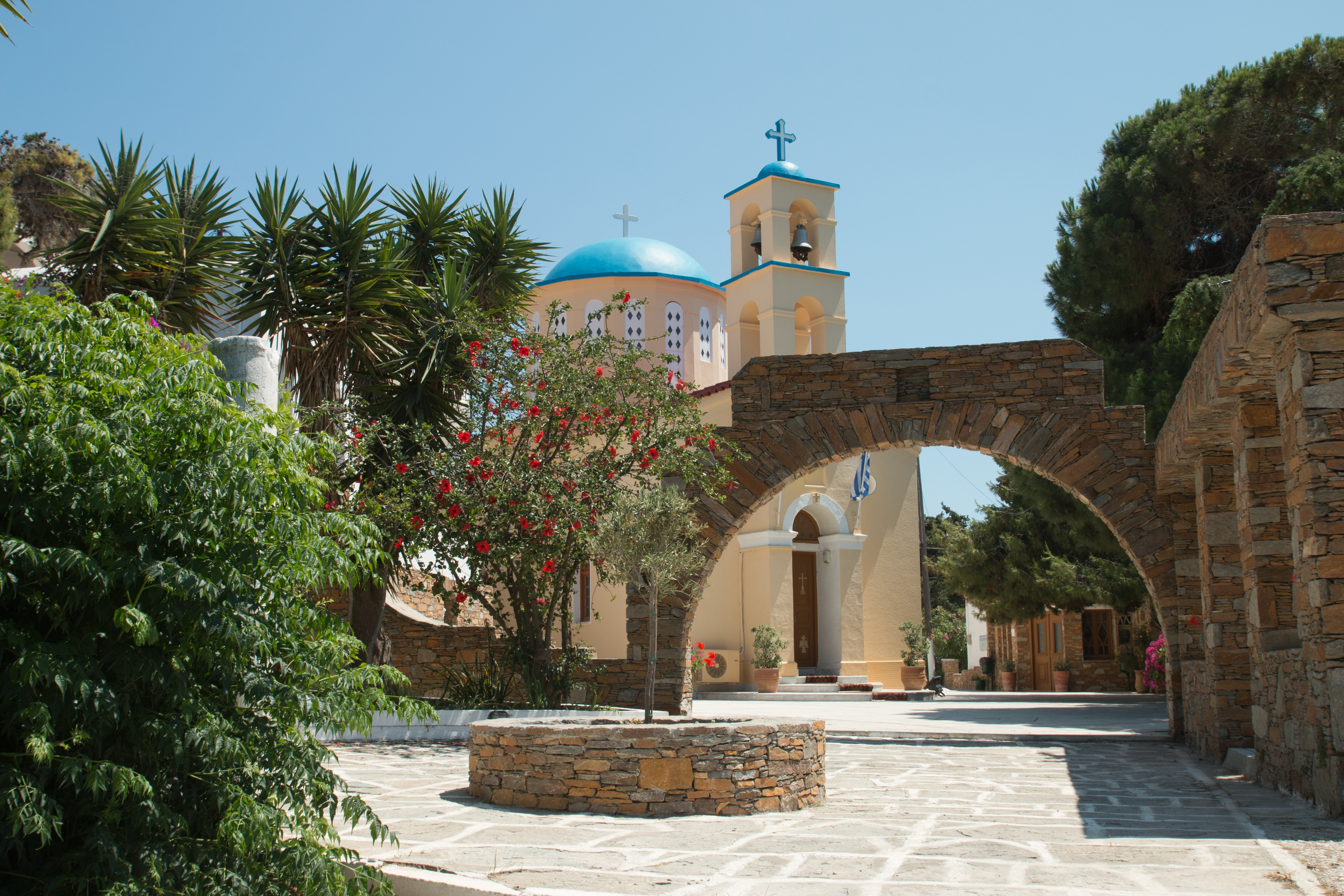
- The church exterior in 2019

- Location of the sanctuary and icon in Greece
- Panagia Kanala
- 37°20′41″N 24°26′10″E
- Location: Kanala, Kythnos, South Aegean
- Country: Greece
- Language: Greek
- Denomination: Greek Orthodox

History
- Status: Church-sanctuary and icon
- Dedication: Panagia (Virgin Mary)

Architecture
- Completed: 1869 (current structure)

The Panagia Kanala (Greek: Παναγιά Κανάλα) is a Greek Orthodox church-sanctuary that contains the religious icon of the Virgin Mary, called Panagia Kanala, located in Kanala, on the island of Kythnos, in the South Aegean region of Greece.

== The icon ==
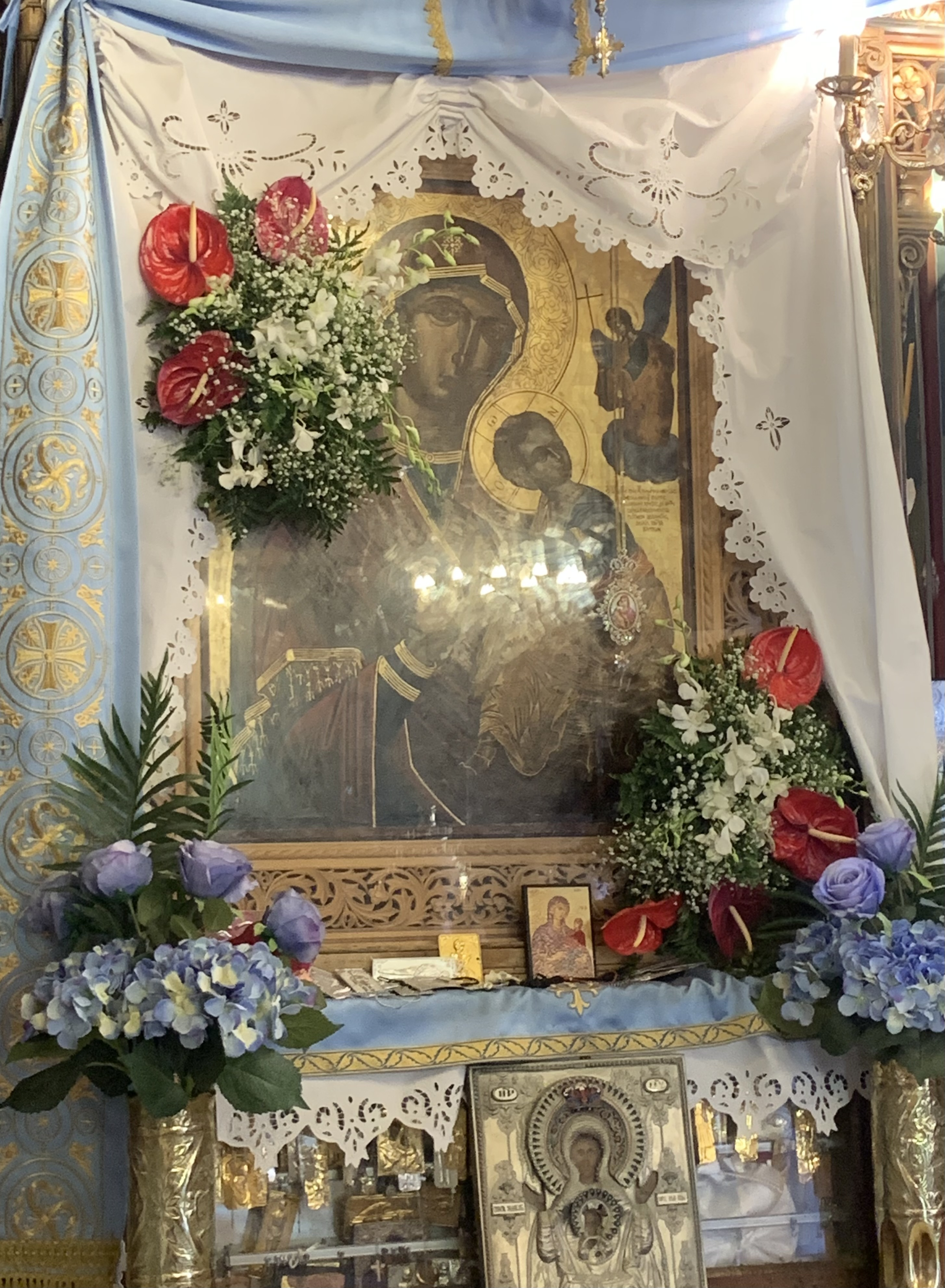
The icon of Panagia Kanala

The icon depicting the Virgin Mary holding Jesus to her right side and leaning her head slightly towards him, is an example of post-Byzantine art and is considered to be the work of the hagiographer Emmanuel Skordilis. The icon measures 1 by 0.8 metres (3 ft 3 in by 2 ft 7 in). In this icon, the figure of the Virgin Mary is depicted holding Christ in her arms with her left hand. To the left and right are the Archangels Gabriel and Michael.

According to the local tradition, the icon was miraculously found at night by fishermen in the waters between Kythnos and Serifos. The fishermen carried the icon to their village, Dryopida. Then, according to the same legend, the Virgin Mary appeared in the sleep of the fishermen and indicated to them the place where the church was to be built. The icon is considered as "wonderworking".

== The church ==
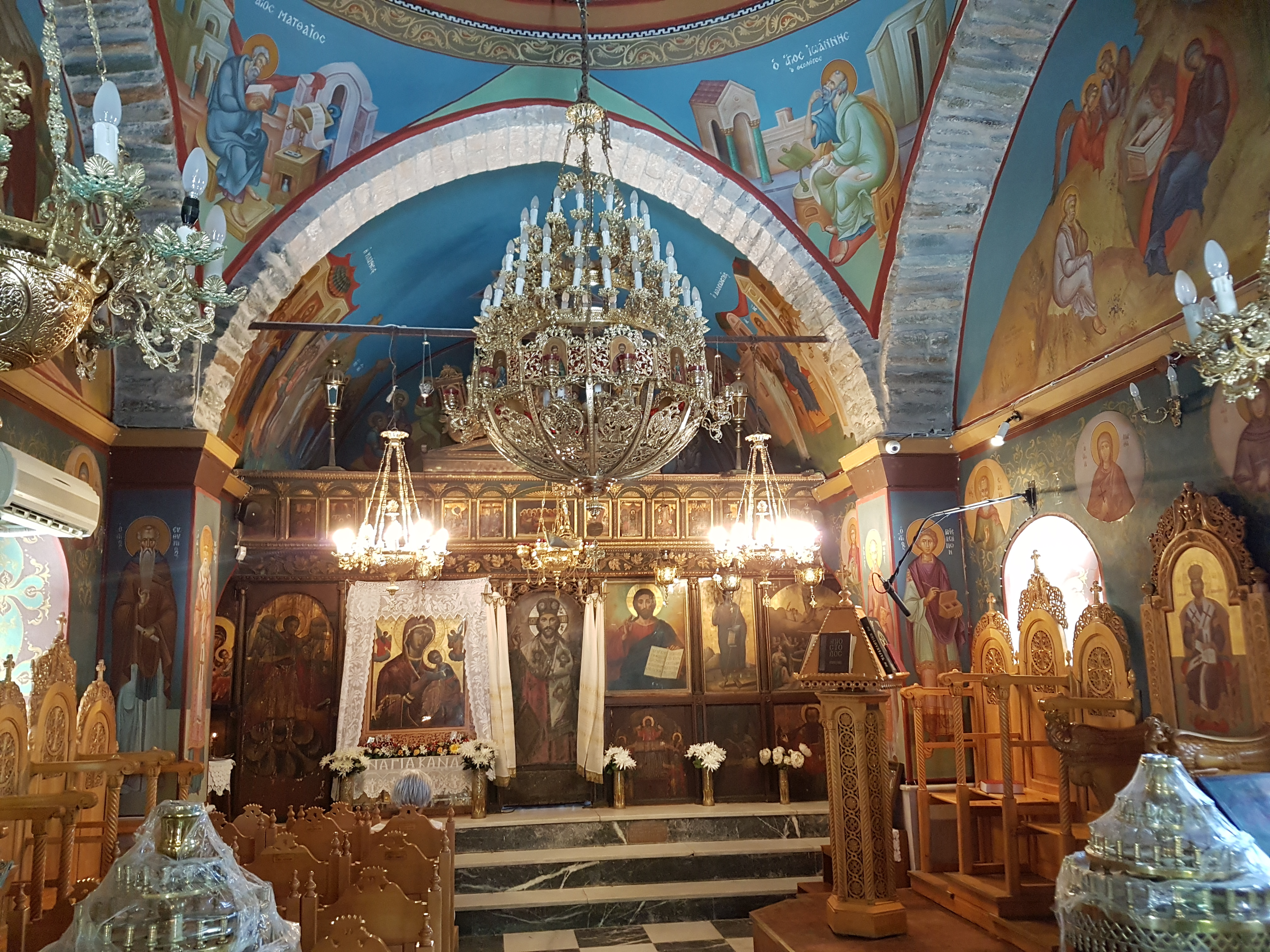
The church interior

The icon's sanctuary is in the homonymous church in the village of Kanala in Kythnos, in the southeastern part of the island. The original church was a makeshift construction of small size. In 1869 the original building was demolished and a new one was erected in its place, which with the contribution of the residents of Dryopida evolved over time to its present form, with the most significant changes to the site taking place after 1946.

In 1973 the church of Panagia Kanala was recognized as a Holy Pilgrimage by decree of the Holy Synod of the Church of Greece. The courtyard of the church is decorated with stone arches, terraces, dry stone walls and flowers and has a cobbled square.

== Festivals ==
Panagia Kanala is the patron saint of Kythnos and is considered as one of the most important places of pilgrimage in the Cyclades. She is celebrated every 15 August and from 1 August every afternoon, the sequence of the invocation canon or paraklisi is conducted, until 13 August, when the Vigil ("overnight vigil") is chanted in her honor. On the eve of the celebration, the Great Vespers are chanted, followed by a great festival in the village with traditional music and dancing.

The festivities culminate on the day of the celebration, when the liturgy is celebrated, followed by a procession of the icon of the Virgin Mary through the village. The procession ends at the pier where there is a re-enactment of the finding of the icon of the Virgin Mary. Another festival in honor of the Virgin Mary is held on 8 September, accompanied by a traditional feast.

== See also ==
- Church of Greece
- List of churches in Greece
- Shrines to the Virgin Mary
