= Katafyki Cave =

Cave in Kythnos, Greece

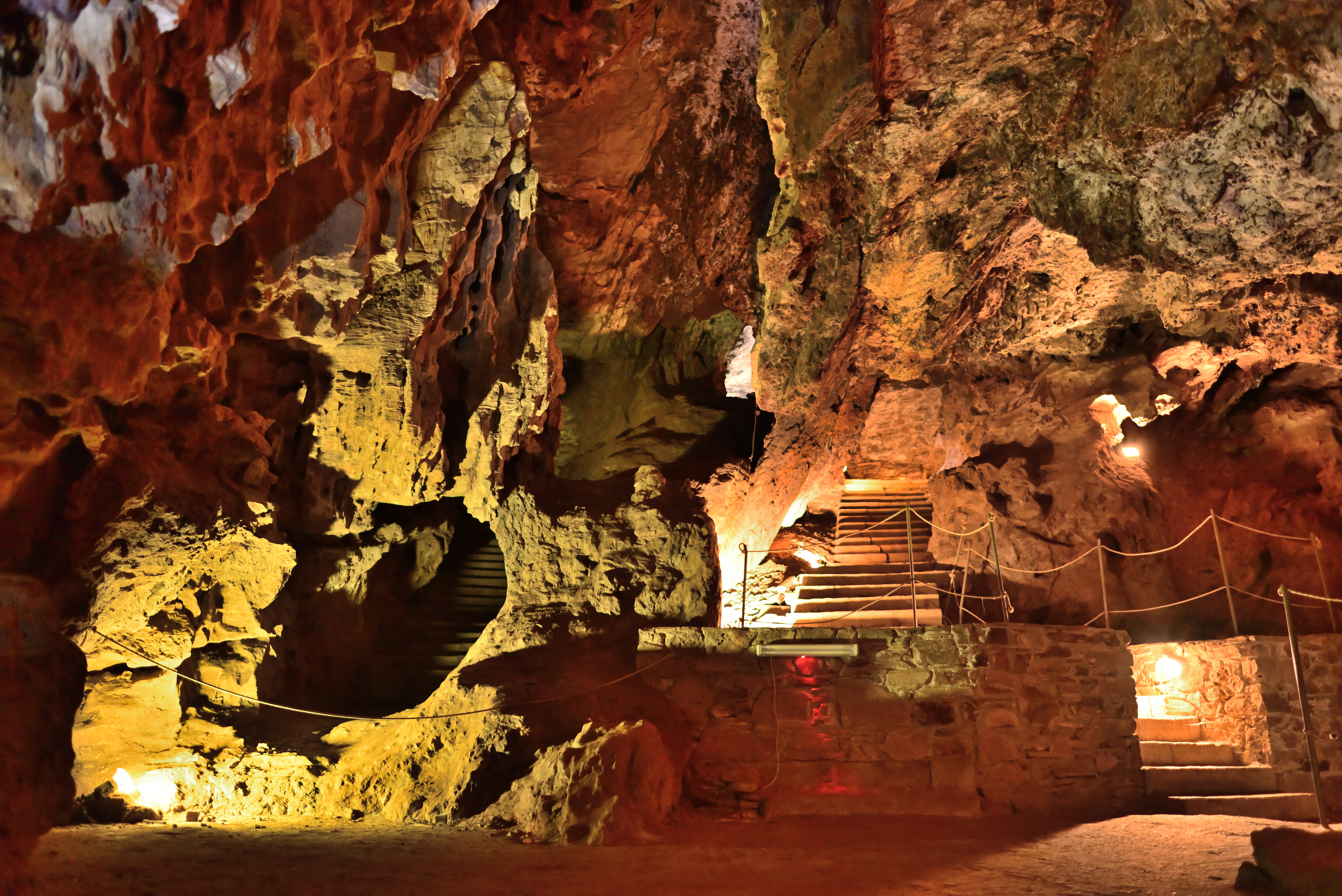
- Interactive map of Katafyki Cave
- Coordinates: 37°22′54″N 24°25′49″E

Katafyki (Greek: Σπήλαιο Καταφύκι) is a cave located in Dryopida on the island of Kythnos in the Cyclades. It has been named "Katafiki" as it has served as a shelter in various time periods. It also bears the name "Giorgos Martinos Cave" in honor of the geologist who studied it.

== Description ==
Katafyki cave is located in Fires of Dryopida. More than 600 meters of the natural cave have been mapped, which, having served as a mine, has a 2000-metre-long man-made gallery. Long tunnels have been formed in the cave due to the flow of water from a torrent. It is estimated that the cave's passageways cover an area of 3500 square meters.

At the entrance there is a plateau called the 'small plateau' and further on lies the 'large plateau' or piazza. In the 'large piazza' people of Dryopida used to hold religious festivals after the Resurrection during Easter. Further to the right there are corridors, two of which lead to the 'stalactite hall', of an area of 25x17 meters, where one can find stalactites and stalagmites.

The stalactites in the hall are of various colours and shapes and have names such as 'jellyfish', 'octopus', 'teddy bear', etc. A large stalagmite is called 'Tower of Babel'. To the right of the room are sheets of limestone and iron ore. In another area of the cave, there is a "trough" formation as water accumulates there between the stalactites and stalagmites. Blasting has destroyed much of the general stalactite and stalagmite decoration in the cave, as have, to a lesser extent, fires from rituals within the cave. The rocks of the cave are stratified vertically into shale, marble and slate. The cave operated as an iron mine and the main mineral extracted was hematite.

Access to the cave is easy as it is located within the settlement of Dryopida. Because of its use as a mine, it contains ravines that in the past made it dangerous to visit. It is illuminated and its temperature is 17°C, and can visited through a circular path. In several places there are visible remnants of the cave's previous use as a mine, such as rails, wagons, etc.

== Mine ==
The cave may have been used as a mine since antiquity, as there are references to metal mines in Kythnos in the literature. Iron mining in modern times lasted from 1835 to 1940, while after 1910 exploitation was carried out by foreign companies.

== Management and restoration ==
The cave is managed by the Municipality of Kythnos. In July 2015, it was made accessible again to the public after a two-year period in which the Ministry of Culture had suspended public access due to safety concerns.

== Gallery ==
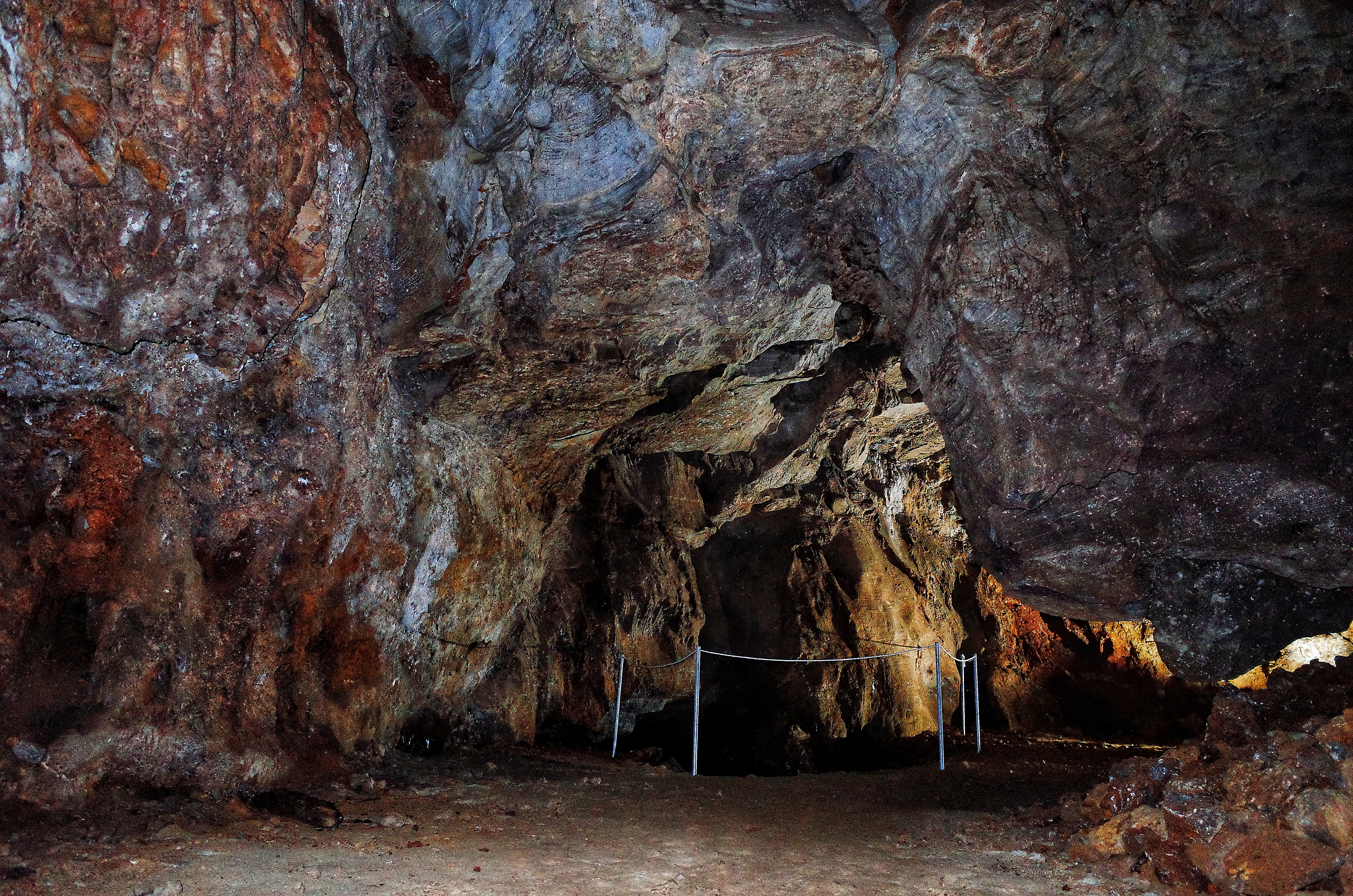
Interior view

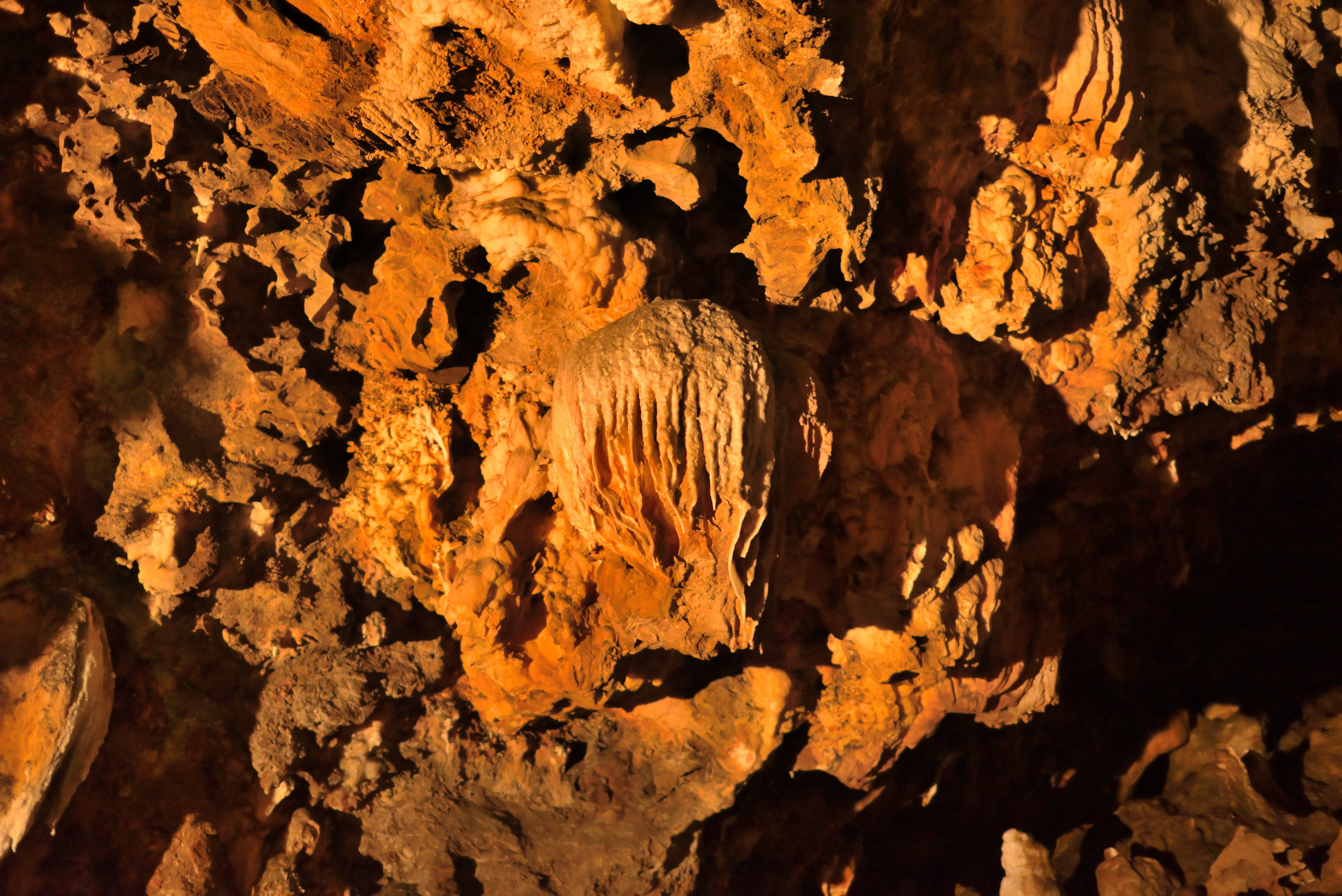
"Jellyfish"

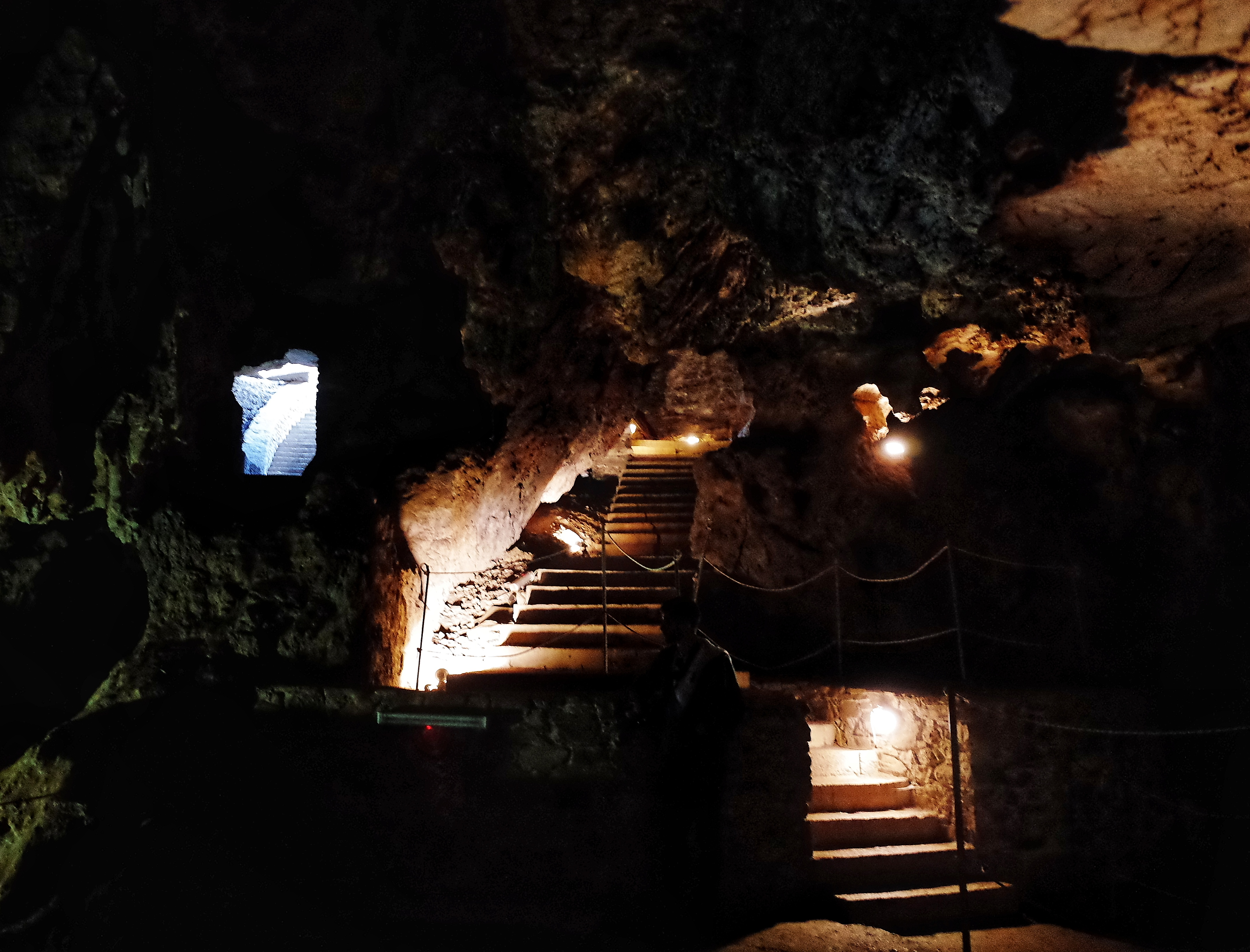
View from the inside
