= Kanala, Kythnos =

Coordinates: 37°20′48″N 24°26′10″E

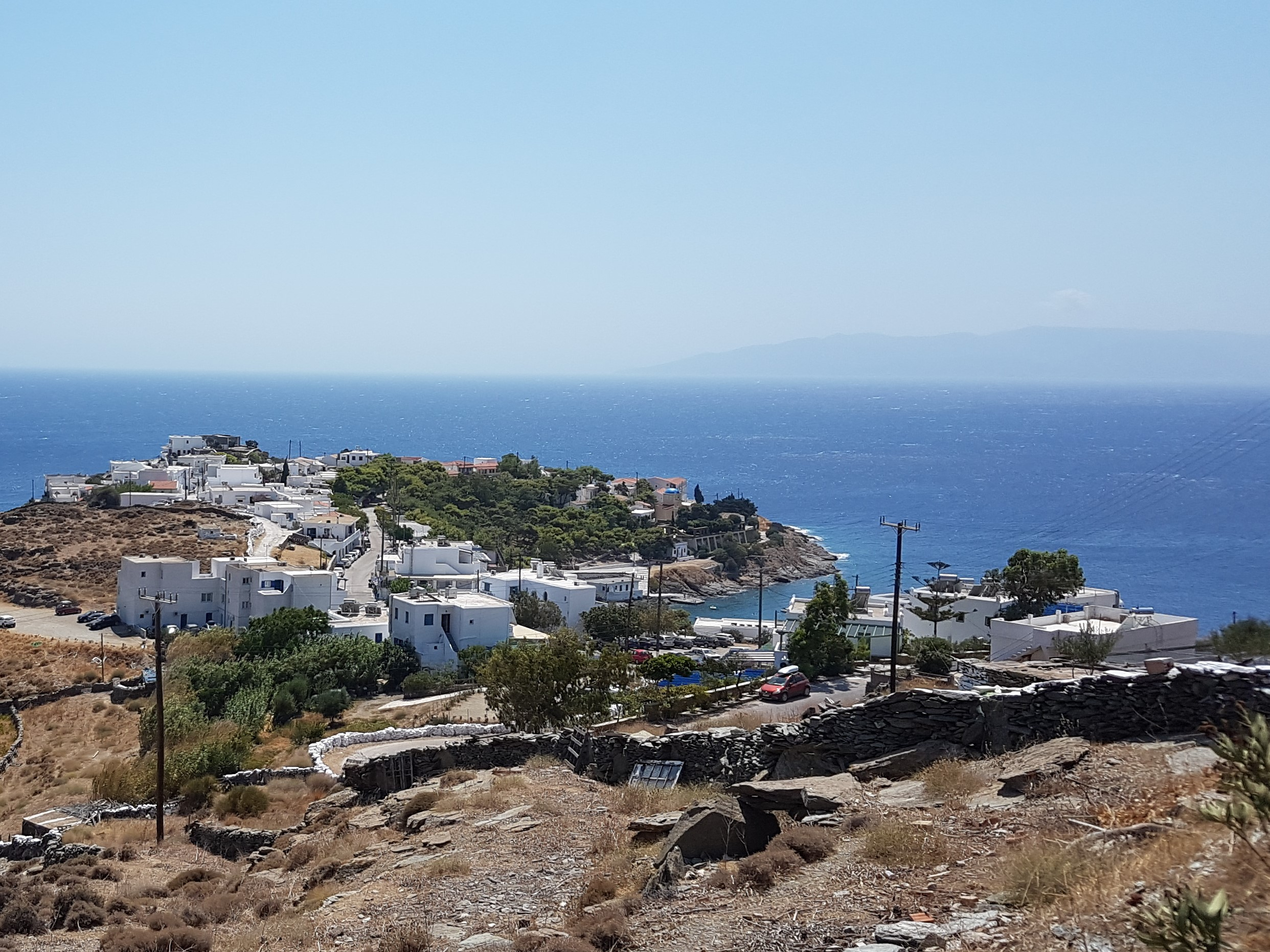
Kanala

Kanala is a seaside settlement in Kythnos, Greece. According to the 2011 Greek census its population was 24 people. It is known for the church of Panagia Kanala.

== Description ==
Kanala is located on the southeastern coast of Kythnos, 12 kilometers (7.5 mi) from the port of Merihas, 10 kilometers (6.2 mi) from Chora, and 5 kilometers (3.1 mi) from Dryopida. It is named after the church and icon of Panagia Kanala, the latter attributed to a Greek painter of the 17th century. The village It is built on a cape, between 3 consecutive beaches (Antonides, Ammoudaki & Psili Ammos). Kanala is known for its two grand fests or panigiri dedicated to Virgin Mary, on 15 August and 8 September.

It was first recorded as a settlement in the 1961 census with six inhabitants. Administratively it belonged until 1997 to the community of Dryopida, and since then it has been part of the municipality of Kythnos.

== Panagia Kanala ==
The current church of Panagia Kanala was built in 1869 on the site of an older church. It is a place of religious pilgrimage, as the homonymous icon of the Virgin Mary is kept there, which is honoured by the Orthodox Church as a miraculous icon. According to tradition, it was found by local fishermen in the narrow channel between Kythnos and Serifos, and is referred to as the work of the hagiographer Emmanuel Skordilis.

Every 15 August, celebrations take place in the settlement, including a procession of the icon, a re-enactment of its discovery and a big festival. A festival is also held on 8 September.

== Gallery ==
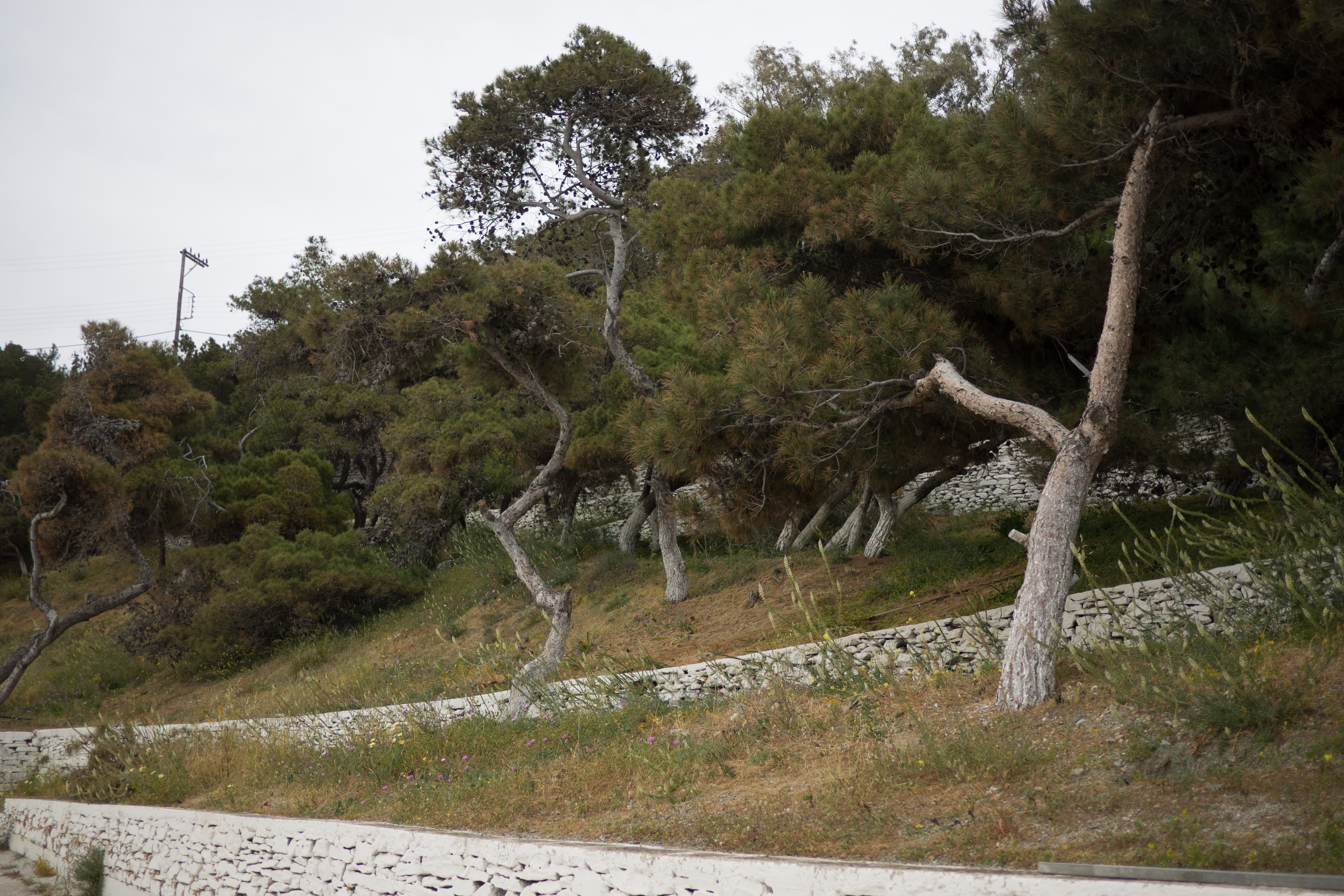
Kanala pine forest

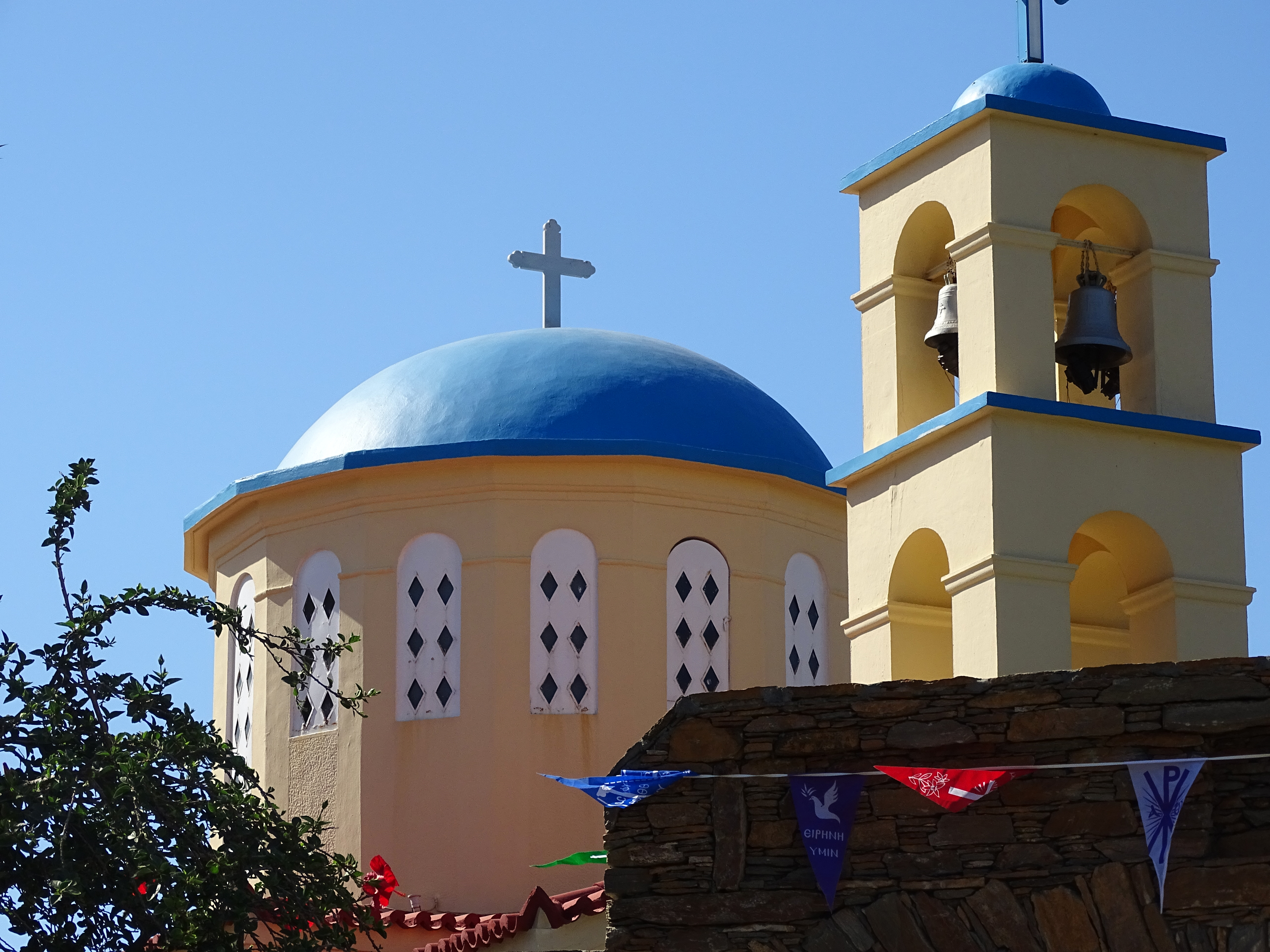
Panagia Kanala

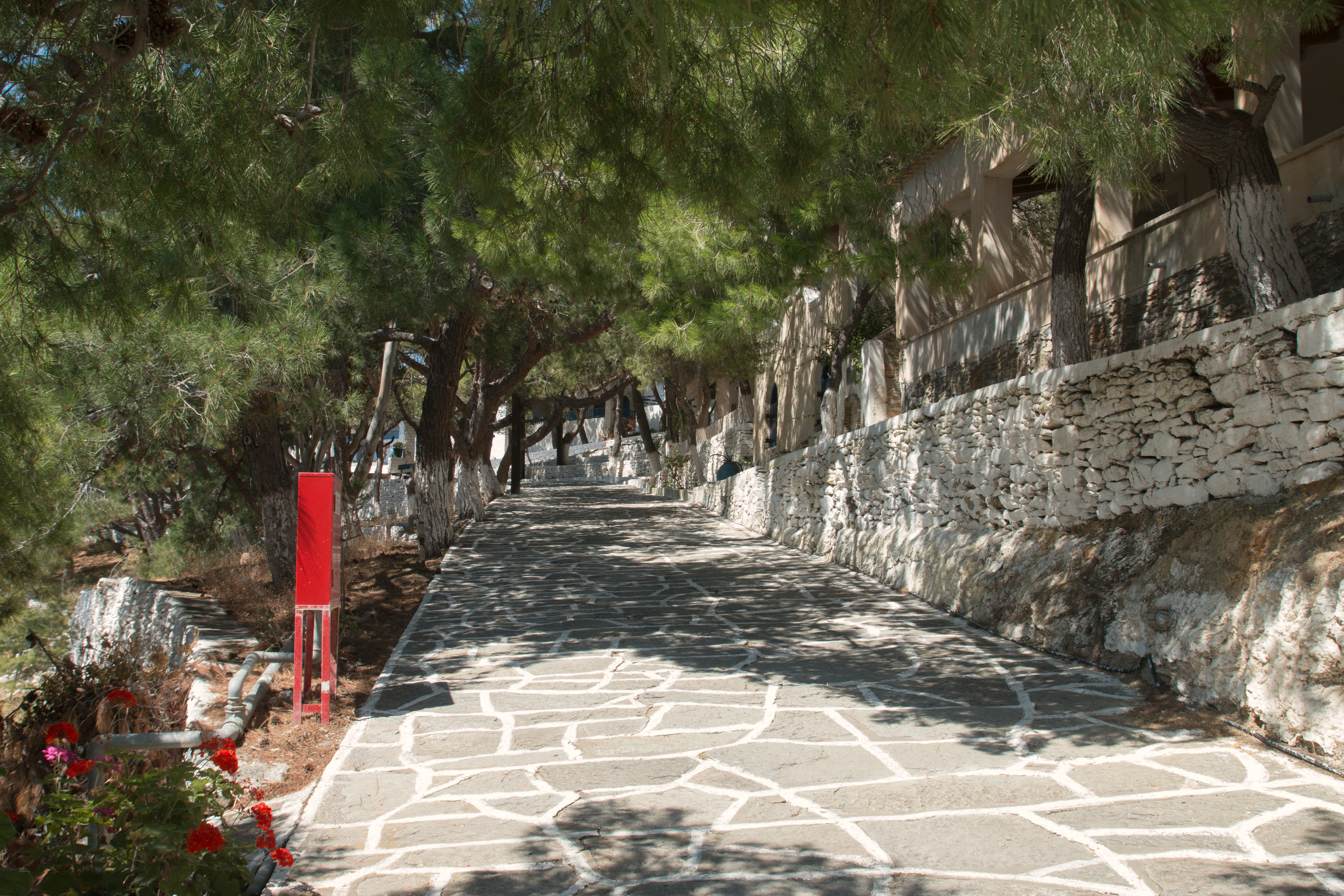
Within the area of Panagia Kanala

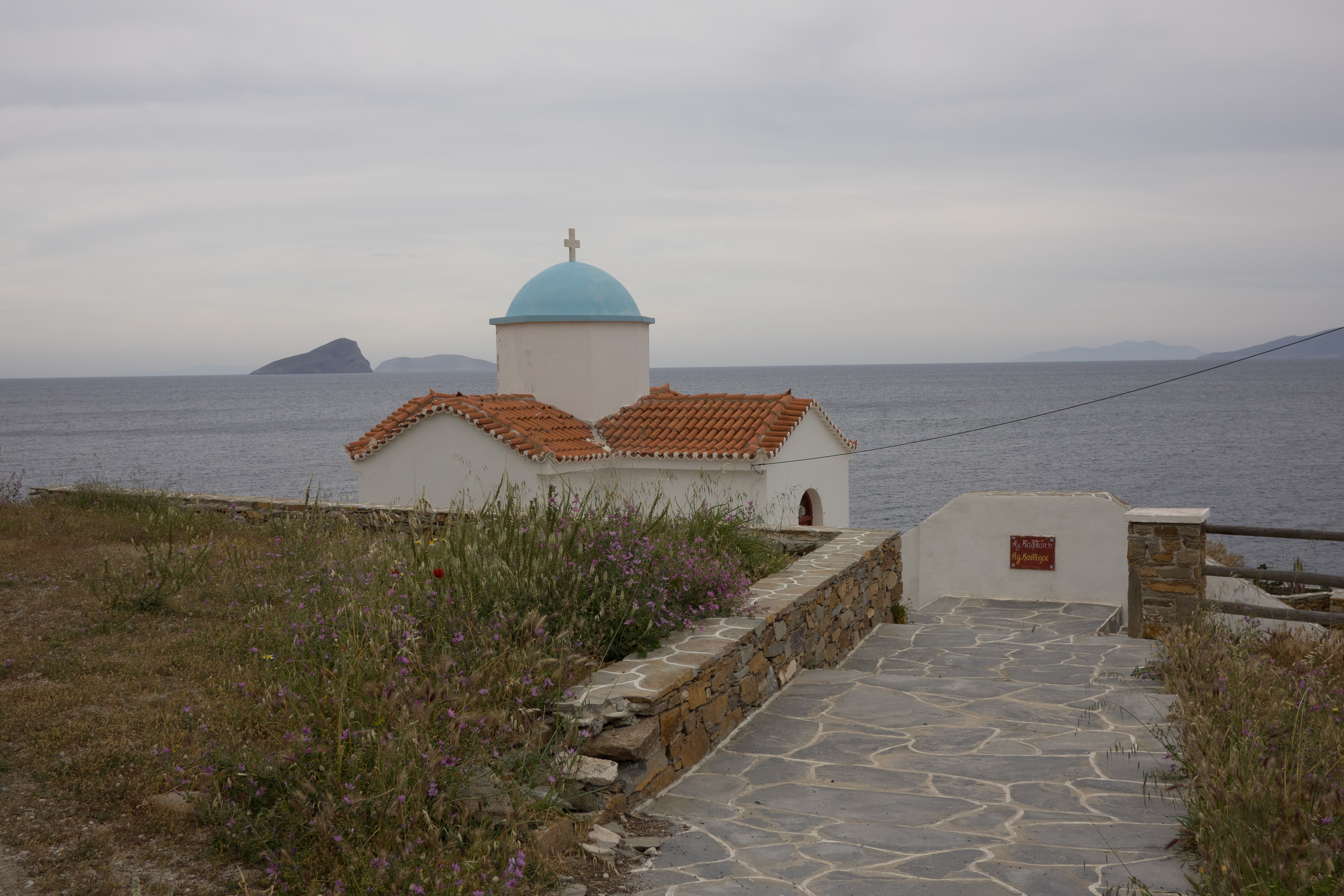
The church of Agia Kalliopi

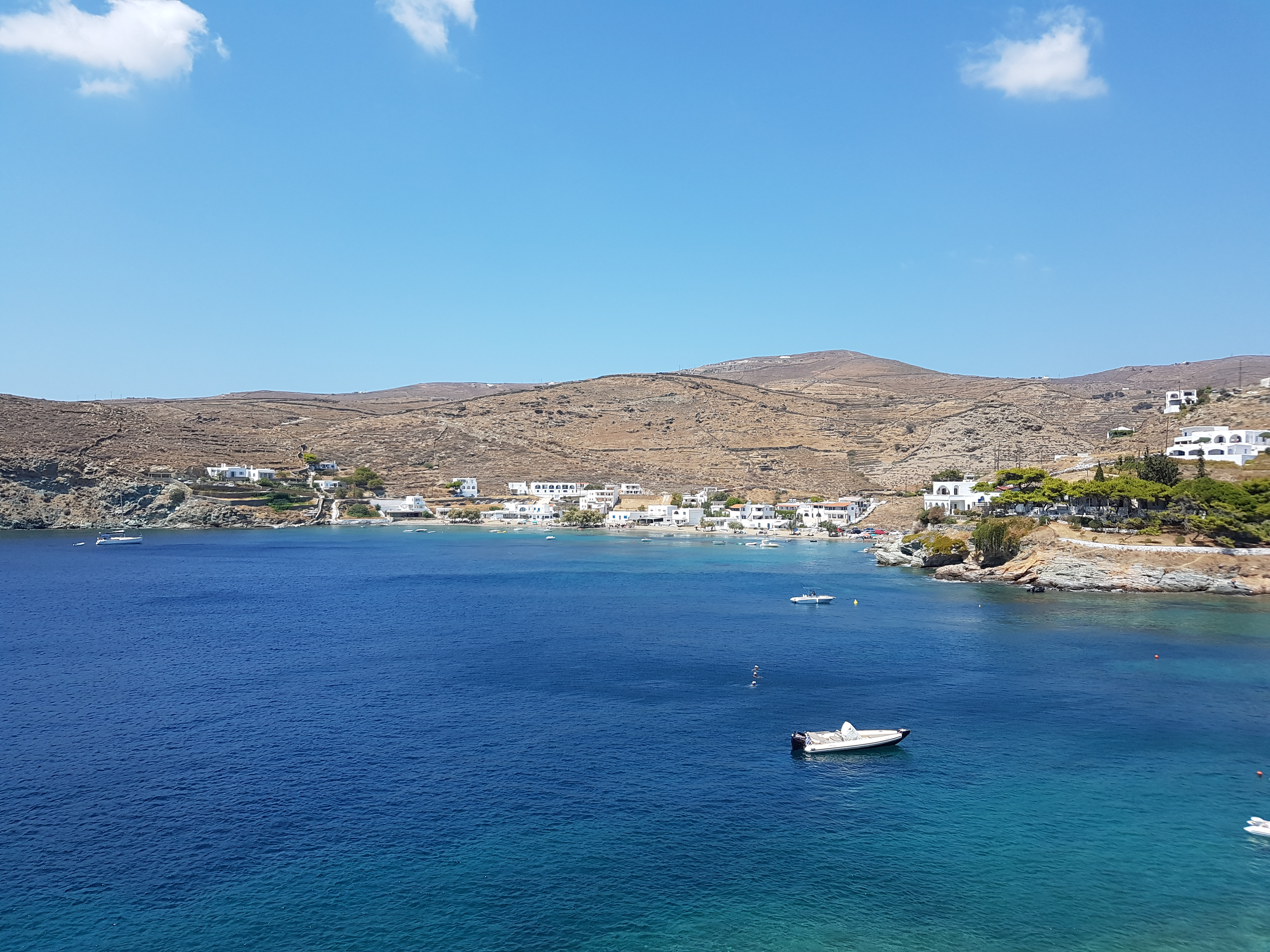
Megali Ammos Beach

== Bibliography ==
- Freely, John (2006). The Cyclades. Discovering the Greek Islands of the Aegean. London: I.B.Tauris & Co. Ltd.
