= Chora, Kythnos =

Chora Χώρα
- Settlement
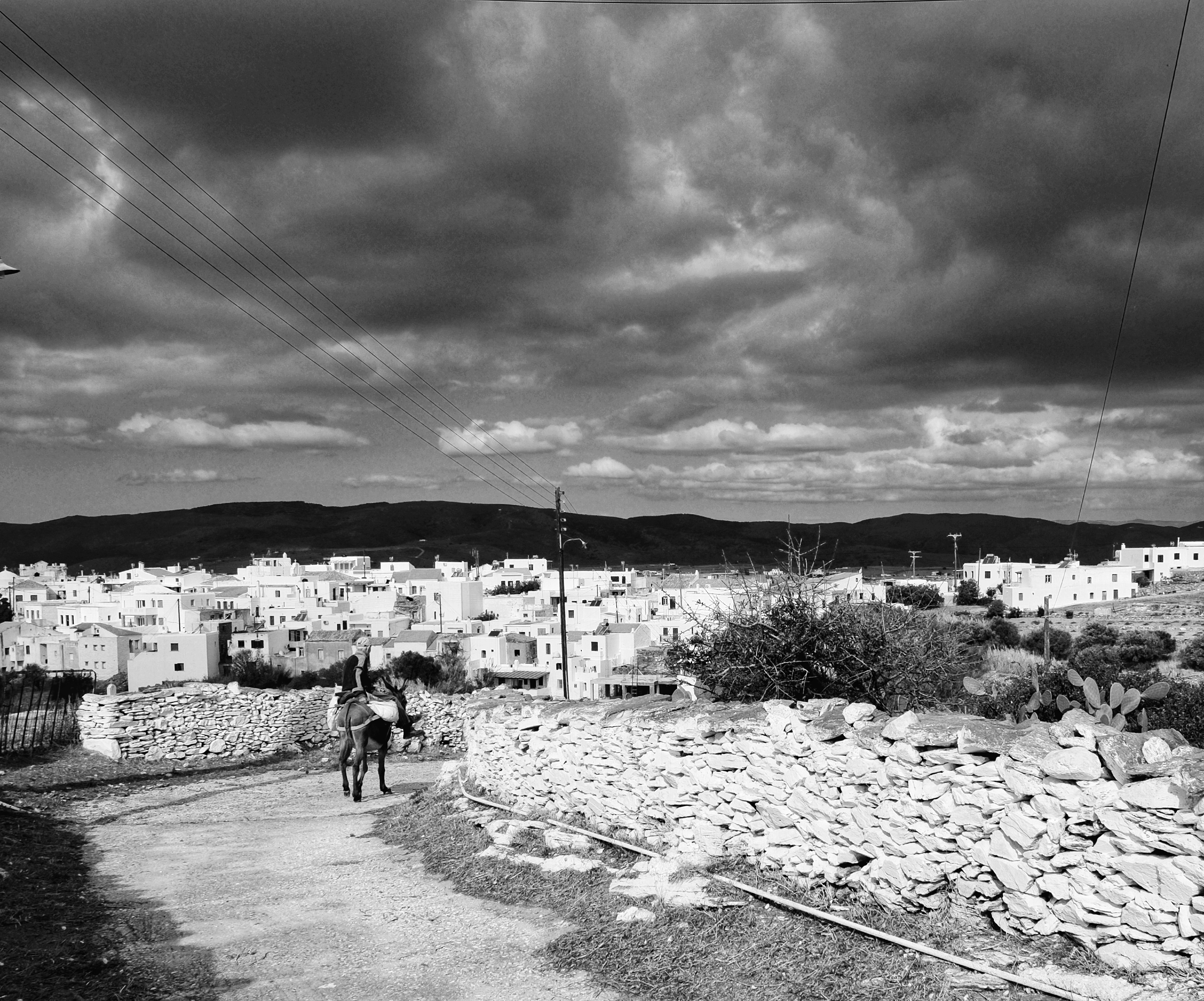

- Location within Greece
- Coordinates: 37°24′45″N 24°25′50″E
- Country: Greece
- Administrative region: South Aegean
- Regional unit: Kea-Kythnos
- Municipality: Kythnos

Population (2021)
  - Total: 621
- Time zone: UTC+2 (EET)
  - Summer (DST): UTC+3 (EEST)

Chora (official name Kythnos Κύθνος, also called Mesaria Μεσαριά) is the capital of Kythnos and the seat of the Municipality of Kythnos. According to the 2021 Greek census it has 621 inhabitants.

== Name ==
As is customary for many Aegean island capitals it is called Chora but is also known to locals as Mesaria. This name is attributed to the fact that it is built inland, so in the middle (mesi) of the island. Another explanation might be that the name derives from the Frankish word Missaria. The inhabitants are called Mesariotes.

== Description ==
Chora is located in the central and northern part of the island. It used to be a small agricultural community but developed into a larger village in the 17th century and onwards. According to legend the inhabitants left their capital, The Castle of Oria or Katakefalo in 1537 A.D. after the pirate's Barbarossa’s invasion and preferred to settle away from the coast in Messaria. According to the same legend the first houses were built around Agia Triada (Holy Trinity).

1791 saw the operation of the island's first school, in the Monastery of the Virgin of Nikous, on the outskirts of Chora. The first teacher was the monk Parthenios Koulouris from Sifnos, who was then succeeded by a local monk, Makarios Filippaios, who taught successfully for several years. After the Greek Revolution, Chora was proclaimed the official capital of the island.

The first three classes of the Elementary School of Kythnos are housed in Chora. The other classes are in a different location, namely in Dryopida. There is also a regional medical center and various tourist businesses and restaurants.

== Sightseeings ==
Chora has many churches and two monasteries, Agia Triada (Holy Trinity), the oldest church on the island, the Church of Saint Savvas dating from the 17th century, the Church of Metamorfosis Sotiros (Transfiguration of Christ) with an iconostasis dating to the 17th century, the church of Saint John Theologos, Saint Nicholas, Saint Barbara in Asteras, the Monastery of the Virgin of Nikous and the Monastery of St John the Baptist in Chordaki. Old destroyed windmills can be found in Chora.

Chora is scheduled to acquire the new Archeological Museum of Kythnos, which will house many finds and artifacts from the ancient capital of the island, Vryokastro. It is also meant to house the open-air Archeological Collection of the Park of Katholiko of Chora where sculptures and architectural finds have been exhibited since 1973.

== Gallery ==
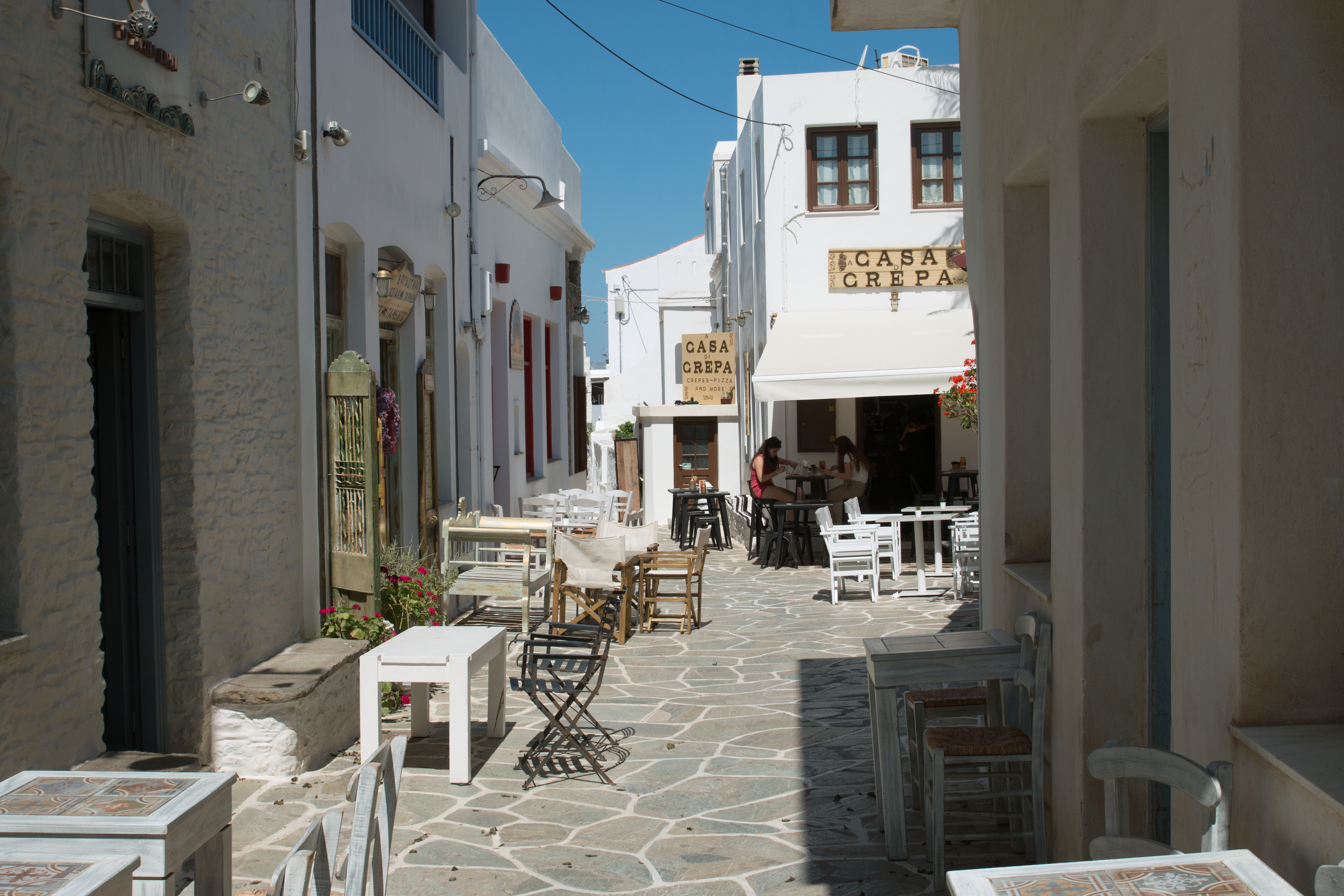
A typical alley

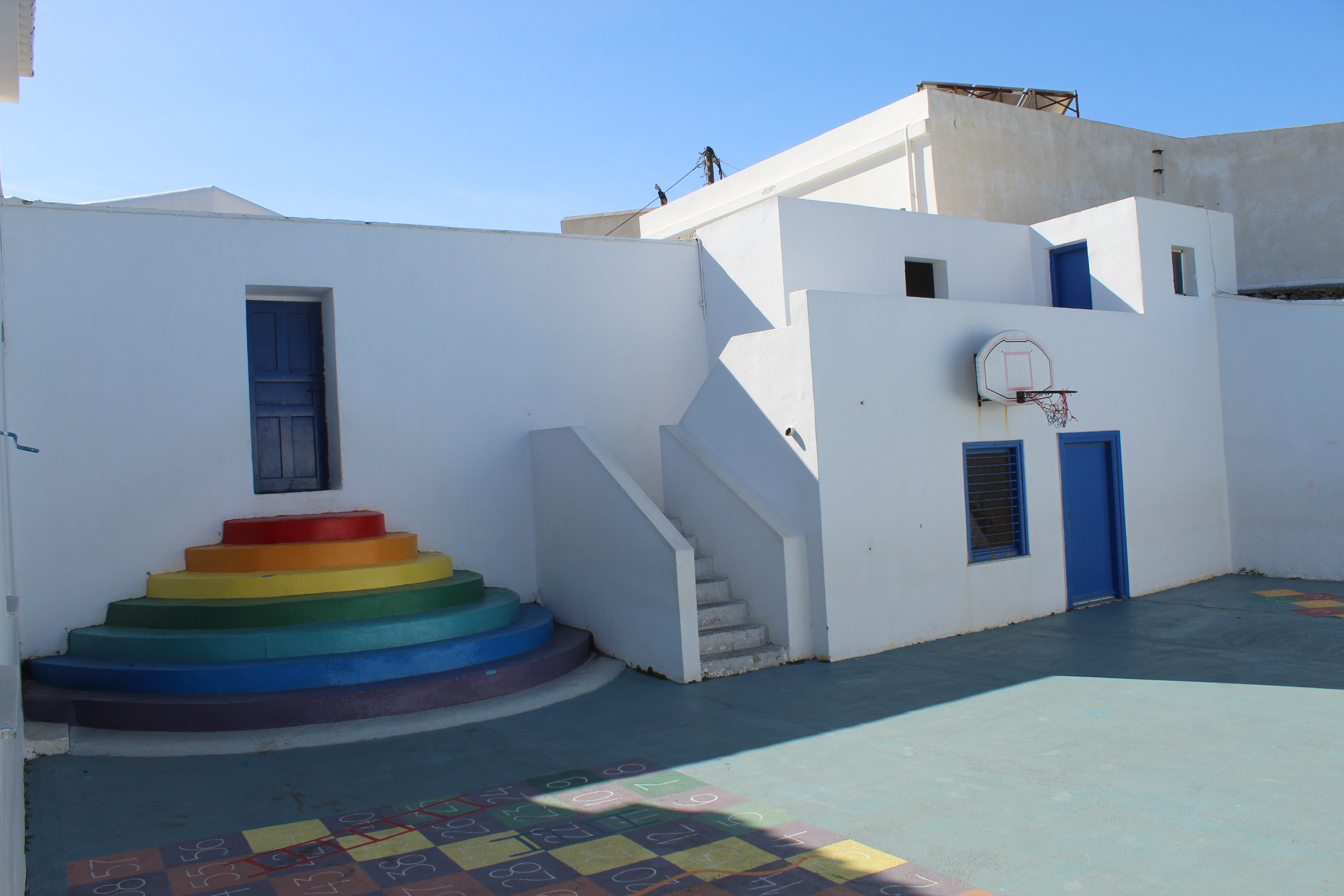
The schoolyard of the Elementary School

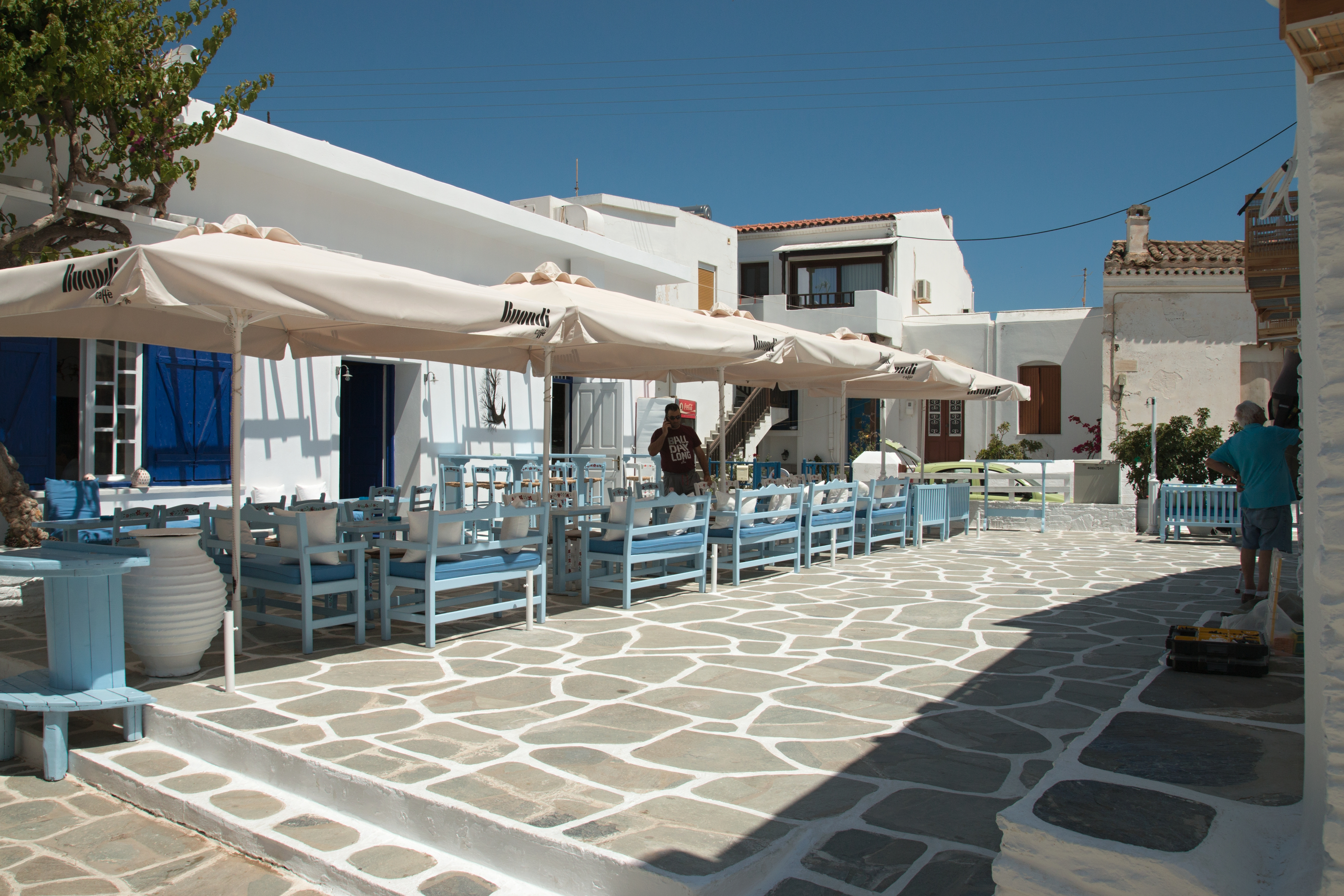
A typical alley

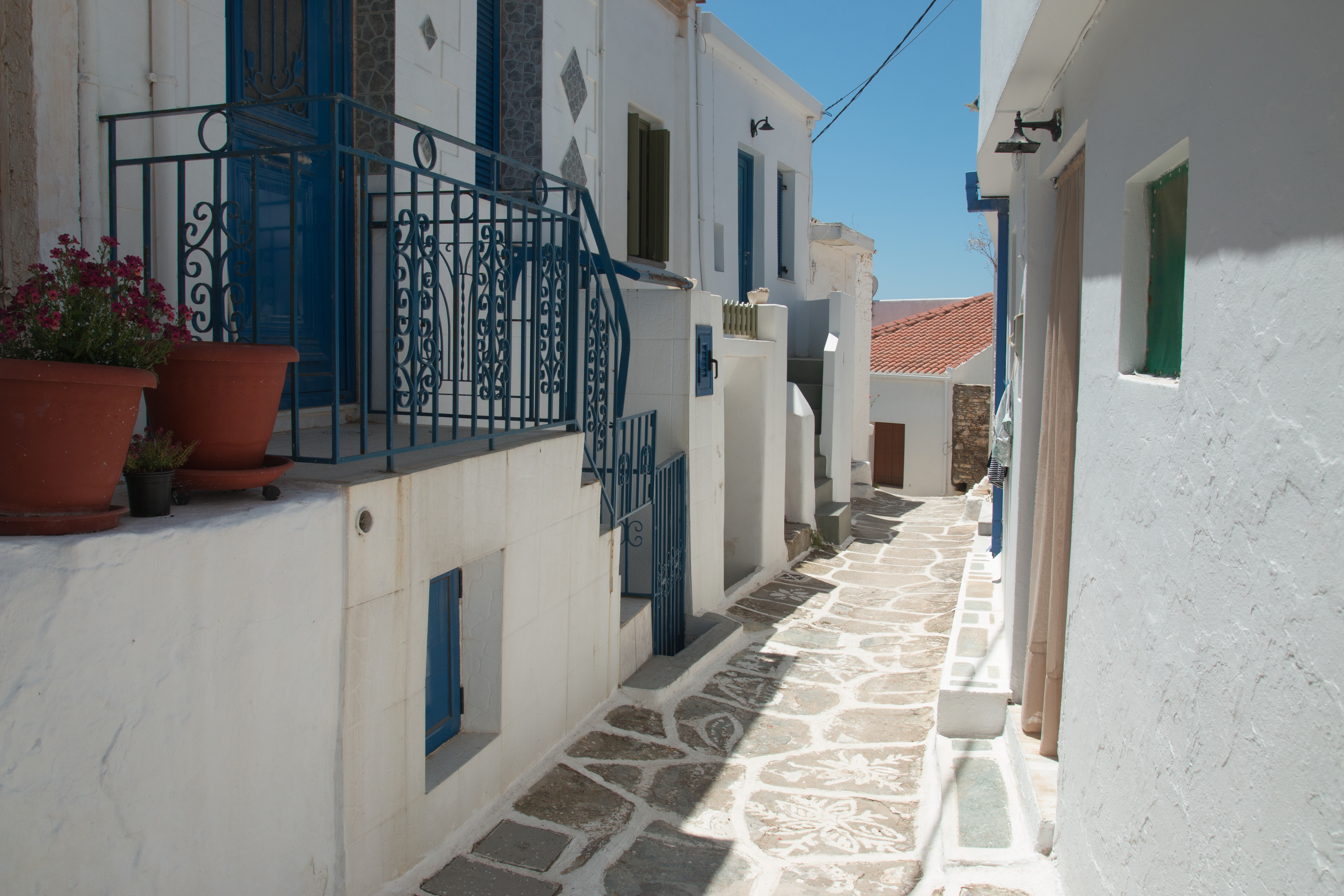
A typical alley

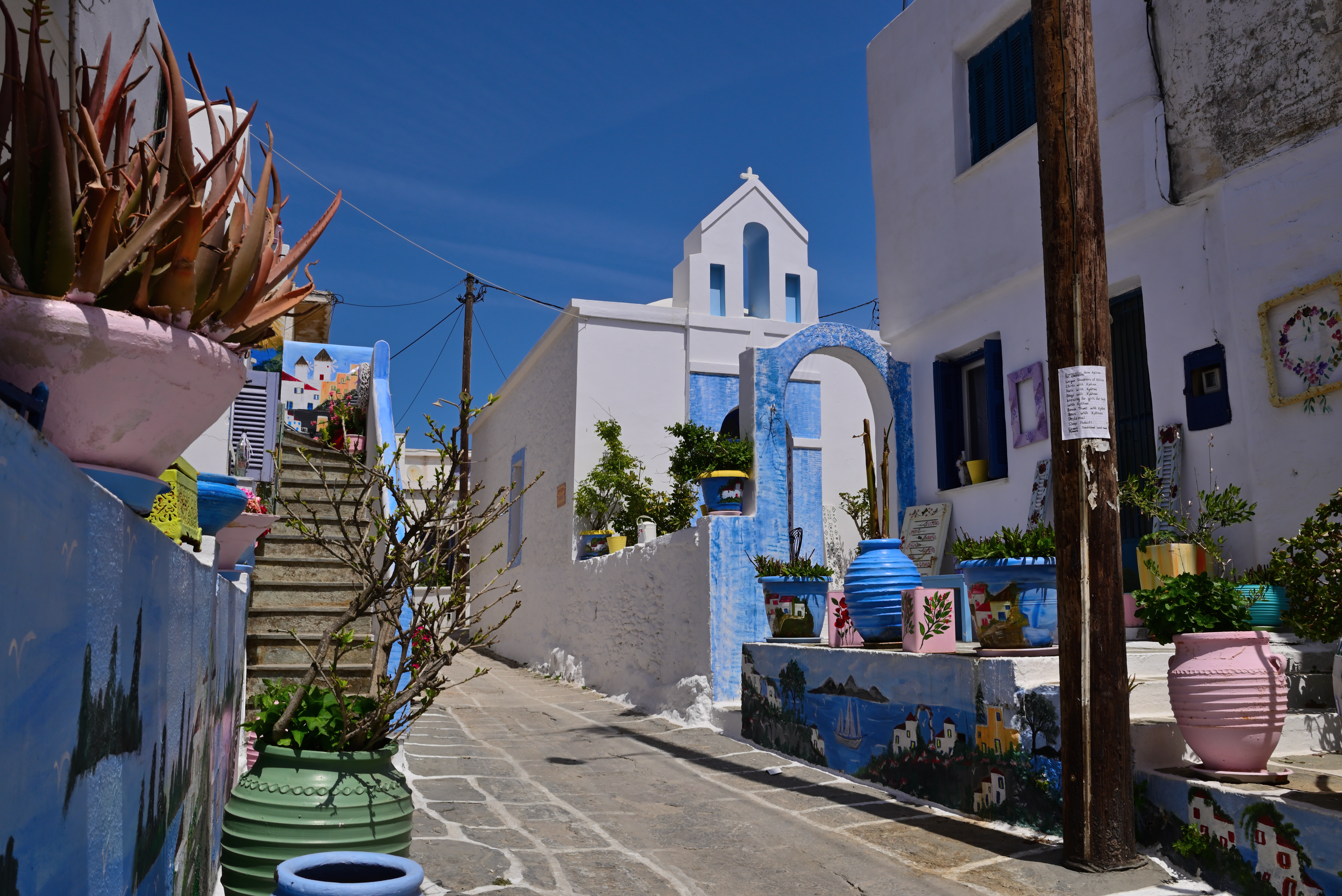
Alley in Chora

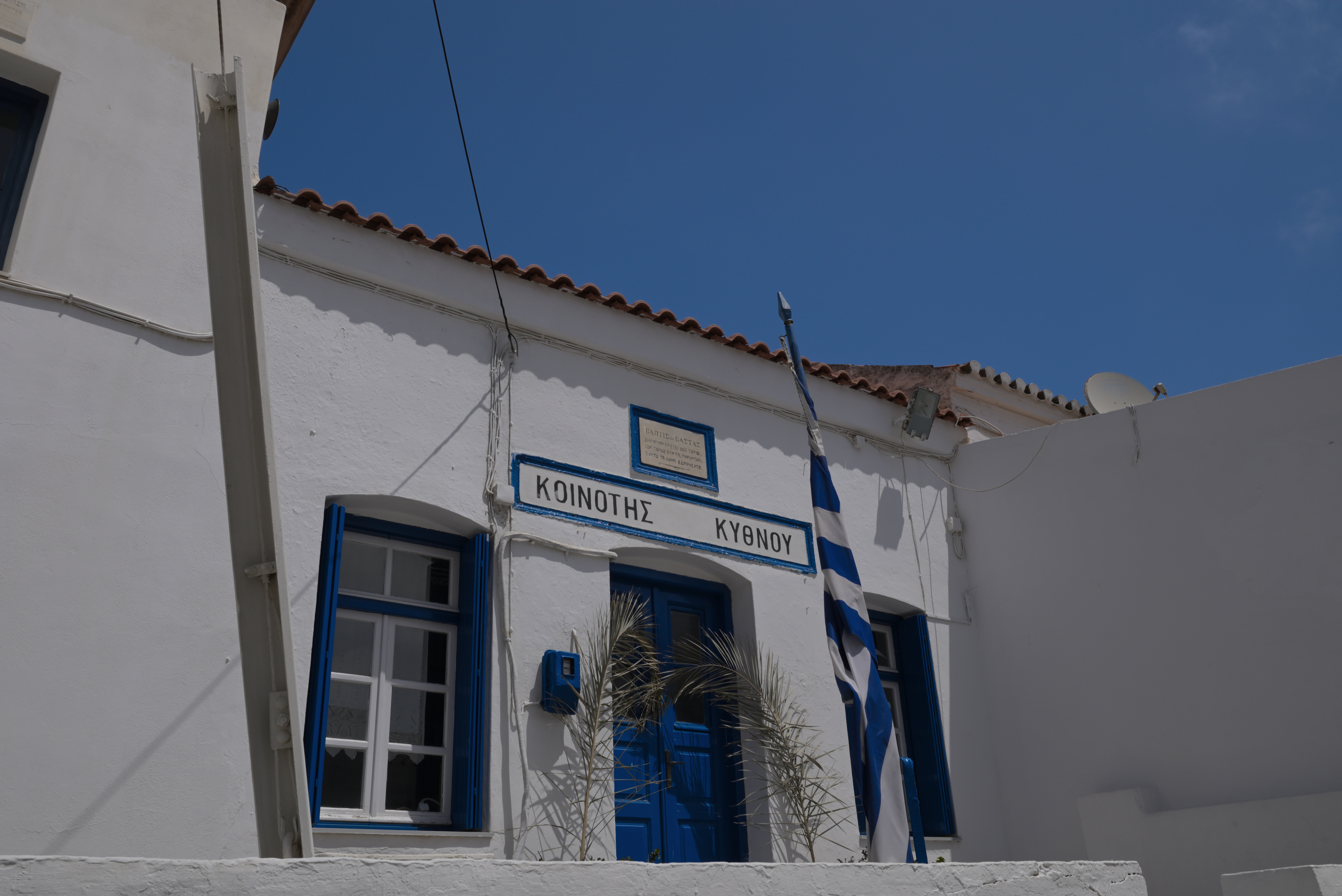
An old public building

== Bibliography ==
- Stelios Hiliadakis, Κύθνος, Εκδόσεις Μαθιουδάκη.
- A. Mazarakis Ainian, Αρχαία Κύθνος. Ιστοριογραφία και αρχαιολογικές έρευνες, στο Μενδώνη, Λ. Γ., Μαζαράκης Αινιάν, Α. Ι., επιμ. (1998). Κέα – Κύθνος: ιστορία και αρχαιολογία: πρακτικά του Διεθνούς Συμποσίου Κέα – Κύθνος, 22-25 Ιουνίου 1994. Αθήνα: Εθνικό Ίδρυμα Ερευνών / Κέντρο Ελληνικής και Ρωμαϊκής Αρχαιότητος, σσ. 49–63.
- Stathis I. Meneidis, Νησιώτικα, Έκδοση Συνδέσμου Κυθνίων, Αθήνα 1991.
- Giorgis Venetoulias, Του νησιού μου: παραδόσεις της Κύθνου, Εν Πλω, Αθήνα 2018
