= Church of Saint John the Theologian, Kythnos =

Church on the island of Kythnos, Greece

Coordinates: 37°24′44″N 24°25′53″E

Saint John the Theologian
- Άγιος Ιωάννης Θεολόγος
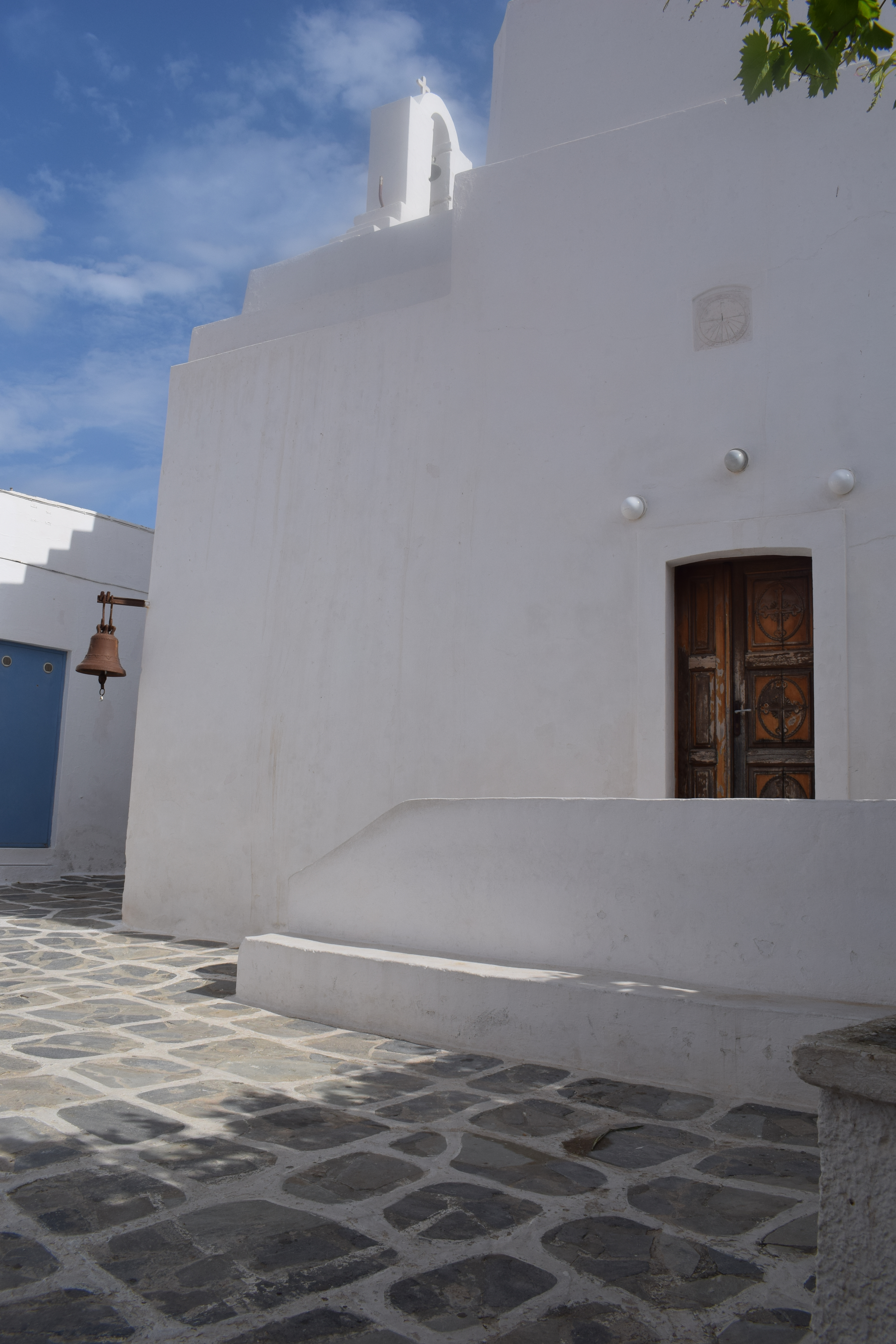

Religion
- Affiliation: Greek Orthodox
- District: South Aegean
- Patron: Saint John the Theologian

Location
- Location: Chora, Kythnos

Saint John the Theologian (Greek: Άγιος Ιωάννης Θεολόγος) is a Greek Orthodox church and a historical monument located in Chora, on the island of Kythnos, Greece. The church is dedicated to John the Evangelist.

== Location and description ==
The church is located in the neighbourhood of Panochori, near Mazarakis Square in Chora. It is a typical example of the church architecture of Kythnos and it has been classified as a historical monument. The church is of Byzantine style with a one-room cruciform with a cupola, a wooden carved altar, frescoes and post-Byzantine icons. On the south exterior side, above the south entrance, there is a wall-mounted sundial.

The church was renovated in 1846 at the expenses of the priest and teacher Georgios Aisopidis and it was decorated with frescoes. The church was also enriched with vessels of Russian ecclesiastical art, at the expenses of the priest Meletios Vayanellis, who was a local living that time in Kiev. There church also has two icons of the artist Dimitrios Halkiotis: one depicts the Apocalypse of St. John, who is in a state of devotion. The other icon represents Virgin Mary with Jesus in her arms, Elizabeth, John, St. Anne and Mary. Jesus, Mary and John are represented as children. The main features of this icon are that the Saints are not sitting on a throne, as is customary, but are walking. The icon is characterized by its vivid colors.

== Bibliography ==
- Gounaris, Antonios (1938). Η Κύθνος. Athens: Σύνδεσμος Δρυοπιδέων.
