= Church of Saint Minas =

Greek Orthodox church in Kythnos, Greece

Coordinates: 37°23′04″N 24°25′55″E

Agios Minas
- Άγιος Μηνάς
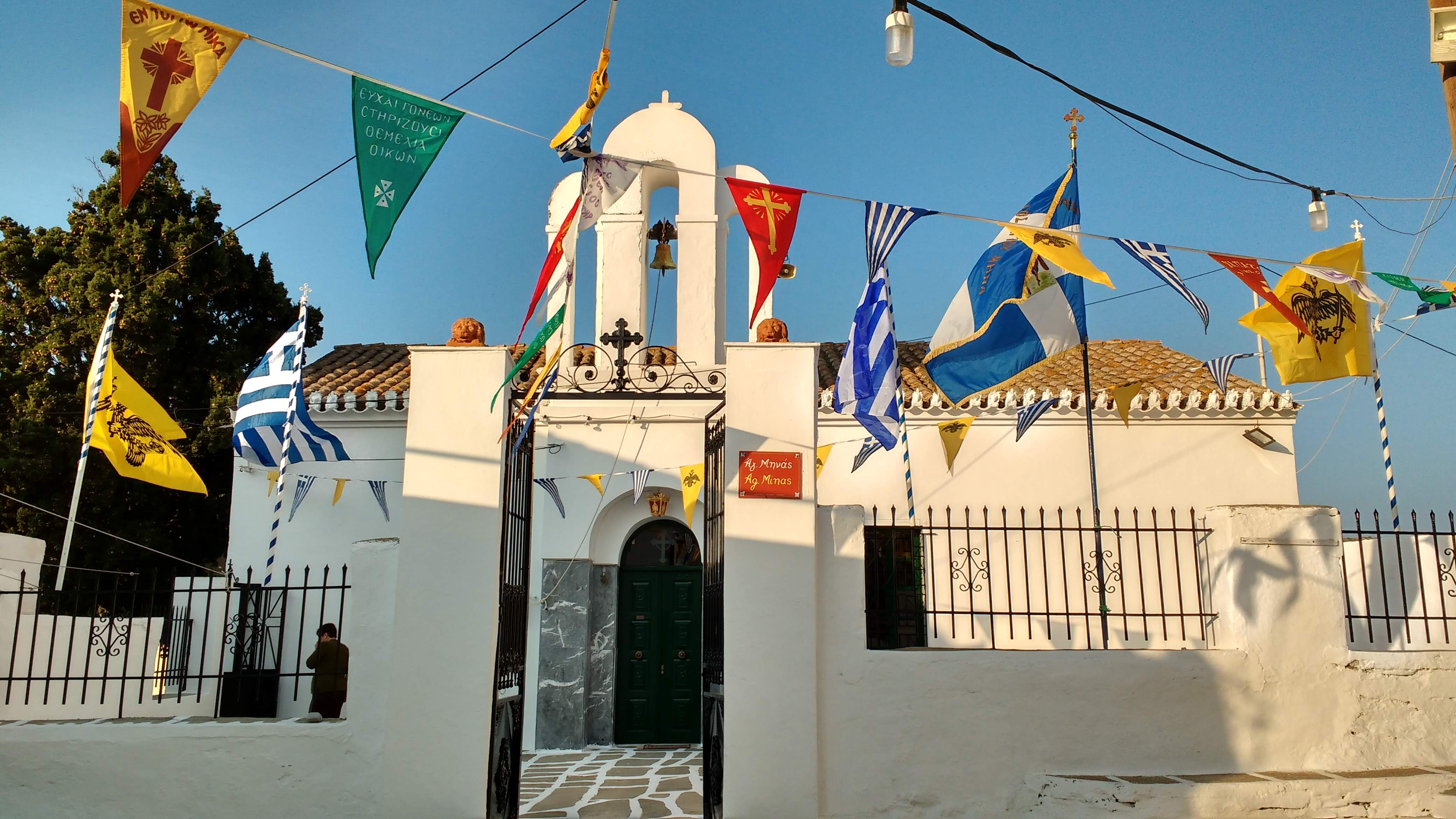

Religion
- Affiliation: Eastern Orthodox Church
- Patron: Saint Menas

Location
- Location: Dryopida, Kythnos
- Municipality: Kythnos
- Country: Greece

Architecture
- Type: Greek Orthodox Architecture

Saint Minas or Agios Minas (Greek: Άγιος Μηνάς) is a Greek Orthodox church and a protected monument in Greece. It is located in the village of Dryopida in Kythnos, Cyclades and it is dedicated to Saint Menas.

== Location and description ==
Saint Minas is located in the neighbourhood of Galatas. It is a single-aisled, tile-roofed church with a two-pitched roof. It has a wooden carved altarpiece, whose largest part is intricate and of old construction and is supplemented with newer additions at the extremities. It is thought to have been transferred to Saint Minas from another smaller church and is in good condition. The interior of the church still contains an ornate epitaphios and despotic throne.

In 1987 Saint Minas church has been classified by the Greek Ministry of Culture as a monument of the Byzantine/post-Byzantine period. The feast of the church is held on November 11, and the celebration is accompanied by a traditional festival.

== Bibliography ==
- Agnantopoulou, Evangelia (2020). Wood in the cultural heritage of the Cyclades Islands: species, uses, protection. Thessaloniki: Aristotle University Of Thessaloniki (AUTH), Thesis.
