= Church of Saint Savvas, Kythnos =

Greek Orthodox church on the island of Kythnos, Greece

Coordinates: 37°24′45″N 24°25′45″E

Church of Saint Savvas
- Εκκλησία Αγίου Σάββα
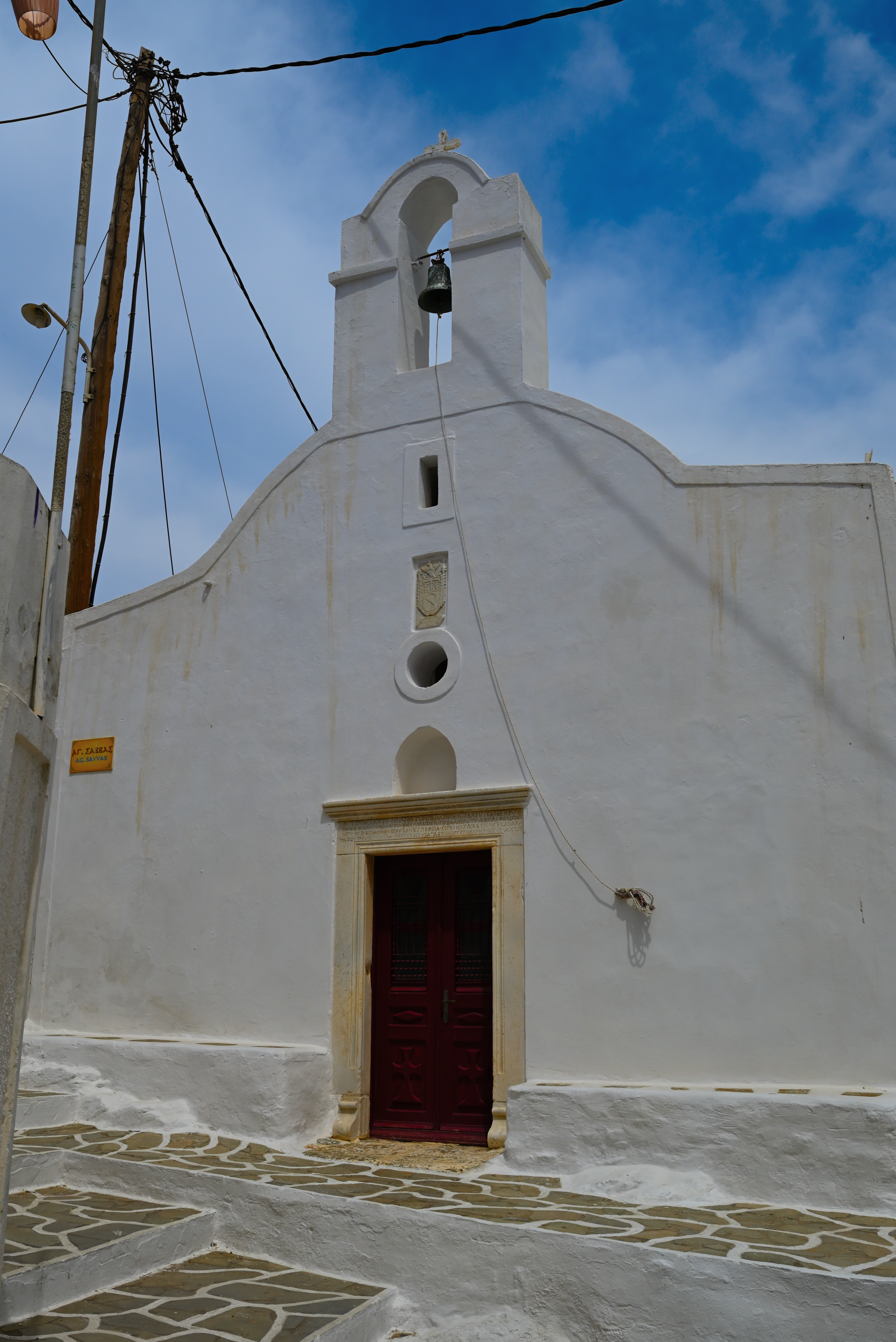

Religion
- Affiliation: Greek Orthodox
- District: South Aegean
- Patron: Sabbas the Sanctified

Location
- Location: Chora, Kythnos

The Church of Saint Savvas (Greek: Άγιος Σάββας) is a Greek Orthodox church and a historical monument located in Chora, on the island of Kythnos, Greece. The church is dedicated to Sabbas the Sanctified.

== Location and description ==
The church of Agios Savvas is located in Chora, Kythnos. Its construction dates back to the early 17th century. It was built at the expenses of Antonios Gozzadinos and bears on the outer façade an inscription dated 1613 with the coat of arms of the Venetian house of Gozzadini, of which the founder was a descendant. Saint Savvas is a single-aisled, vaulted church with a well-preserved wooden carved altarpiece dating back to around 1640, that seems to have been made specifically for this church.

In 1987 the church has been classified by the Greek Ministry of Culture as a historical monument of the Byzantine/post-Byzantine period. According to the Greek Orthodox Calendar of saints, a celebration dedicated to Saint Savvas takes place every 5 December, which is accompanied by local feast.

== Bibliography ==
- Agnantopoulou, Evangelia (2020). Wood in the cultural heritage of the Cyclades Islands: species, uses, protection. Thessaloniki: Aristotle University Of Thessaloniki (AUTH), Thesis.
- Βάλληνδα, Αντωνίου (1882). Κυθνιακά ήτοι της νήσου Κύθνου χωρογραφία και ιστορία μετά του βίου των συγχρόνων Κυθνίων εν ω ήθη και έθη και γλώσσα και γένη κλπ. Εν Ερμουπόλει: Τυπ. της "Προόδου".
