= Dryopida =

Dryopida Δρυοπίδα
- Community
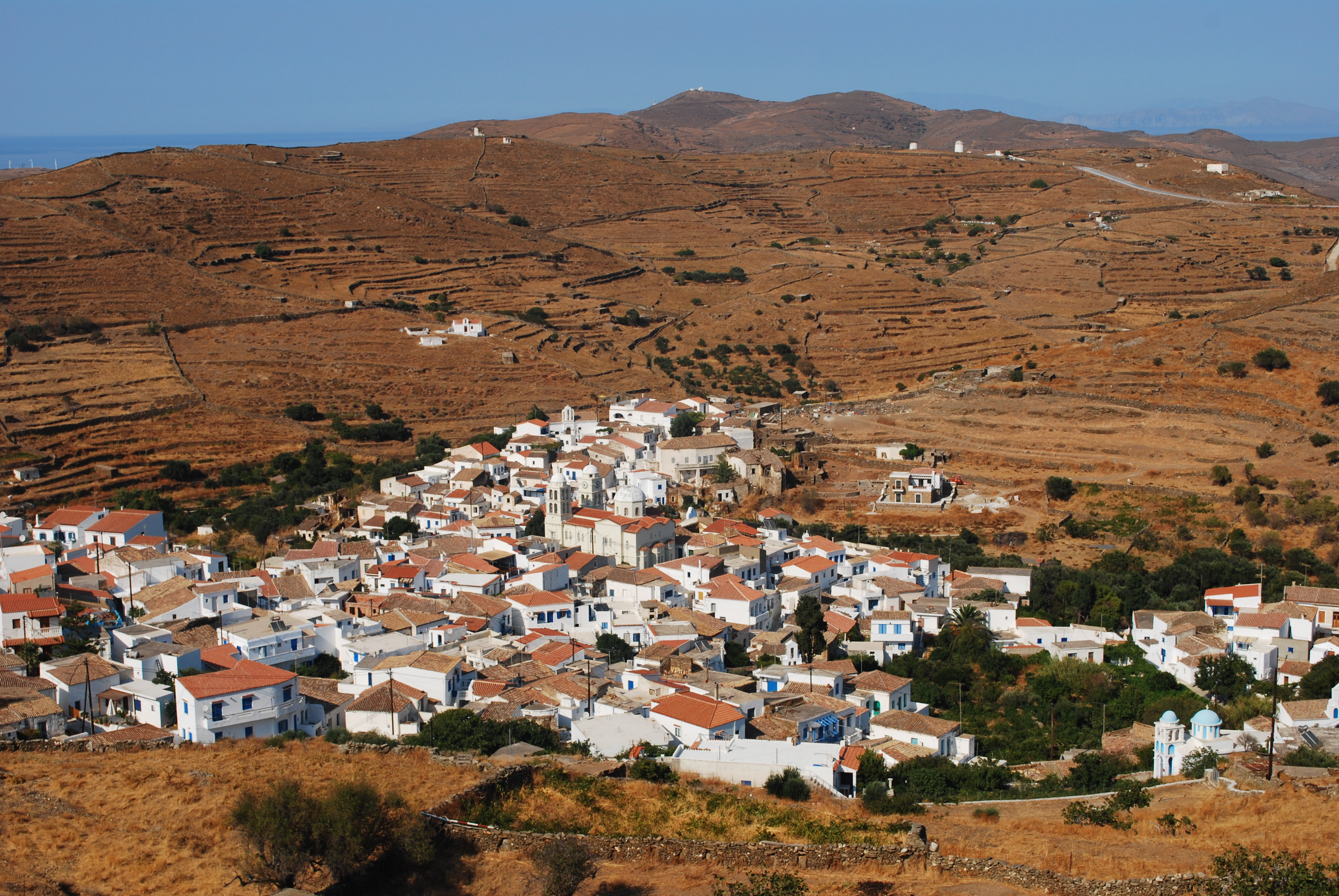
- View of Dryopida

- Location within Greece
- Coordinates: 37.383°N 24.431°E
- Country: Greece
- Administrative region: South Aegean
- Regional unit: Kea-Kythnos
- Municipality: Kythnos

Population (2021)
  - Community: 854
- Time zone: UTC+2 (EET)
  - Summer (DST): UTC+3 (EEST)
- Website: www.kythnos.gr

Dryopida (Greek: Δρυοπίδα) is a village and a community in Kythnos island, Greece. It most likely got its name from the first residents of the island, the Dryopes. It is declared as a traditional settlement because of its architecture. The community has an estimated 854 inhabitants, according to the 2021 census.

== General Information ==
Dryopida is located on the Southern part of the island, at an approximate distance of 7 kilometers from Chora. It is built between two hills at an elevation of 190 meters.

The main characteristic of this community are the tiled ceramic roofs, which can be mainly traced back to the occupation of its inhabitants, tilers and roofers in Athens who brought back the custom of roofing to their place of birth.

Administratively Dryopida was part of the province of Kea but in 1997, as part of the Kapodistrias Plan administrative reform it became part of the municipality of Kythnos and remained there after the implementation of the Kallikratis Plan which reorganized Greece’s administrative divisions.

Dryopida is home to the three older classes of the elementary school of Kythnos. The village has an open-air theater, called Little Theater of Dryopida and the island’s regional multipurpose medical center.

== History ==
Dryopida was established at an unspecified time period and became the home for Cretan refugees. According to local tradition it was built as a hideaway from the pirates. It was first called Syllakas or Chorio (the Greek word for village) but was later renamed to Dryopida, the ancient name of Kythnos, named after Dryopes considered the first inhabitants of the island. The locals refer to it often by its old names and its inhabitants are called Syllakotes.

Dryopida has been cited in 1700 by French Jesuits on their missions to the Aegean Sea. Later on many explorers visited and reported on the village as well. Dryopida experienced a boom in the art of ceramics and roof tiles and iron was being mined in the Katafyki cave.

== Sightseeings ==
Dryopida is home to the Kythnos Folklore Museum exhibiting costumes, tools and other objects of daily life. There is also a small Byzantine Museum located within the Church of Saint George and an Agricultural Museum. An important attraction is the Saint Minas church with a wood-carved iconostasis and old icons. The Katafyki Cave is located in Fires and has stalactites and stalagmites. In the Antiquity it operated as an iron mine. After the founding of the Greek state, the mining was reinstated. Throughout the ages the cave has also served as a refuge and a food storage area as well as a place of celebration.

== Gallery ==
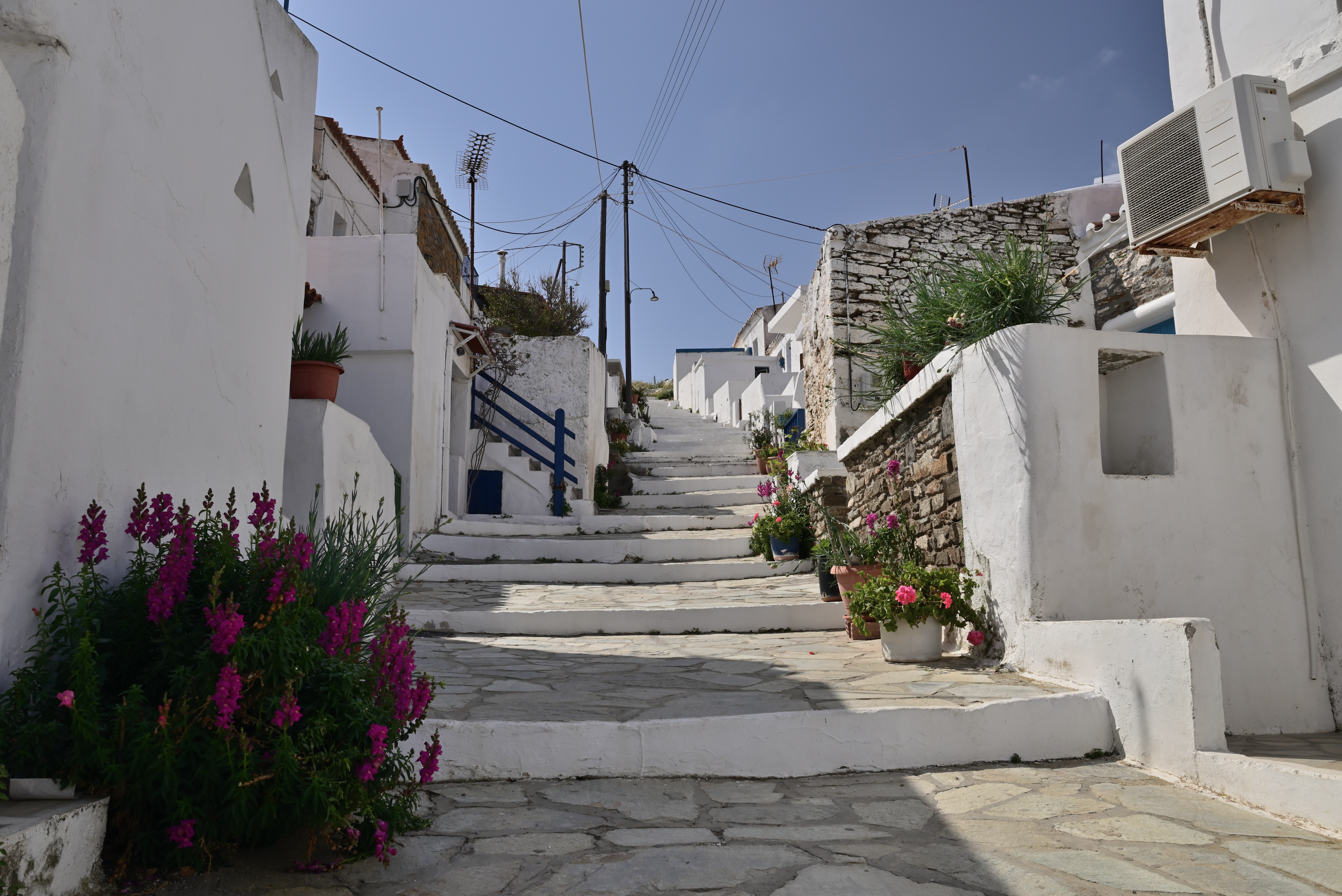
Steps decorated with plants

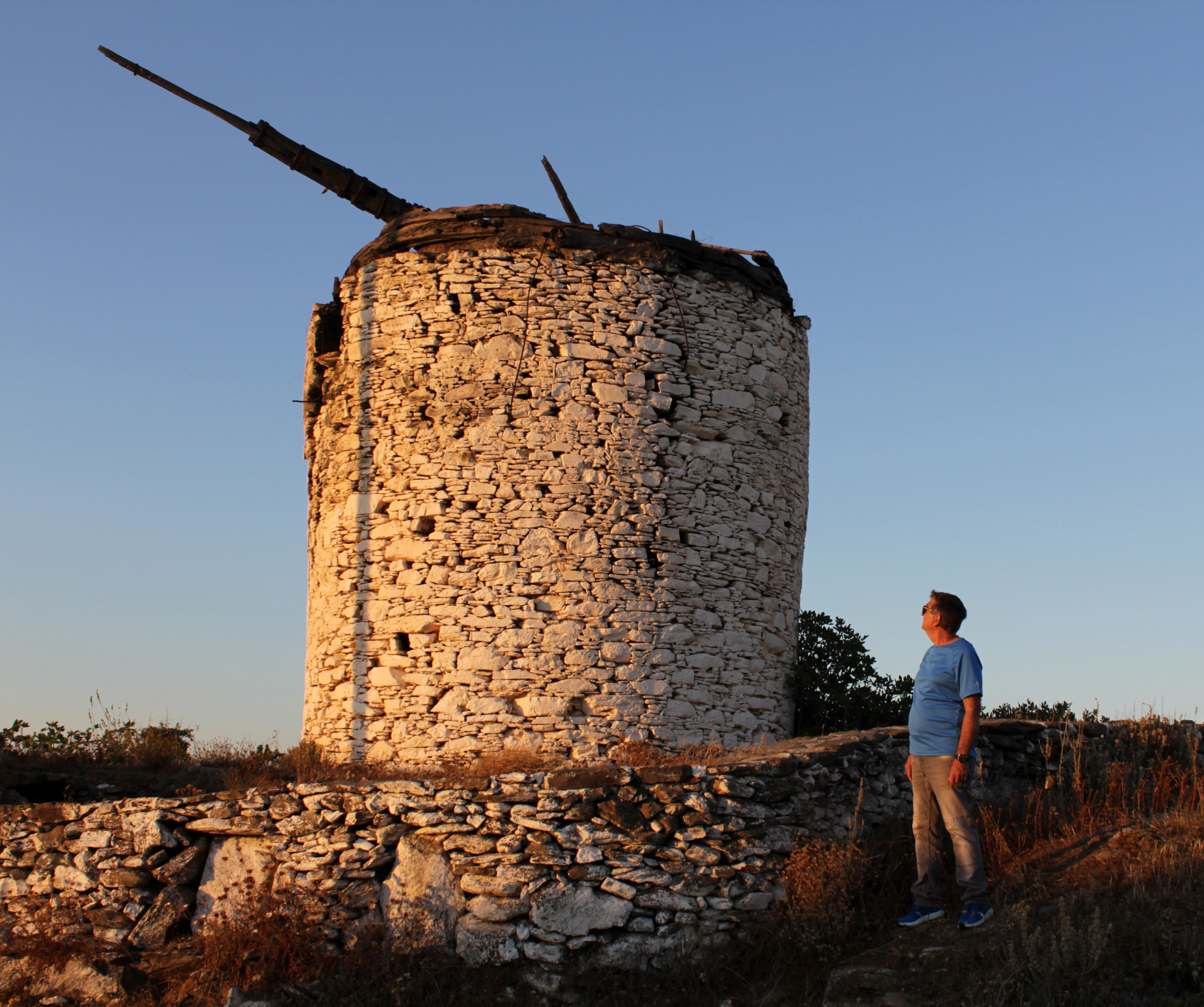
Windmill

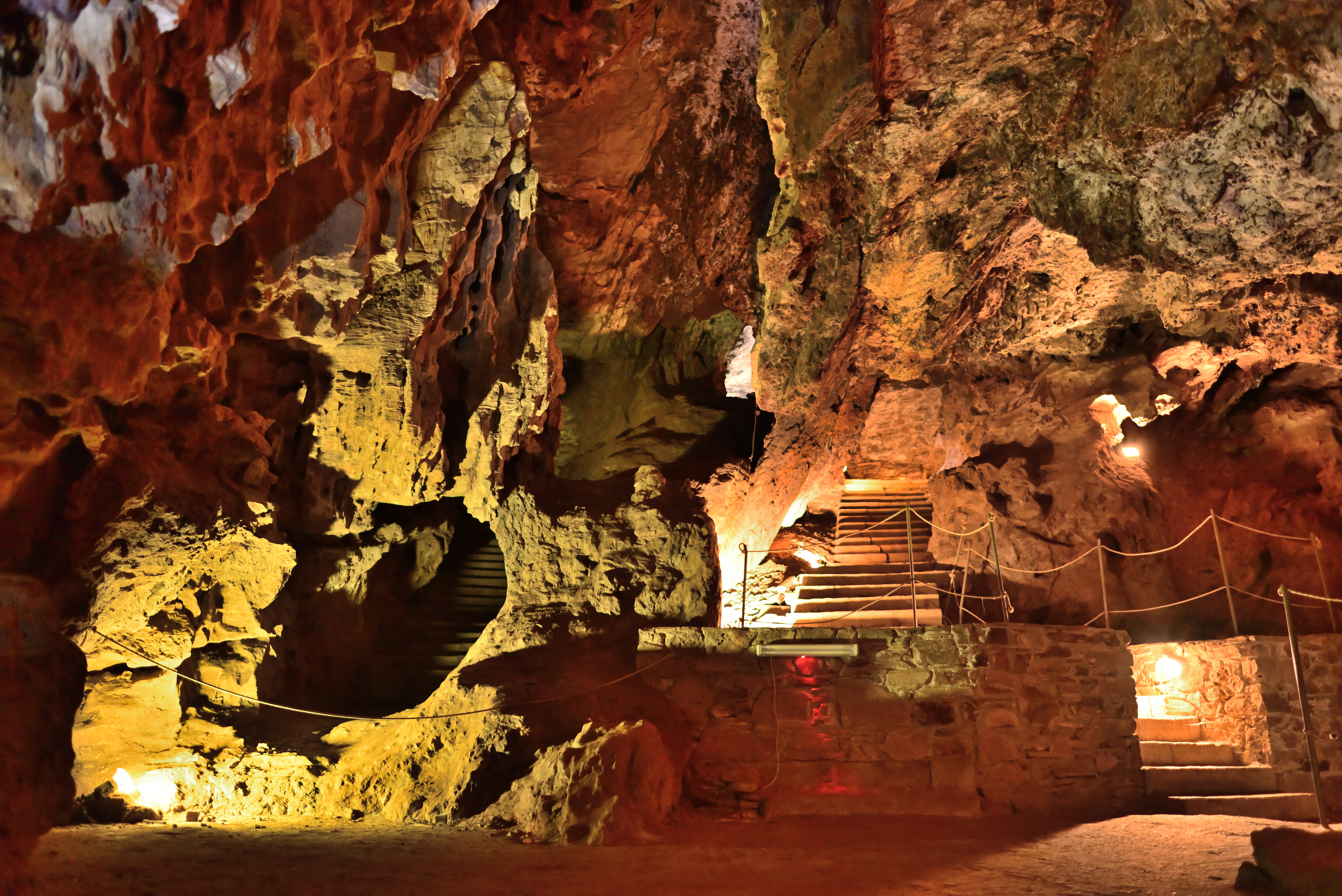
Inside Katafyki Cave

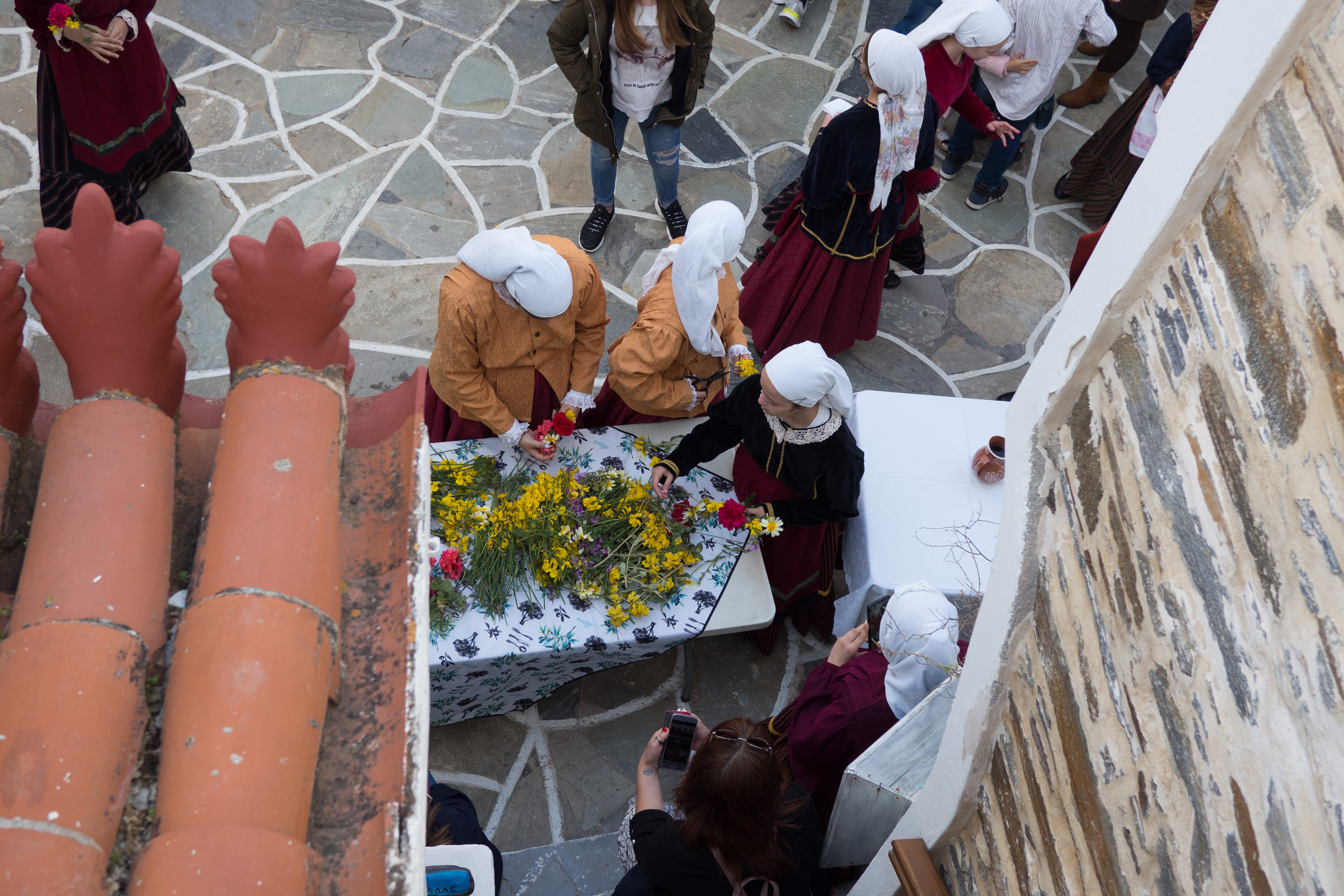
Traditional May Feast in Dryopida

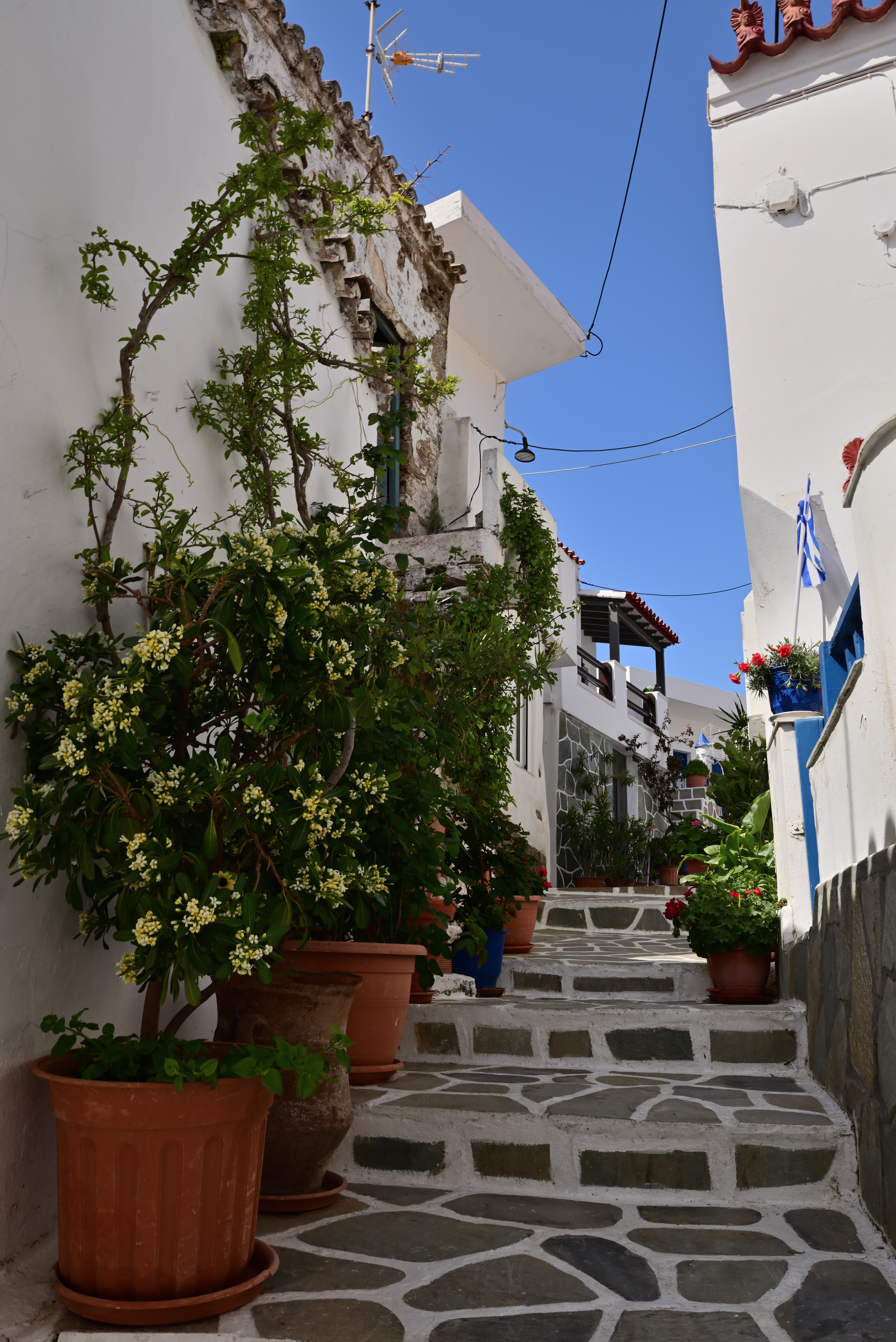
Alley

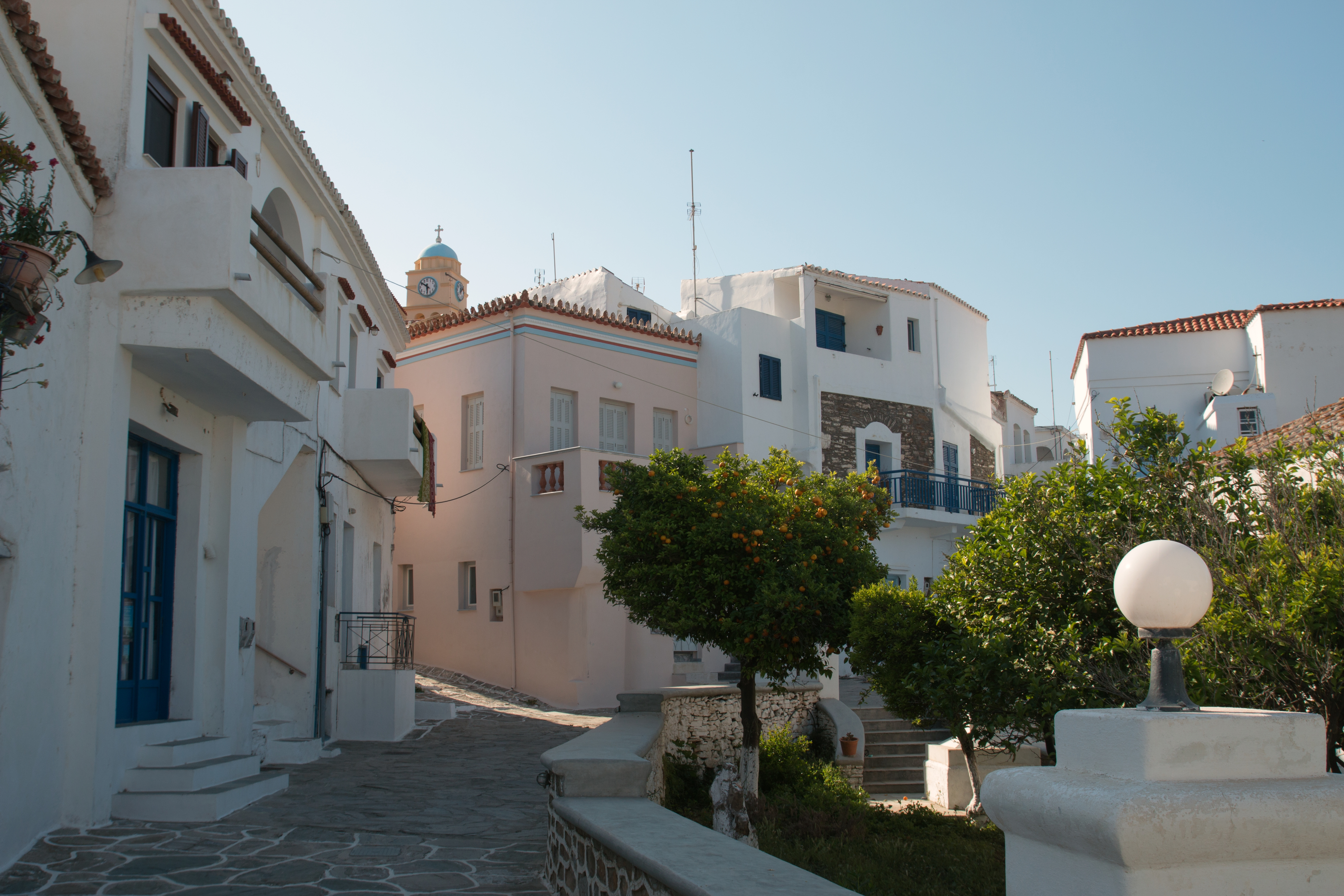
Small street near Theatraki

== Bibliography ==
- Roussos-Milidonis, Markos N., Ιησουίτες του 17ου και 18ου αιώνα περιγράφουν το Αιγαίο, Εκδόσεις Δήμου Άνω Σύρου, Athens 1989.
- Venetoulias, Giorgis, Τα κεραμικά της Κύθνου, Enplo Editions, 2004.
- Venetoulias, Giorgis, Του νησιού μου, Παραδόσεις της Κύθνου, Enplo Editions, 2018.
