= Regina Silveira =

Brazilian artist (born 1939)

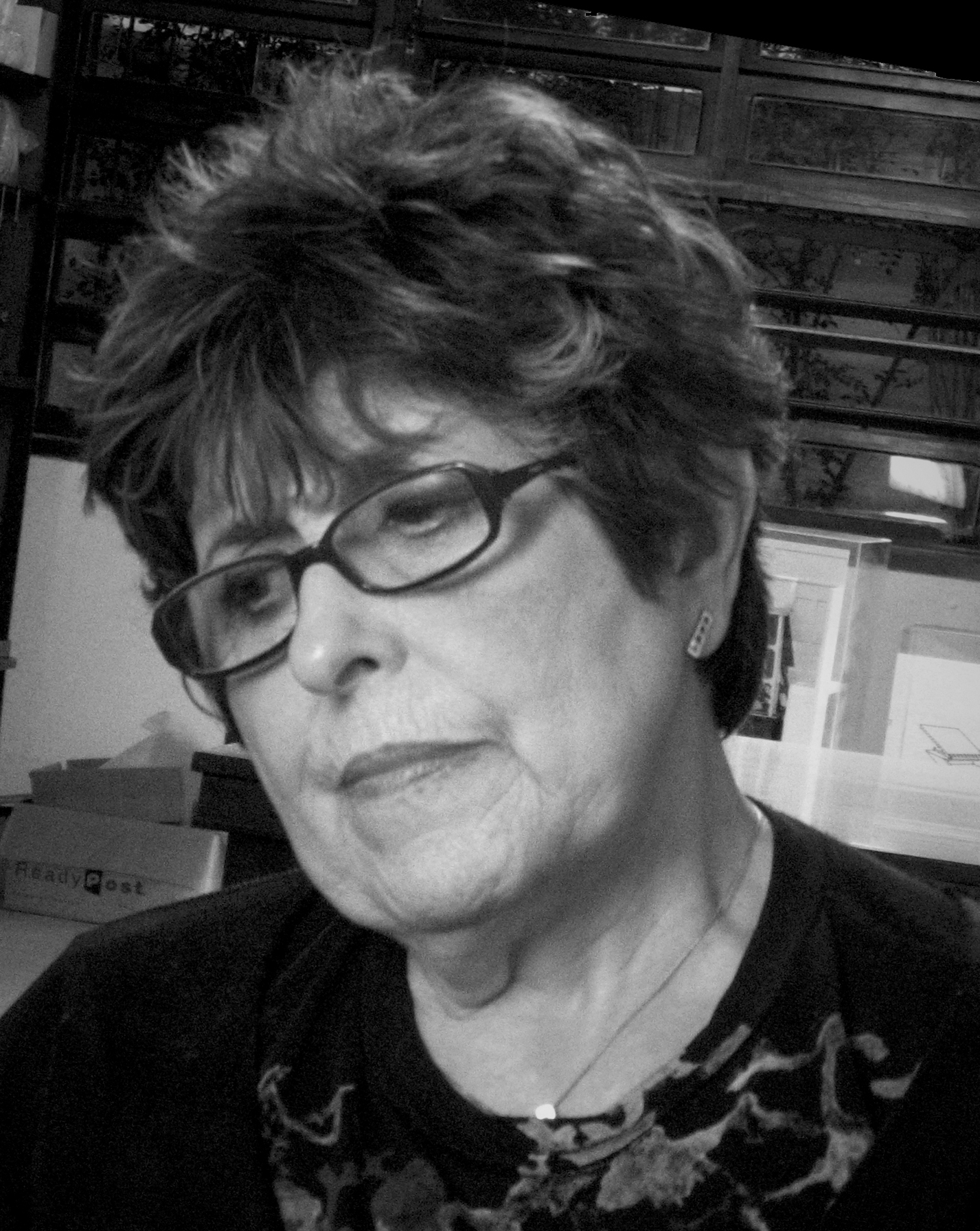
- Born: 1939 (age 86–87); Porto Alegre, Brazil
- Education: Universidade Federal do Rio Grande do Sul; University of São Paulo
- Occupation: artist

Regina Silva Silveira (born 1939) is a Brazilian artist known for her work with light, shadows and distortions exploring ideas of reality. Silveira has used many media throughout her career but focuses mainly on videography, painting, and printmaking (including some lithography.) She is based in São Paulo.

== Early life ==
Silveira was born in 1939 in Porto Alegre, Brazil, but has spent much of her life in the city of São Paulo. She began studying art in 1950 under Brazilian painter Iberê Camargo; she studied lithography and woodcut in addition to painting. In the 1970s, she began experimenting with printmaking and video.

== Education ==
Regina graduated in 1958 with a degree in fine arts from the Arts Institute of the Universidade Federal do Rio Grande do Sul. Occupying a teaching position in the same institution, she developed a sculpture and painting practice under the tutelage of Iberê Camargo, Francisco Stockinger and Marcelo Grassmann. In 1967 she was awarded a scholarship to study art history in Madrid. She returned to Brazil in 1973, continuing her studies at University of São Paulo's School of Communication and Arts, completing her Master of Fine Arts degree in 1980 and a PhD from the same institution in 1984.

== Employment ==
Regina Silveira held positions at many universities throughout her career. The first was at the Arts Institute of the Universidade Federal do Rio Grande do Sul, an institution from which she graduated with her Bachelor of Fine Arts from 1964 until 1969. From there she took a position at the University of Puerto Rico on the Mayagyeaz Campus from 1969 for four years until 1973 when she accepted a position at the Fundação Armando Alvares Penteado (FAAP-SP). She kept this position for just over ten years from 1973 until 1985 when she once again found a new employment opportunity. Silveira retired after a lengthy career from the Department of Plastic Arts from the School of Communications and Arts at the Universidade de São Paulo.

Silveira used virtual reality in two collaborative works, Infinities and Odisseia.

Encuentro (1991) was achieved by designing with a digital medium.

In his career she has investigated the perception of reality and what motives have visual images. Her artistic terminology contains different modes of representation in perspective, which circumscribe Skiagraphia (the study of shadows) and obtaining them from common objects to create duality and tension.

== Work: themes and processes ==
Silveira established herself as an artist during under the military dictatorship in the 1970s, creating ephemeral conceptual works such as videos, pamphlets and mail art. She "subverted expected meanings through paradox and enigma with the aim of destabilizing perception". In the 1980s she began working with skiagraphia (shadow art) in installations, creating "a disorienting experience that highlights the space between presence and absence".

Her art images use installation printmaking in conceptual ways. Silveira's early paintings were site-specific on walls, which then developed into illusions that incorporate digitally produced images in walls and rooms. Silveira has used printmaking to explore the impact of distortion with confrontational shadow images.

Silveira's work centers around the idea that there is a tension between movement and the spatial perspective of an individual, which allows her to interpret her ideas and themes in whatever format she chooses; sometimes she likes to tie in political connotations in order to give a deeper meaning to her work.

In Absentia (1983), was presented at the 17th Biennial in São Paulo. The work, two silhouettes of two of Marcel Duchamp's "readymades" filled the room with shadows in deformed perspectives missing the source of the objects with empty pedestals.

Silveira's visual vocabulary explores the Simulacros between absence and presence using shadows, footprints, and tire tracks.

Silveira has had many international installations. She is known for her novel uses of museum and gallery spaces and for her installations in empty office spaces in Houston, Texas. She also works with light, and the absence of light (shadows). Her exploration of shadow and light and how that relates to objects are implied and engulfing to the viewer. She likes how shadows are intangible and therefore are in nature a very moldable part of her work that can be intentionally distorted and allow a certain image to only be viewed when looked at from a unique angle. Her work explores whether something is present or absent. For example, Desaparencia, from YEAR, depicts an easel and stool using dotted lines which indicates that although they are present as the piece of art, they are not actually present in the scene.

Silveira is represented by the Sicardi Gallery in Houston, Texas. She resides and works in São Paulo, Brazil.

== Solo exhibitions ==
Year	Title	Venue	Location
2015	Regina Silveira: CRASH	Museu Oscar Niemeyer	Curitiba, Brazil
2014	El sueño de Mirra y otras constelaciones	Museo Amparo	Puebla, Mexico
2014	Interact: Deconstructing Spectatorship	Courtauld Institute of Art	London, UK
2013	Regina Silveira	Alexander Gray Associates	New York, NY, US
2013	Octopus	Savannah College of Art and Design Museum of Art	Savannah, Georgia, US
2011	Regina Silveira: Limits	Stanlee and Gerald Rubin Center for the Visual Arts, University of Texas	El Paso, US
2010	Tramazul	Museu de Arte de São Paulo	São Paulo, Brazil
2009	Tropel (Reversed)	Kunstmuseet Koge	Skitsesamling, Denmark
2007	Sombra Luminosa	Museo de Arte del Banco de la República	Bogotá, Colombia
2005	Lumen	Palacio de Cristal, Museo Nacional Centro de Arte Reina Sofia	Madrid, Spain
2000	Perpetual Transformation	Art Museum of the Americas	Washington, DC, US
1998	Super-Herói: Night and Day	Museo de Arte Moderno de Buenos Aires	Argentina
1992	In Absentia (Stretched): Contemporary Current Series	Queens Museum of Art	New York, US
1984	Sombras	Museu de Arte do Rio Grande do Sul	Porto Alegre, Brazil
1982	Anamorfas	Museu de Arte Moderna do Rio de Janeiro	Rio de Janeiro, Brazil
1978	Regina Silveira: Obra gráfica, 71-77	Pinacoteca do Instituto de Artes da Universidade Federal do Rio Grande do Sul	Porto Alegre, Brazil

Regina Silveira also took part in many group exhibitions such as the Bienal de São Paulo (1981, 1983, 1994, 1998), the Havana Biennial (Cuba, 1984, 1994, 2015); Brazil: Body and Soul, Guggenheim Museum (New York, 2001); the XV Bienial de Cerveira (Vila Nova de Cerveira, Portugal, 2009); Philagrafika (Philadelphia, 2010); and the XI Biennial of Cuenca (Ecuador, 2011).

== Notable exhibitions ==
Regina Silveira has hosted and contributed to over 100 exhibitions throughout her career.

In Lumen, Silveira placed a vinyl lightbulb on the façade of a glass building which was dark during the day, but had the ability to light up at night. Blue glass additions were used, casting shadows and patterns onto the floor.

Gone Wild is an exhibition which featured animal paw prints in vinyl pasted on the walls. The paw prints appear as though they begin on the floor in amorphous shapes and lead onto the walls as if an animal were actually running around the room. Many of the prints are distorted so that they can only be viewed from certain angles.

Desaparencia is a piece that is set in a barren white-walled room with cedar flooring. The walls have windows, but they are closed. Silveira took latex and using dotted lines, she outlined an artist's easel holding a piece of canvas, with a stool by its side. The easel and the stool extend from the floor up onto the walls and towards the ceiling.

In Mil E Um Dias, Silveira painted two scenes on a plain wall which also included a doorway and stairs. The two scenes included one night sky dotted with stars, and the other is a picture of a cloudy morning with sunlight peeking through.

Mundus Admirabilis features vinyl insects taking over a two-tiered room with white walls, a repeating pattern throughout Regina's work – white walls with black vinyl patterns.

== Scholarships obtained ==
- 1993 Pollock-Krasner Foundation
- 1994 Fulbright Program

== Collections ==
- Celeção Itaú, São Paulo, Brazil
- Celeção SECS, São Paulo, Brazil
- Contemporary Art, La Jolla, CA, US
- Museum of Contemporary Art San Diego
- Museum of Modern Art, New York
- Pinacoteca do Estado de São Paulo
- Foundation for Contemporary Performance Arts, New York, NY, US
- Blanton Museum of Art, University of Texas, Austin, TX, US
- Museo de Arte Contemporânea de Buenos Aires, Argentina
- Museu de Arte Moderna do Rio de Janeiro, Brazil
- Museu de Arte Moderna de São Paulo, Brazil
- Museo del Barrio, New York, NY, US
- Taipei Fine Arts Museum, Taiwan
- Queens Museum of Art, New York, NY, US

== Awards ==
In recent years, Regina Silveira has won several awards for her work. This list is not exhaustive, but includes many awards between the years of 1983 and 2013.

- 1985 Bolsa de Pesquisa, Conselho Nacional de Pesquisa, Brazil
- 1987 Bolsa de Pesquisa, Conselho Nacional de Pesquisa, Brazil
- 1988 Melhor Instalação 1987, Associação Paulista de Críticos de Arte, São Paulo, Brazil Premio Lei Sarney à Cultura Brasileira: Gravura, Brasília, Distrito Federal, Brazil
- 1990 The John Simon Guggenheim Foundation Fellowship
- 1993 Art Studio Grant, The Banff Centre, Banff, Canada Pollock-Krasner Foundation Grant, New York, NY
- 1994 Fulbright Foundation, Washington, DC
- 1996 Civitella Ranieri Foundation Fellowship, Civitella Ranieri Center, Umbertide, Italia
- 2000 Gran Premio Del Grabado Latinoamericano: Medalla de Oro, Primera Bienal Argentina de Gráfica Latinoamericana, Buenos Aires, Argentina Prêmio Cultural Sergio Motta para Arte e Tecnologia, Voto Popular, São Paulo, Brazil
- 2004 Claraluz, Melhor Exposição do Ano, Associação Paulista de Críticos de Arte, São Paulo, Brazil
- 2007 Mundus Admirabilis, Prêmio Bravo de Artes Plásticas, São Paulo, Brazil
- 2011 Tramazul, Great Art Critics Award, São Paulo Art Critics Association, São Paulo, Brazil
- 2012 Award for Life and Work, Brazilian Art Critics Association, Brazil
- 2013 Prêmio pelo conjunto da obra, Prêmio MASP Mercedes-Benz, São Paulo, Brazil
