= Casa Vasari =

Casa Vasari may refer to one of two residences of the Italian architect, painter and art historian Giorgio Vasari:

- Casa Vasari, Arezzo
- Casa Vasari, Florence
