= Foliorum =

Foliorum may refer to:

- Lygisaurus foliorum, species of skink
- Microbacterium foliorum, species of bacteria
