= Apollodorus (painter) =

5th-century BC Greek painter

Apollodorus Skiagraphos (Greek: Ἀπολλόδωρος ὁ σκιαγράφος) was an influential Ancient Greek painter of the 5th century BC whose work has since been entirely lost. Apollodorus left a technique behind known as skiagraphia, a way to easily produce shadow, that affected the works not only of his contemporaries but also of later generations. This shading technique uses hatched areas to give the illusion of both shadow and volume.

== Life and accomplishments ==
Little is known about the actual life of Apollodorus, although he was catalogued by the notable historians Plutarch and Pliny the Elder. It was recorded that Apollodorus was active around 480 BCE; his dates of birth and death, however, are not attested in any surviving historical works or fragments of works. He was given different names by those who wrote about him. To Pliny, he was the great painter Apollodorus of Athens; therefore, it can be assumed that he lived and worked in the polis of Athens. But, to Plutarch and Hesychius, he was known as Apollodorus Skiagraphos, "the shadow-painter", named after his greatest legacy.

None of his actual paintings remain, for, due to weathering, almost all ancient Greek paintings have been destroyed, and the elegance and beauty of Greek art can mainly be glimpsed in the Macedonian tombs with their rich artistic programmes, in works such as the Derveni Krater, and in the sculptures and motives that were later copied by the Romans and architectural ruins that remain. The subjects of some of the paintings were recorded, however, by quite a number of ancient Greek historians. Pliny the Elder recorded two paintings, Praying Priest and Ajax Burned by Lightning, that resided in the ancient Greek city of Pergamon which was situated in modern-day Turkey. Other ancient Greek historians cited the painting Odysseus Wearing a Cap and also Heracleidae, a painting that referenced the descendants of Hercules. Also, one of his paintings was supposedly entitled Alcmena and the Daughters of Hercules Supplicating the Athenians.

As demonstrated by the titles of the paintings, it is probable that the majority of his works were similar to the other artists of the era in that their subject matter was most often based around the Greek gods and goddesses or other famous Greek citizens from historical epic poems that were passed on for generations in the oral tradition.

The topics of his paintings may have been unimaginative and common during the time period; however, it was his ingenious technique that made him such a renowned painter. One of the major artistic techniques that Apollodorus developed was called skiagraphia, or shading in English, hence his title “the shadow-painter”. The historian Plutarch recorded an inscription above one of Apollodorus' painting which read, “’Tis no hard thing to reprehend me; But let the men that blame me mend me.” In other words, “You could criticize [skiagraphia] more easily than you could imitate it”.

The type of shading applied by Apollodorus is highly sophisticated and even today people struggle to master skiagraphia. Apollodorus used an intricate way of “crosshatching and the thickening of inner contour lines as well as the admixture of light and dark tones” to show a form of perspective. Though it expanded the use of perspective in the ancient Greek world, skiagraphia was most effective in the depiction of stationary objects such as drapery, fruit, or faces; but it was ineffective in the painting of a body in action or a spatial setting for which perspective is usually used.

Another one of Apollodorus' greatest accomplishments did not have to do with his actual style or technique, but rather with the medium he chose. Apollodorus could very well have been one to the first well-known artists who painted on an easel as opposed to a wall which was the common action of the day.

== Effect on contemporaries ==
Though not much about his life is known, historians have made assumptions about Apollodorus and his works and actions through his contemporaries.

Zeuxis of Heraclea was one of Apollodorus' rivals according to Pliny. Zeuxis was tutored in the arts by Demophilus of Himera and Neseus of Thasos. At one point, Apollodorus even accused Zeuxis of stealing art techniques from others which might very well have been true because Zeuxis was also attributed with the expansion and development of Apollodorus' prized skiagraphia. Zeuxis is said to have innovated skiagraphia by “adding highlights to shading and applying subtly different colours.”

Regardless of what Zeuxis did, he was not the only painter to adapt Apollodorus' creation for his own purposes. Another painter named Parrhasius of Ephesus, also a rival of Zeuxis, helped expand skiagraphia as well. He purportedly used it in a contest against Zeuxis and won because the curtain that Parrhasius had painted looked so real that Zeuxis tried to pull it back. Whereas Zeuxis examined the technique of light and shade in skiagraphia, Parrhasius looked into the contoured lines that help express depth in a spatial way; therefore taking the meaning of skiagraphia even further.

Not only was skiagraphia prominent in Athens, but also its influence extended beyond Athens' borders into the tomb paintings of Vergina, Aineia, and Lefkadia in northern Greece and even into Seuthopolis, a city in what is now modern Bulgaria. Though scarce, some of the tomb frescoes in Seuthopolis used only a limited range of colours; however others in Vergina and Aineia used six or more colours further demonstrating the extent of the transformation of Apollodorus' skiagraphia. Skiagraphia continued to mutate and develop until the age of the Italian Renaissance when it was given a new name: chiaroscuro.

== Effect on the development of chiaroscuro ==
Apollodorus' development of skiagraphia was only the beginning of the gradual development of chiaroscuro. In Italian, chiaro means light and scuro means dark. So the two together symbolize the combination and distribution of light and dark into one to create a more lifelike image. No longer simply used for paintings on canvas of stationary objects, chiaroscuro is used in all types of art, even sculpture, frescoes, and woodcuts. Chiaroscuro is used to produce volume and relief, to unify the objects in a painting, or differentiate them from one another. The simple creation of skiagraphia led to the invention of diverse techniques that continued to be produced from the times of ancient Greece to Gothic times and then it reached its pinnacle in the Italian Renaissance in 14th century. Even today it continues to be important to artists.

In the 15th-century, chiaroscuro was described by Cennino Cennini, a famous Italian painter. He stated that the ideas of gradation between light and dark, skiagraphia, were combined with medieval techniques known as incidendo and matizando, which are a “layerings of white, brown, or black in linear patterns over a uniform colour” to indicate relief and volume. These two were previously used by monks in the illustration of religious manuscripts. The addition of these two techniques to skiagraphia was instrumental in the evolution of chiaroscuro.

Giotto, a Florentine painter, and Cimabue, Giotto's teacher, used chiaroscuro in their late Gothic painting as well, by mixing large amounts of white into the painting, therefore creating an easy transition between tones. In frescoes, mosaics, and manuscript illuminations, artists like Master Honore, a French manuscript painter, and Pietro, a painter and mosaic designer active in the Middle Ages, modelled from underneath with black and white space to create brightness in their works. In the end, Apollodorus' master creation after years of evolution transformed into something that, though it still resembled the original and served the same purpose, was new and thoroughly necessary to all great works of art.
