= Katie Baldwin =

American printmaker and academic

Katie Baldwin (born 1969, Seattle, WA) is an American printmaker and book artist specializing in mokuhanga and letterpress. Mokuhanga is the contemporary application of traditional Japanese water-based woodblock printing techniques. Baldwin was first introduced to mokuhanga as a student at the Evergreen State College, where she graduated with a BA in 1994. Baldwin's journey with letterpress began in the 90s in Olympia in a printer's garage letterpress studio and expanded when she shared a studio with Amber Bell and other doers and makers at 508 Legion Way, the origins of Community Print. Community Print continues to be a member-run, community- supported printmaking studio and creative space operating in downtown Olympia, Washington for over 25 years.

Katie Baldwin continued her study in printmaking techniques through her Masters of Fine Arts from the University of the Arts in Philadelphia, PA, graduating in 2004. She was awarded a residency at the Nagasawa Art Park in Awaji Island, Japan, funded by the Leeway Foundation Window of Opportunity Grant in 2004. This experience of learning from Japanese master carvers and printers and working alongside international artists has influenced her work to this day. Through grants such as The Center for Emerging Visual Artists Travel Grant, (2008), The Pennsylvania Council on the Arts Fellowship (2008), Stein Scholar in Book Arts (2010), and others, she has had the opportunity to travel nationally and internationally as an artist-in-residence. She served as the Victor Hammer Fellow at Wells College Book Arts Center from 2011 to 2013. During this time she worked at The Bixler Press & Letterfoundary where she learned to cast type.

Baldwin has been teaching at the University of Alabama Huntsville since 2013, where she is a Professor of printmaking and book arts. Baldwin received a Fulbright U.S. Scholar Award to conduct creative research in woodblock printmaking at the International Print Center at National Taiwan Normal University in Taipei in 2021. In 2022, she received the University Distinguished Research and Creative Achievement and Scholarly Performance Award. In 2023 Baldwin was awarded a Fellowship to attend the Ballinglen Arts Foundation Residency, supported by a South Arts Individual Artist Opportunity grant.

== Work ==
Katie Baldwin's series of work, titled Modified Landscape, is based on her experience of moving through the Taiwanese Landscape by foot and bicycle, when she was a Fulbright U.S. Scholar in 2021. Woodblocks were carved by hand and printed on mulberry papers. Works in textiles were slowly pieced and stitched by hand. This work was exhibited at National Taiwan Normal University in Taipei, the Wilson Hall Gallery at the University of Alabama Huntsville, and Impact 11 International Printmaking Conference in Bristol, UK.

There are Two Stories Here was an exhibition of works in 2012 by Katie Baldwin at The Print Center, a show made possible by special project support from the Edna W. Andrade Fund of The Philadelphia Foundation. This series was also exhibited at The Huntsville Museum of Art in 2013. This series, a poetic narrative, is deeply committed to traditional processes and the history of printmaking as craft. The color woodblock prints and letterpress were printed at Wells College in Aurora, NY.

A 5 x 5 foot unique image print by Katie Baldwin, The River Parcenta (2010), combines mokuhanga with screenprint, felted wool, spray paint, cut paper and mica, printed and published by the artist. It was installed in the exhibition Extra-Dimensional Printmaking, curated by Rebecca Gilbert at Nexus Gallery during Philagrafika in Philadelphia.

== Exhibitions ==
- wood+paper+box in your hands, Marianna Kistler Beach Museum, 2024
- Ten Years of Collaboration, Minnesota Center for Book Arts, 2024
- Sense of Space, GrayDUCK Gallery, Austin, TX, 2024
- Women of Mokuhanga, Sarah Moody Gallery of Art, University of Alabama, Tuscaloosa, AL, Curator Sarah Marshall and Doris Sung, 2023
- The World Between the Block and the Paper, Southern Vermont Art Center, 2022
- Between Worlds, Kentler International Drawing Space, 2022
- Print Out Times, Taoyuan International Print Exhibition, Taoyuan, Taiwan, 2021
- Uncommon Territory, Montgomery Museum of Fine Arts, Montgomery, AL, 2017
- Made in Alabama, Wiregrass Museum of Art, Dothan, AL, 2016
- PSBN Invitational, Campus Center Gallery, University of Hawai'i, Hilo, Hawai'i, 2016
- Due North, Icebox Project Space, Philadelphia, PA, curator Marianne Bernstein, 2014
- Emerging to Established, Philadelphia Museum of Art, Philadelphia, PA, 2008

Full Curriculum Vitae can be found here.

== Collaborations ==
Working collaboratively is an important part of Katie Baldwin's art practice. Baldwin co-founded three collaborations, the earliest being the Wood+Paper+Box collaborative in 2013. Her co-founders are Yoonmi Nam and Mariko Jesse, whom she met during the Nagasawa Art Park Japanese Woodblock Printmaking Residency in Awaji, Japan (2004). Their work was inspired by learning Mokuhanga together while they experienced living and working in a new place. Mise en Scéne, their fourth project, was commissioned by the Beach Museum for their 2023 Gift Print.

The Shift-Lab collective was founded in 2013. Baldwin worked with Denise Bookwalter, Macy Chadwick, Sarah Bryant, and Tricia Treacy to investigate and expand dialogue regarding communication, narrative, and the book. In 2024, Minnesota Center for Book Arts hosted an exhibition and workshop celebrating ten years of collaboration.

The international print collective Mokuhanga Sisters includes artists Katie Baldwin, Patty Hudak, Mariko Jesse, Kate MacDonagh, Yoonmi Nam, Natasha Norman, Mia O, Lucy May Schofield, and Melissa Schulenberg. They met between 2017 and 2019 at the Mokuhanga Innovation Laboratory in Kawaguchi-ko, Japan.

== Artist Books ==
- Work To Be Done In Winter
- Neighborhood Garden
- Storm Prediction
- Treasure
- Multiple Discovery (shift-lab collaboration)
- REF (shift-lab collaboration)
- Trace (shift-lab collaboration)
- Shift (shift-lab collaboration)
- Mise-en-scéne (wood + paper + box collaboration)
- un/fold (wood + paper + box collaboration)
- AL>CA>KS (wood + paper + box collaboration)
- wood paper box (wood + paper + box collaboration)

Full Curriculum Vitae can be found here.

== Teaching ==
Baldwin expanded her teaching curriculum at the University of Alabama Huntsville to include special topics courses such as Mokuhanga and Data Driven Art. Baldwin collaborated with Helen Parache (NASA) to develop curriculum and conduct a working seminar on data driven art for the students of two upper-division printmaking classes at UAH. Baldwin teaches short term workshops as a visiting artist at US-based universities and craft schools such as Anderson Ranch, University of Utah, University of Florida, and Women's Studio Workshop. In 2019, Baldwin and Yoonmi Nam facilitated a two-week long intensive at Mi-Lab in Japan focusing on Mokuhanga for a group of artists. Baldwin facilitated the enrichment of her students through visits from artists such as Judy Baumann, Sun Yung Kang, Yangbin Park, Tyanna Byuie.
