= Lygisaurus rimula =

Conservation status
- Least Concern (IUCN 3.1)

Scientific classification
- Kingdom: Animalia
- Phylum: Chordata
- Class: Reptilia
- Order: Squamata
- Suborder: Scinciformata
- Infraorder: Scincomorpha
- Family: Eugongylidae
- Genus: Lygisaurus
- Species: L. rimula

Binomial name
- Lygisaurus rimula Ingram & Covacevich, 1980

Synonyms
- Carlia rimula

Species of lizard

Lygisaurus rimula, the crevice rainbow-skink, is a species of skink found in Queensland in Australia.
