= Casa Vasari, Florence =

Biographical museum in Florence

Casa Vasari
- Italian: Casa Vasari
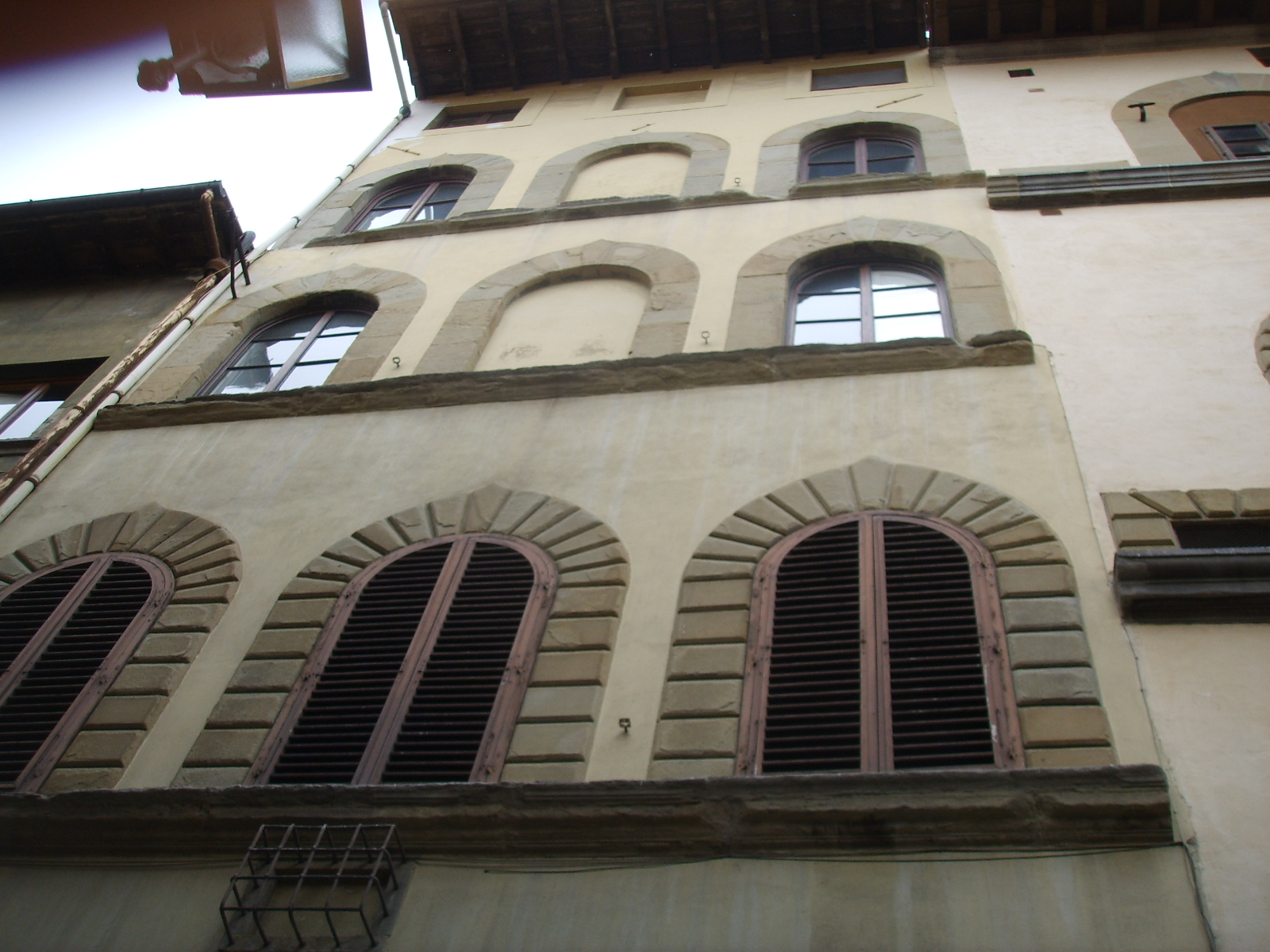
- Casa Vasari, in Florence
- Established: 2011
- Location: 8 borgo Santa Croce, Florence, Italy
- Coordinates: 43°27′38″N 11°15′14″E
- Type: Art museum

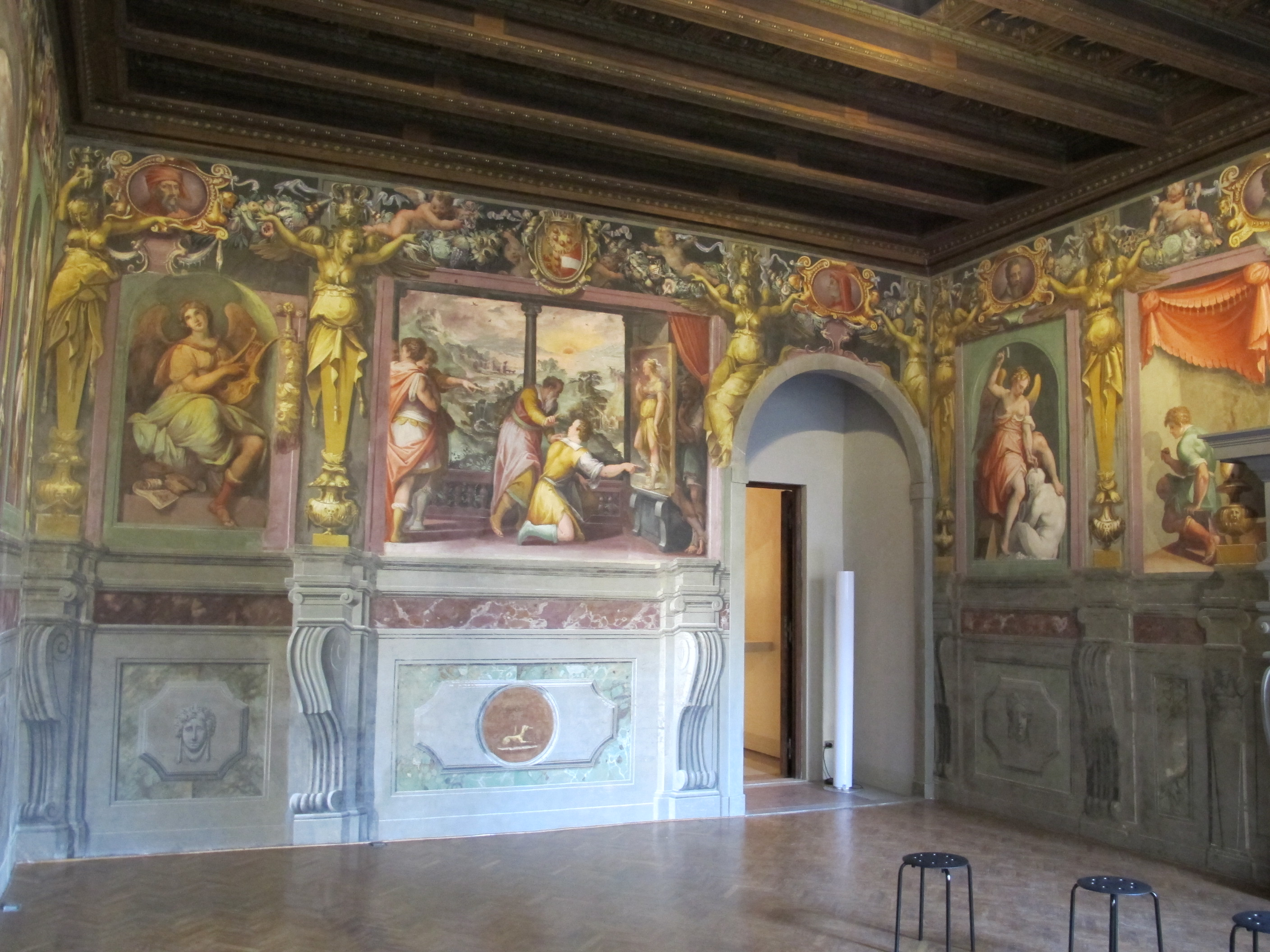
Sala Grande

The Casa Vasari is a building at 8 borgo Santa Croce in Florence, previously the residence in that city of the painter, art historian and architect Giorgio Vasari. It preserves a valuable cycle of frescoes in the hall, conceived and created by Vasari with the help of pupils.

== History ==
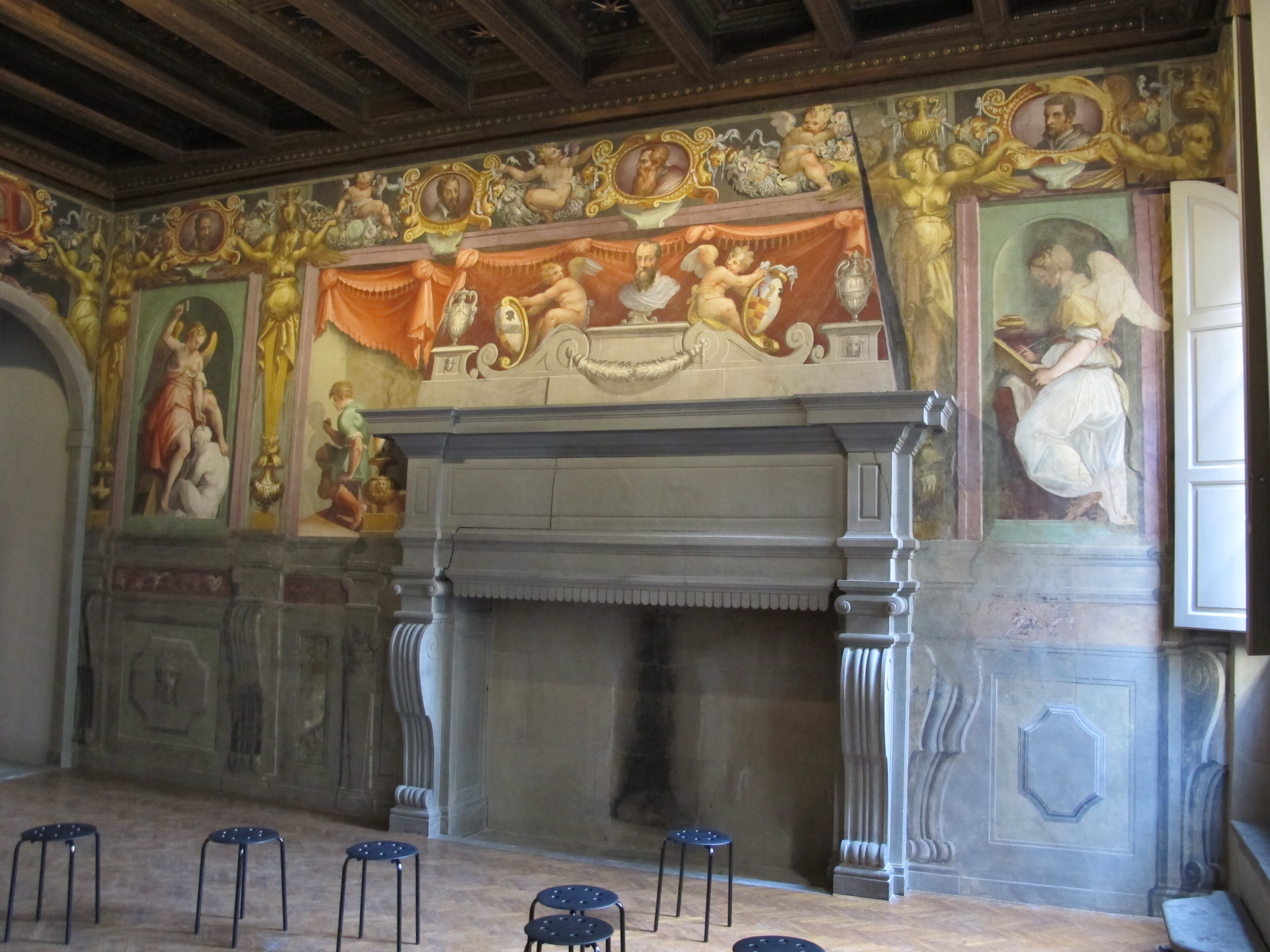
The salone

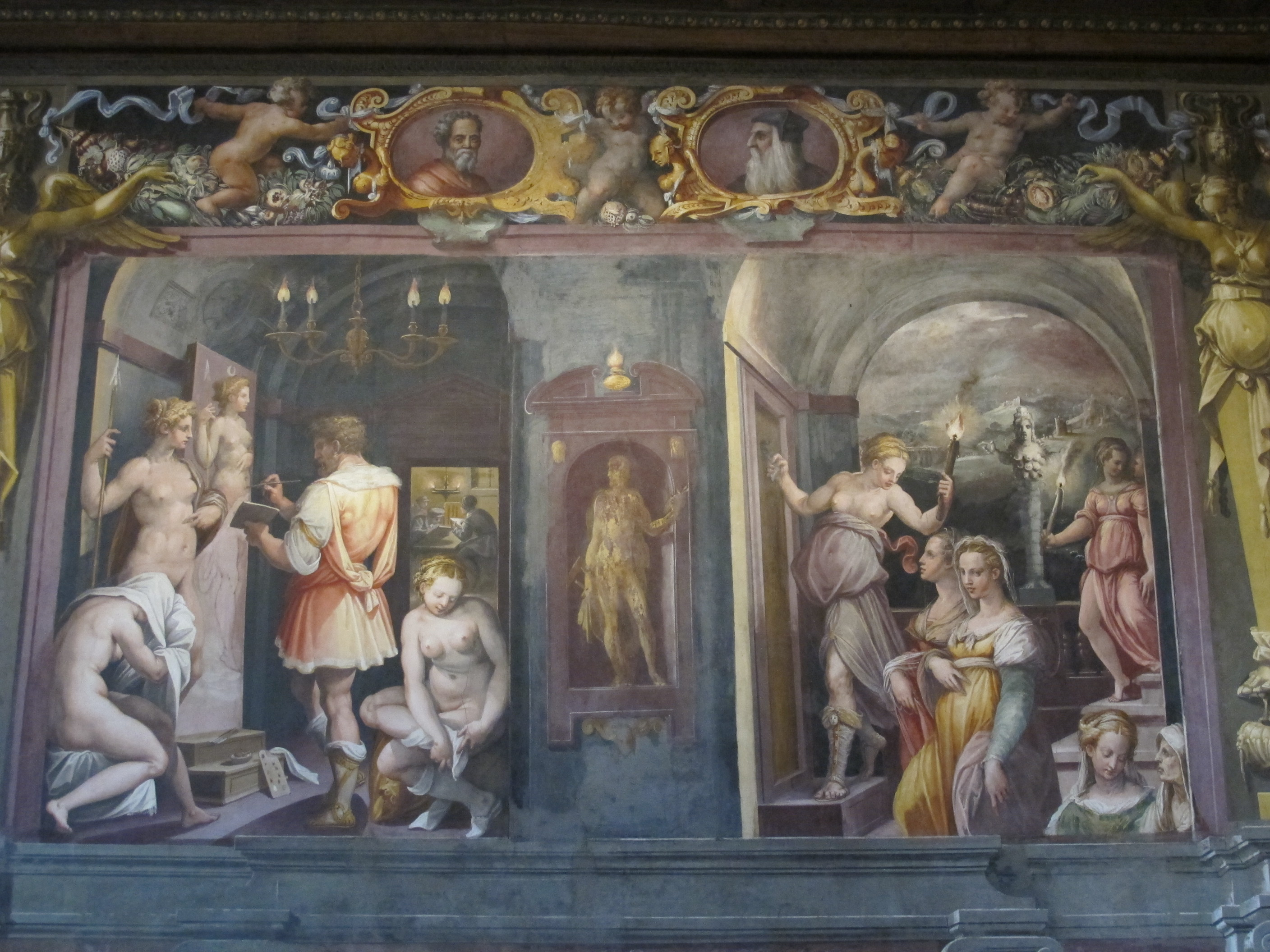
Life of Zeuxis

The building, dating back to around 1500 when palaces were erected or the pre-existing medieval terraced houses were redesigned in this area, is known to have been the Florentine residence of the painter Giorgio Vasari, rented to him by Duke Cosimo I de Medici, since 1557 after being requisitioned in 1548 from Niccolò Spinelli, owner of various buildings in the area (such as the Spinelli palace at no. 9 of the street). In 1561 the house was definitively donated to the artist as a sign of gratitude for his services. Similar to what was done in his residence at his hometown of Arezzo, the elderly artist and his collaborators, among them in particular Jacopo Zucchi, frescoed various rooms around 1572, of which the Sala Grande, on the main floor, is the only one that remains almost intact.

In 1677 the residence was visited by Francesco Cinelli who left an accurate description of both the frescoes and the other works of art preserved here at the time, including paintings and drawings by leading Renaissance artists Leonardo da Vinci, Ridolfo del Ghirlandaio, Fra Bartolomeo, Albrecht Dürer, Santi di Tito, Parmigianino and Paolo Veronese.

After Vasari's death, in 1574, the house passed to his heirs and with the disappearance of the last heir, in 1687, it was registered in the name of a congregation of lay people and purchased, at the end in the 19th century, by the Morrocchi family, which still owns it, although in 1910 Walther Limburger indicated it as inhabited by the Ghelardis, perhaps on a lease.

The palace appears in the list drawn up in 1901 by the General Directorate of Antiquities and Fine Arts, as a monumental building to be considered national artistic heritage, and has been subject to architectural constraint since 1933.

In 1942 the building underwent a restoration which involved the drafting of new plaster and the replacement of part of the stone on the facade. In 1995, an intervention was given to the elevations on the internal courtyard.

In more recent years, in a bad state of conservation, the Great Hall was restored thanks to the interest of the property, Umberto Baldini and the Horne Foundation (2009-2011) and the help of a loan from the Ente Cassa di Risparmio di Firenze. It has since 2011 been open to the public on reservation, through the ticket office of the nearby Museo Horne.

== Description ==
The façade still substantially maintains its 16th-century character, and is organized on three axes for five floors, the last one was the result of a 19-century expansion. The windows are lined up on the marcadavillale frames, all profiled by stone blocks arranged in a radial pattern which, well raised at the height of the noble floor (corresponding to the Great Hall), set back flush with the plaster on the upper floors, according to a custom of that time that occurs, for example, also in the adjacent Antinori Corsini Palace (at house number 6). Also worthy of note is the window for children, located below the central window on the first floor. "The sixteenth-century transformations, but essentially the changes made in the nineteenth century, only allow us to hypothesize about the structure of the house in the second half of the sixteenth century. The staircase with double straight ramp, the expansion of the access portal and the increase of one floor of the building on the street, an operation that further lengthened the façade after the 'redesign', almost certainly were carried out after the death of Vasari " (Marco Bini).

In the small internal courtyard which is accessed by a long entrance hall, two mighty pillars document the 14-century pre-existing structures. On the back wall there is a washed-out mural painting, with two allegorical figures next to a large, now worn coat of arms (which Walther Limburger interprets as referring to the Guidotti family), again attributable to the late 16th century.

== The Great Hall ==
The frescoes in the Great Hall enhance the theme of the arts and above all the primacy of painting. The decoration, created in collaboration with his workshop, enhances the figure of the artist, recalling some scenes of the great painters of antiquity, derived from Herodotus and Pliny the Elder, representing the allegories of the Arts and portraying, in the upper frieze, the most important painters included in the famous Lives. This decoration was probably designed by Vincenzo Borghini, a friend of the artist. On the east wall there is the pietra serena fireplace, with a painted bust by Vasari himself, among putti holding the system, curtains and urns, and on the right, the fresco of myth of the Origin of the Painting, in which a boy traces his shadow by drawing a silhouette on a wall. On this side there are also the allegories of Sculpture and Poetry .

The south wall shows the Stories of Apelles, the legendary Greek painter is behind one of his works to listen to the opinions of people, picking up a cobbler's suggestion to change the shape of the shoes; but when the cobbler, emboldened by having seen his advice followed, begins to criticize the anatomy of the legs, the painter chased him away, since for to criticize one must have knowledge of the subject dealt with. On this side there is also the door leading to the stairs, surmounted by the Medici and Christine of Lorraine coat of arms and the allegory of Music: this was frescoed only in the 19-century, when a door that was located in this place was closed.

The west side depicts the Story of Zeuxis of Syracuse, the legendary painter, who to portray the goddess Artemis in the most perfect way, decide to brought the most beautiful women in the city to his studio and, having them undressed, chose from each one only most beautiful detail, in search of the absolute ideal of beauty. In the background viewers can see the representation of a student workshop inspired by the everyday life of the time, while at the bottom right there are the heads of two women, probably Vasari's wife and mother. The allegories on this side represent Architecture and Painting.

The north side, also the last one, shows the window openings, complete with a buffered children's window, dating back to the owners who owned the house after the artist's death. Here begins the frieze of the thirteen portraits of the artists, inspired by the engravings that decorate the second edition of the Lives (1568), but here in color. For them, Vasari summarized his idea of art by choosing thirteen artists, esteemed by him either for their role as precursors, or for the highest level of their work, or because they were decisive in his training: thus appear, from left to right, Cimabue, Giotto and Masaccio, then Raphael (presented as Imago Christi), Michelangelo, Leonardo da Vinci and Andrea del Sarto; followed on the north side by Donatello and Brunelleschi, and on the west by Perin del Vaga, Giulio Romano, Rosso Fiorentino and Francesco Salviati.

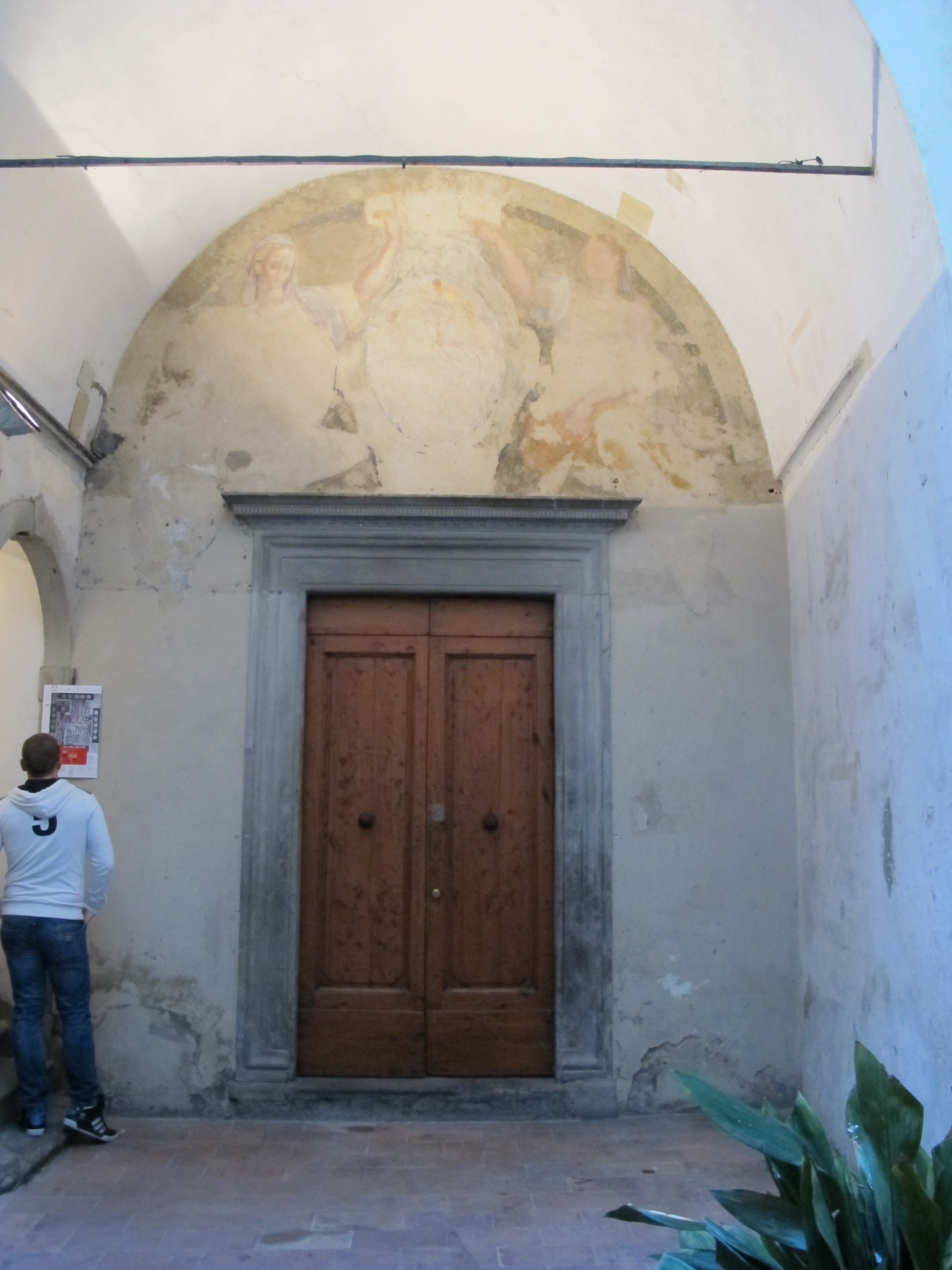
The courtyard

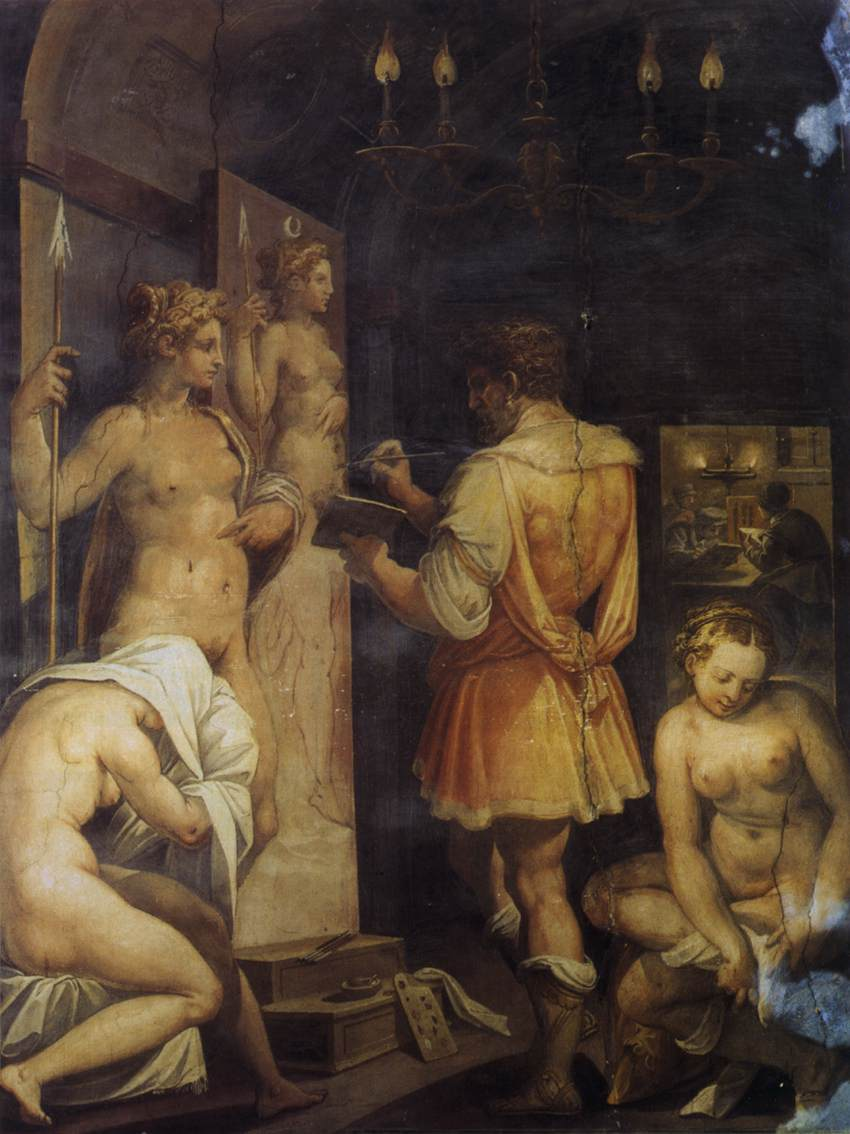
Vasari, Life of Zeuxis

== Bibliography ==
- (in German) Walther Limburger, Die Gebäude von Florenz: Architekten, Strassen und Plätze in alphabetischen Verzeichnissen, Lipsia, F.A. Brockhaus, 1910, n. 708;
- (in German) Walter Bombe, Giorgio Vasaris Häuser in Florenz und Arezzo und andere italienische Künstlerhäuser der Renaissance, in "Belvedere", 13, 1928, pp. 55–59;
- (in German) Matthias Winner, Die Quellen der Pictura-Allegorien in gemalten Bildergalerien des 17. Jahrhunderts zu Antwerper, Diss. Univ., Köln, 1957;
- (in French) Detlef Heikamp, A Florence, la maison de Vasari, in "L'Oeil", 1966, 137, pp. 2–9, 42;
- (in Italian) Mazzino Fossi, Documenti inediti vasariani, in "Antichità Viva", XIII, 1974, 3, pp. 63–66;
- (in Italian) Alessandro Cecchi, La casa del Vasari a Firenze and Marco Bini, Note al rilievo della casa fiorentina del Vasari, in Giorgio Vasari, exhibition catalogue (Arezzo, 26 September - 29 November 1981), Firenze, Edam, 1981, pp. 37–43 and 45–47;
- (in Italian) Alessandro Cecchi, Nuove ricerche sulla casa del Vasari a Firenze, in Giorgio Vasari tra decorazione ambientale e storiografia artistica, a cura di Gian Carlo Garfagnini, Firenze, Olschki, 1985, pp. 273–283;
- (in German) Albrecht Juerg, Die Häuser von Giorgio Vasari in Arezzo und Florenz, in Künstlerhäuser von der Renaissance bis zur Gegenwart, a cura di Eduard Hüttinger, Zürich, Waser, 1985, pp. 83–100;
- (in Italian) Alessandro Cecchi, Le case del Vasari ad Arezzo e Firenze, in Case di artisti in Toscana, a cura di Roberto Paolo Ciardi, Cinisello Balsamo, Pizzi, 1998, pp. 29–77;
- Michiaki Koshikawa, Apelles's Stories and the Paragone debate: a re-reading of the frescoes in the Casa Vasari in Florence, in "Artibus et Historiae", XXII, 2001, 43, pp. 17–28;
- Umberto Baldini, Pietro Alessandro Vigato, The Frescoes of Casa Vasari in Florence: an interdisciplinary approach to understanding, conserving, exploiting and promoting, Firenze, Polistampa, 2006;
- Liana De Girolami Cheney, The Homes of Giorgio Vasari, New York, Lang, 2006;
- (in Italian) Tiziana Landra, Il rebus di casa Vasari a Firenze: note a margine dell'Inventione per la decorazione del salotto, in Reverse engineering: un nuovo approccio allo studio dei grandi cicli rinascimentali, a cura di Èmilie Passignat e Antonio Pinelli, Roma, Carocci, 2007, pp. 139–144;
- (in Italian) Liana De Girolami Cheney, Le dimore di Giorgio Vasari, New York, Lang, 2011;
- (in Italian) Elisabetta Nardinocchi, Casa Vasari a Firenze. Specchio e sintesi dell'opera di un artista, in Ammannati e Vasari per la città dei Medici, a cura di Cristina Acidini e Giacomo Pirazzoli, Firenze, Polistampa, 2011, pp. 138–146;
- (in Italian) Elisabetta Nardinocchi, Casa Vasari. Giorgio Vasari, in Ammannati e Vasari per la città dei Medici, a cura di Cristina Acidini e Giacomo Pirazzoli, Firenze, Polistampa, 2011, pp. 223–224.
