= Lygisaurus novaeguineae =

Conservation status
- Least Concern (IUCN 3.1)

Scientific classification
- Kingdom: Animalia
- Phylum: Chordata
- Class: Reptilia
- Order: Squamata
- Suborder: Scinciformata
- Infraorder: Scincomorpha
- Family: Eugongylidae
- Genus: Lygisaurus
- Species: L. novaeguineae

Binomial name
- Lygisaurus novaeguineae (Meyer, 1874)

Species of lizard

Lygisaurus novaeguineae is a species of skink found in Queensland in Australia, Indonesia, and Papua New Guinea.
