= Parrhasius (painter) =

Late 5th/early 4th-century BC Greek painter

Parrhasius of Ephesus (Ancient Greek: Παρράσιος) was a famed painter of Ancient Greece who lived in the decades around 400 BC. Active during an era when other painters were starting to depict realistic scenes with shading, Parrhasius stood out by sticking to the older technique of line-drawing, and innovated new ways to portray volume using this method. He created new iconographies that future painters would reproduce for centuries.

== Life ==
Born to the painter Evenor, he settled in Athens. The period of his activity is fixed by the anecdote which Xenophon records of the conversation between him and Socrates on the subject of art; he was therefore distinguished as a painter before 399 BC. Seneca relates a tale that Parrhasius bought one of the Olynthians whom Philip sold into slavery, 346 BC, and tortured him in order to have a model for a picture of the bound Prometheus for the Parthenon in Athens; but the story, which is similar to one told of Michelangelo, is chronologically impossible.

== Contest with Zeuxis ==
Pliny the Elder tells a story of Parrhasius's contest with Zeuxis in his book Naturalis Historia. Zeuxis was perhaps the most prominent painter of this era, famous for his ability to depict scenes which appeared to be true to life using a new method called skiagraphia. Parrhasius, on the other hand, was the prime exponent of the older techniques of line-drawing, and highly respected for his compositions.

The challenge was to try painting the most realistic picture. Zeuxis painted some grapes so perfectly that a flock of birds flew down to eat them but, instead, only pecked at their picture. He then went to Parrhasius' studio to see the painting he had made, confident he had won. When Zeuxis came in, Parrhasius told Zeuxis to remove the curtain covering his painting. Zeuxis attempted to do so, and then discovered that the curtain was not a curtain, but a painting of a curtain. Zeuxis acknowledged himself to be surpassed, for while Zeuxis had deceived the birds, Parrhasius had deceived Zeuxis. This is one of the earliest examples of the idea of trompe-l'œil.

== Legacy ==
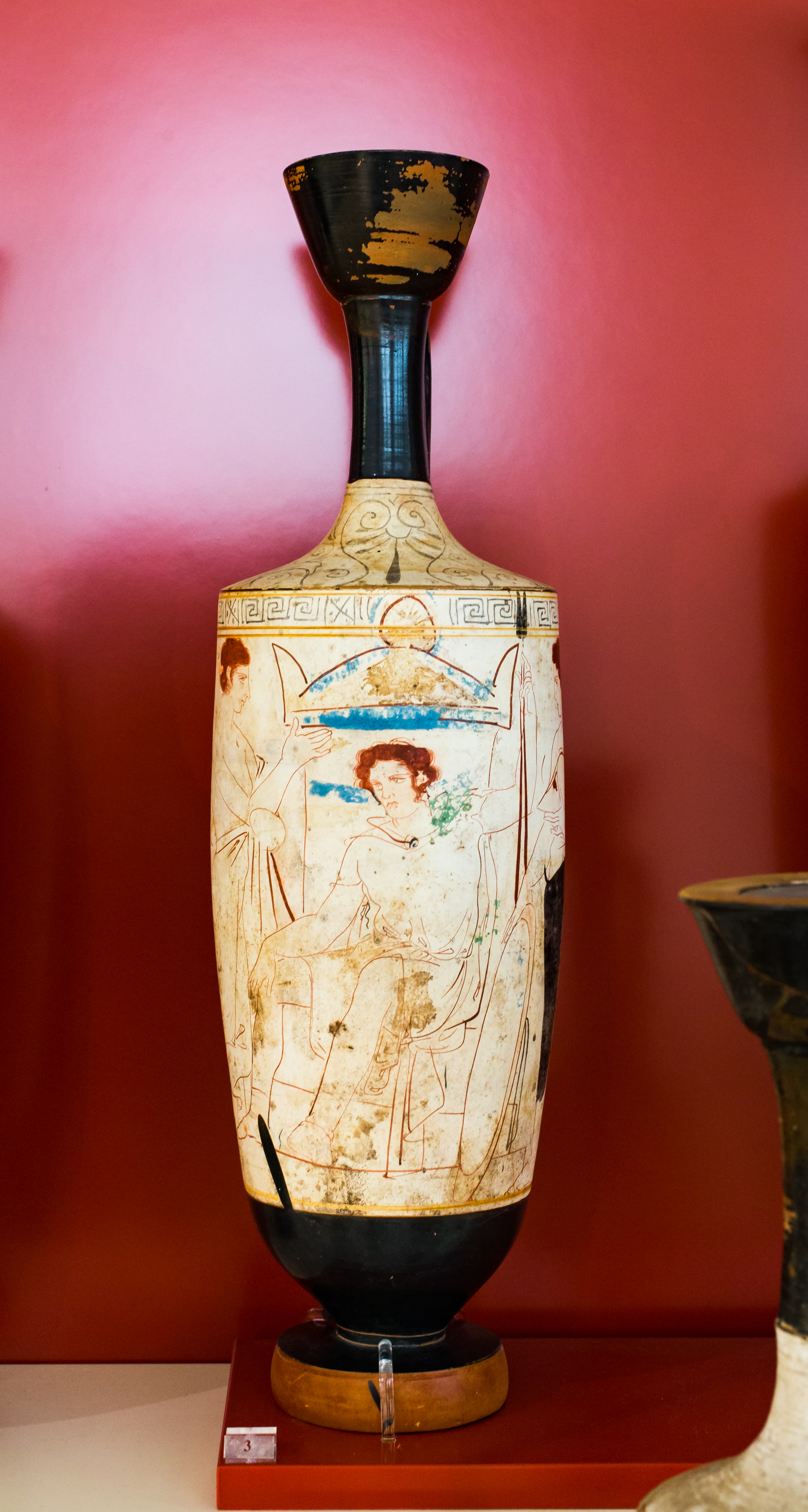
A Lekythos painted by an artist associated with Group R. Andreas Rumpf and Martin Robertson speculate that the depiction of the central figure, with his slanted head, morose expression, and seated pose, was influenced by Parrhasius.

Parrhasius was universally placed in the very first rank among painters by ancient art critics of later centuries. Quintilian called him the "law-giver" of painting, who created the definitive model of many gods and heroes for future painters. His skillful drawing of outlines is especially praised by ancient writers, and many of his drawings on wood and parchment were highly valued by later painters for purposes of study.

Parrhasius excelled at depicting volume, and some scholars have identified surviving artworks which may have made use of his techniques. Examples include White-Ground vase-paintings associated with the painters of "Group R," which were produced during the artist's era. A small group of paintings found on the marble bed from a Macedonian tomb in Potidaea, dating to the 4th Century BC, are also cited as exhibiting the Parrhasian style.

His picture of Theseus adorned the Capitol in Rome. His other works, besides the obscene subjects with which he is said to have amused his leisure, are chiefly mythological groups. A picture of the Demos, the personified People of Athens, is famous; according to the story, which is probably based upon epigrams, the twelve prominent characteristics of the people, though apparently quite inconsistent with each other, were distinctly expressed in this figure.

Parrhasius is commemorated in the scientific name of a species of Australian lizard, Lygisaurus parrhasius, the fire-tailed rainbow-skink.
