= Lygisaurus malleolus =

Conservation status
- Least Concern (IUCN 3.1)

Scientific classification
- Kingdom: Animalia
- Phylum: Chordata
- Class: Reptilia
- Order: Squamata
- Suborder: Scinciformata
- Infraorder: Scincomorpha
- Family: Eugongylidae
- Genus: Lygisaurus
- Species: L. malleolus

Binomial name
- Lygisaurus malleolus (Roberts in Couper et al., 2005)

Species of lizard

Lygisaurus malleolus, the red-tailed litter-skink, is a species of skink found in Queensland in Australia.
