= Lygisaurus macfarlani =

Conservation status
- Least Concern (IUCN 3.1)

Scientific classification
- Kingdom: Animalia
- Phylum: Chordata
- Class: Reptilia
- Order: Squamata
- Family: Scincidae
- Genus: Lygisaurus
- Species: L. macfarlani

Binomial name
- Lygisaurus macfarlani (Günther, 1877)

Synonyms
- Carlia macfarlani Günther, 1877

Species of lizard

Lygisaurus macfarlani, also known commonly as the translucent litter-skink, and MacFarlan's skink, is a species of lizard in the subfamily Eugongylinae of the family Scincidae. The species is native to northeastern Australia and Papua New Guinea.

== Etymology ==
The specific name, macfarlani, is in honor of English missionary Samuel Macfarlane (1837–1911).

== Description ==
Adults of Lygisaurus macfarlani have an average snout-to-vent length (SVL) of 3.7 cm (1.5 in). The lower eyelid has a small transparent disc. There are usually six upper labials.

== Geographic range ==
In Australia, Lygisaurus macfarlani is found in Northern Territory and Queensland. In Papua New Guinea, it is found in the Trans-Fly region and around Port Moresby.

== Habitat ==
Lygisaurus macfarlani occurs in a variety of natural habitats, including forest, savanna, shrubland, and grassland.

== Behavior ==
Lygisaurus macfarlani is terrestrial and diurnal.

== Diet ==
Lygisaurus macfarlani preys upon insects.
