= Lygisaurus tanneri =

Conservation status
- Least Concern (IUCN 3.1)

Scientific classification
- Kingdom: Animalia
- Phylum: Chordata
- Class: Reptilia
- Order: Squamata
- Family: Scincidae
- Genus: Lygisaurus
- Species: L. tanneri

Binomial name
- Lygisaurus tanneri Ingram & Covacevich, 1988

Synonyms
- Lygisaurus tanneri Ingram & Covacevich, 1988; Carlia tanneri — Stuart-Fox, Hugall & Moritz, 2002; Lygisaurus tanneri — Dolman & Hugall, 2008

Species of lizard

Lygisaurus tanneri, also known commonly as the Endeavour River litter-skink and Tanner's four-fingered skink, is a species of lizard in the family Scincidae. The species is endemic to Australia.

== Etymology ==
The specific name, tanneri, is in honor of Australian herpetologist Charles Tanner (1911–1996).

== Geographic range ==
L. tanneri is found in Queensland, Australia.

== Habitat ==
The preferred natural habitat of L. tanneri is forest.
