= Lygisaurus parrhasius =

Conservation status
- Least Concern (IUCN 3.1)

Scientific classification
- Kingdom: Animalia
- Phylum: Chordata
- Class: Reptilia
- Order: Squamata
- Family: Scincidae
- Genus: Lygisaurus
- Species: L. parrhasius

Binomial name
- Lygisaurus parrhasius (Couper, Covacevich & Lethbridge, 1994)

Synonyms
- Carlia parrhasius Couper, Covacevich & Lethbridge, 1994

Species of lizard

Lygisaurus parrhasius, also known commonly as the fire-tailed litter-skink and the fire-tailed rainbow-skink, is a species of lizard in the subfamily Eugongylinae of the family Scincidae. The species is native to northwestern Australia.

== Etymology ==
The specific name, parrhasius, commemorates ancient Greek artist Parrhasius.

== Description ==
The head of Lygisaurus parrhasius is coppery brown. The body is black with five white stripes, which are vertebral, dorsolateral, and midlateral. The tail is bright red. Adults usually have a snout-to-vent length (SVL) of about 3.3 cm (1.3 in).

== Geographic distribution ==
Lygisaurus parrhasius is found in Queensland, Australia.

== Habitat ==
The preferred natural habitat of Lygisaurus parrhasius is rocky areas.

== Reproduction ==
Lygisaurus parrhasius is oviparous.
