= Lygisaurus =

Scientific classification
- Kingdom: Animalia
- Phylum: Chordata
- Class: Reptilia
- Order: Squamata
- Family: Scincidae
- Subfamily: Eugongylinae
- Genus: Lygisaurus; De Vis, 1884

Genus of lizards

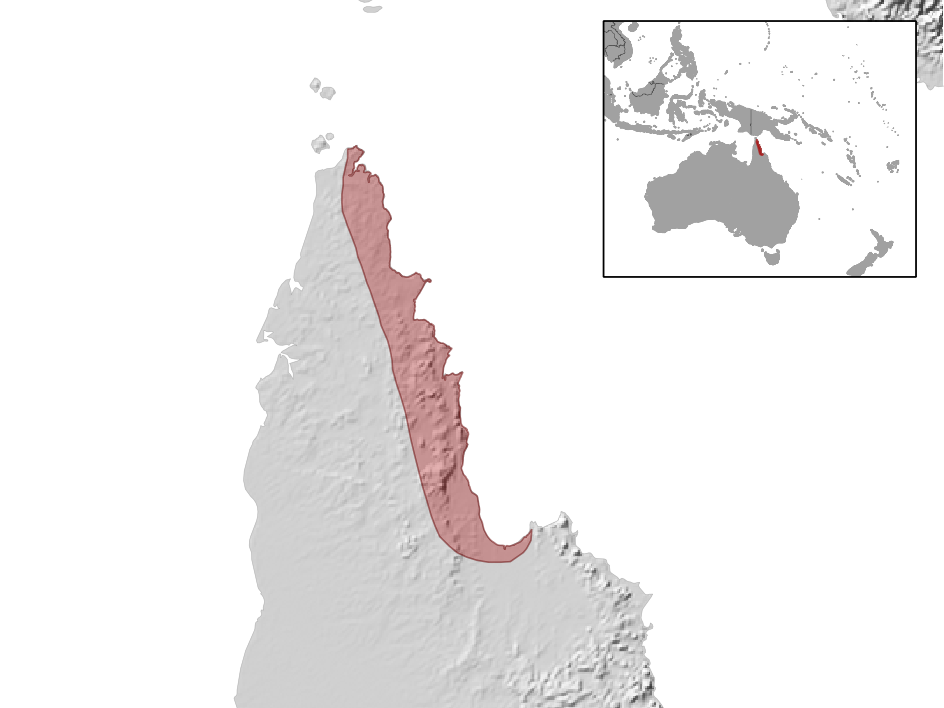
Geographic distribution of Lygisaurus sesbrauna

Lygisaurus is a genus of skinks, lizards in the family Scincidae.

== Geographic range ==
Species of Lygisaurus are found in Australia and New Guinea.

== Species ==
The following 14 species are recognized as being valid.

- Lygisaurus absconditus (Worthington Wilmer in Couper et al., 2005) – Mt. Surprise litter-skink
- Lygisaurus aeratus (Garman, 1901) – large-disced litter-skink
- Lygisaurus curtus (Boulenger, 1897)
- Lygisaurus foliorum De Vis, 1884 – tree-base litter-skink
- Lygisaurus laevis (Oudemans, 1894) – rainforest edge litter-skink
- Lygisaurus macfarlani (Günther, 1877) – translucent litter-skink
- Lygisaurus malleolus (Roberts in Couper et al., 2005) – red-tailed litter-skink
- Lygisaurus novaeguineae (Meyer, 1874)
- Lygisaurus parrhasius (Couper, Covacevich & Lethbridge, 1994) – fire-tailed litter-skink, fire-tailed rainbow-skink
- Lygisaurus rimula Ingram & Covacevich, 1980 – crevice rainbow-skink
- Lygisaurus rococo Ingram & Covacevich, 1988 – Chillagoe litter-skink
- Lygisaurus sesbrauna Ingram & Covacevich, 1988 – Eastern Cape litter-skink
- Lygisaurus tanneri Ingram & Covacevich, 1988 – Endeavour River litter-skink
- Lygisaurus zuma Couper, 1993 – sun-loving litter-skink

Nota bene: A binomial authority in parentheses indicates that the species was originally described in a genus other than Lygisaurus.
