= Lygisaurus absconditus =

Conservation status
- Data Deficient (IUCN 3.1)

Scientific classification
- Kingdom: Animalia
- Phylum: Chordata
- Class: Reptilia
- Order: Squamata
- Suborder: Scinciformata
- Infraorder: Scincomorpha
- Family: Eugongylidae
- Genus: Lygisaurus
- Species: L. absconditus

Binomial name
- Lygisaurus absconditus (Worthington Wilmer in Couper et al., 2005)

Species of lizard

Lygisaurus absconditus, the Mt. Surprise litter-skink, is a species of skink found in Queensland in Australia.
