= Lygisaurus curtus =

Conservation status
- Least Concern (IUCN 3.1)

Scientific classification
- Kingdom: Animalia
- Phylum: Chordata
- Class: Reptilia
- Order: Squamata
- Family: Scincidae
- Genus: Lygisaurus
- Species: L. curtus

Binomial name
- Lygisaurus curtus (Boulenger, 1897)

Species of lizard

Lygisaurus curtus is a species of skink found in Papua New Guinea.
