= Lygisaurus zuma =

Conservation status
- Least Concern (IUCN 3.1)

Scientific classification
- Kingdom: Animalia
- Phylum: Chordata
- Class: Reptilia
- Order: Squamata
- Family: Scincidae
- Genus: Lygisaurus
- Species: L. zuma

Binomial name
- Lygisaurus zuma Couper, 1993

Synonyms
- Carlia zuma (Couper, 1993)

Species of lizard

Lygisaurus zuma, also known commonly as the sun-loving litter-skink, is a species of lizard in the subfamily Eugongylinae of the family Scincidae (skinks). The species is endemic to the Australian state of Queensland.

== Etymology ==
The specific name, zuma, refers to Montezuma II, who was the last Aztec emperor and was also a sun worshipper.

== Description ==
Lygisaurus zuma has a large transparent disc in its moveable lower eyelid. The prominent ear-opening is round to almost horizontal, and edged with low flat lobules. There are seven upper labials. Adults have a snout-to-vent length (SVL) of about 3.4 cm (1.3 in).

== Geographic distribution ==
Lygisaurus zuma is found in northeastern Queensland, in the vicinity of Mackay and in the vicinity of Townsville.

== Habitat ==
The preferred natural habitat of Lygisaurus zuma is forest.

== Behavior ==
Lygisaurus zuma is terrestrial.

== Reproduction ==
Lygisaurus zuma is oviparous. During the breeding season, a sexually mature male will develop a red throat and a red tail.
