= Lygisaurus rococo =

Conservation status
- Least Concern (IUCN 3.1)

Scientific classification
- Kingdom: Animalia
- Phylum: Chordata
- Class: Reptilia
- Order: Squamata
- Suborder: Scinciformata
- Infraorder: Scincomorpha
- Family: Eugongylidae
- Genus: Lygisaurus
- Species: L. rococo

Binomial name
- Lygisaurus rococo Ingram & Covacevich, 1988

Species of lizard

Lygisaurus rococo, the Chillagoe litter-skink, is a species of skink found in Queensland in Australia.
