= Zeuxis (painter) =

5th-century BCE Greek painter

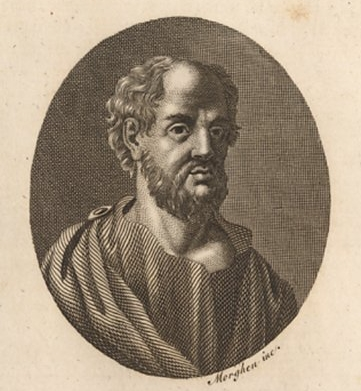
- Born: c. 464 BCE; Heraclea Lucania
- Died: c. 4th century BCE; Place of death unknown
- Cause of death: Death from laughter
- Occupation: Painter

Zeuxis (/ˈzjuːksɪs/; Ancient Greek: Ζεῦξις) (of Heraclea) was a late 5th-century- early 4th-century BCE Greek artist famed for his ability to create images that appeared highly realistic. None of his works survive, but anecdotes about Zeuxis's art and life have been referenced often in the history and literature of art and in art theory.

Much of the information about Zeuxis comes from Pliny the Elder's Natural History, but his work is also discussed by Xenophon and Aristotle. One of the most famous stories about Zeuxis centers on an artistic competition with the artist Parrhasius to prove which artist could create a greater illusion of nature. Zeuxis, Timanthes, and Parrhasius were painters of the Ionian School of painting. The Ionian School flourished during the 4th century BCE.

== Life and work ==
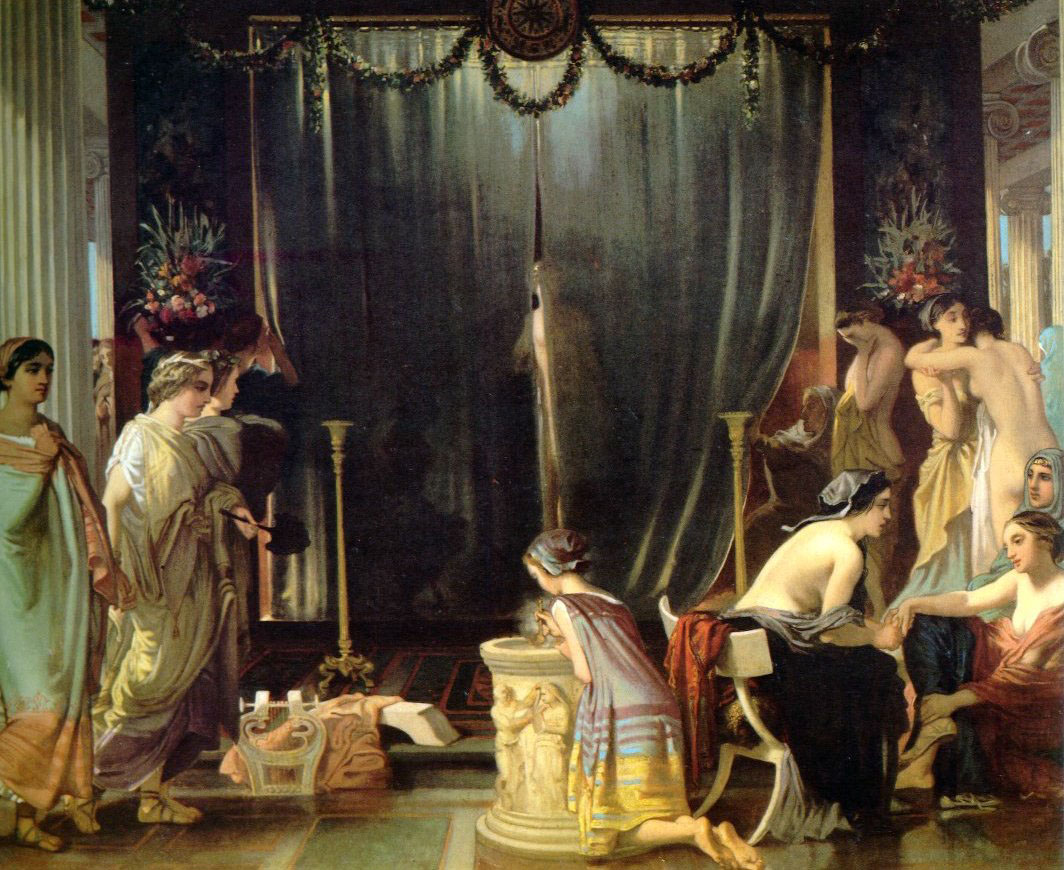
Victor Mottez, Zeuxis choosing his models (1858)

Zeuxis was born in Heraclea in 464 BCE, probably Heraclea Lucania, in the present-day region of Basilicata in the southeastern "boot" of Italy. He may have studied with Demophilus of Himera (Sicily), or with Neseus of Thasos (an island in the northern Aegean Sea), and/or with the Greek painter Appollodorus.

He was active across the ancient Greek world from Magna Graecia to Ephesus, to Macedonia, Samos and to Athens where his greatest number of works were made. The "Eros" of the temple of Aphrodite and the "Penelope" were some of his first works. Records cite his notable works as Helen, Zeus Enthroned, and The Infant Hercules Strangling the Serpents. He also painted an assembly of gods, Eros crowned with roses, Alcmene, Menelaus, an athlete, Pan, Marsyas chained, and an old woman. King Archelaus I of Macedon employed Zeuxis to decorate the palace of his new capital Pella with a picture of Pan. Most of his works went to Rome and Byzantium but disappeared during the time of Pausanias.

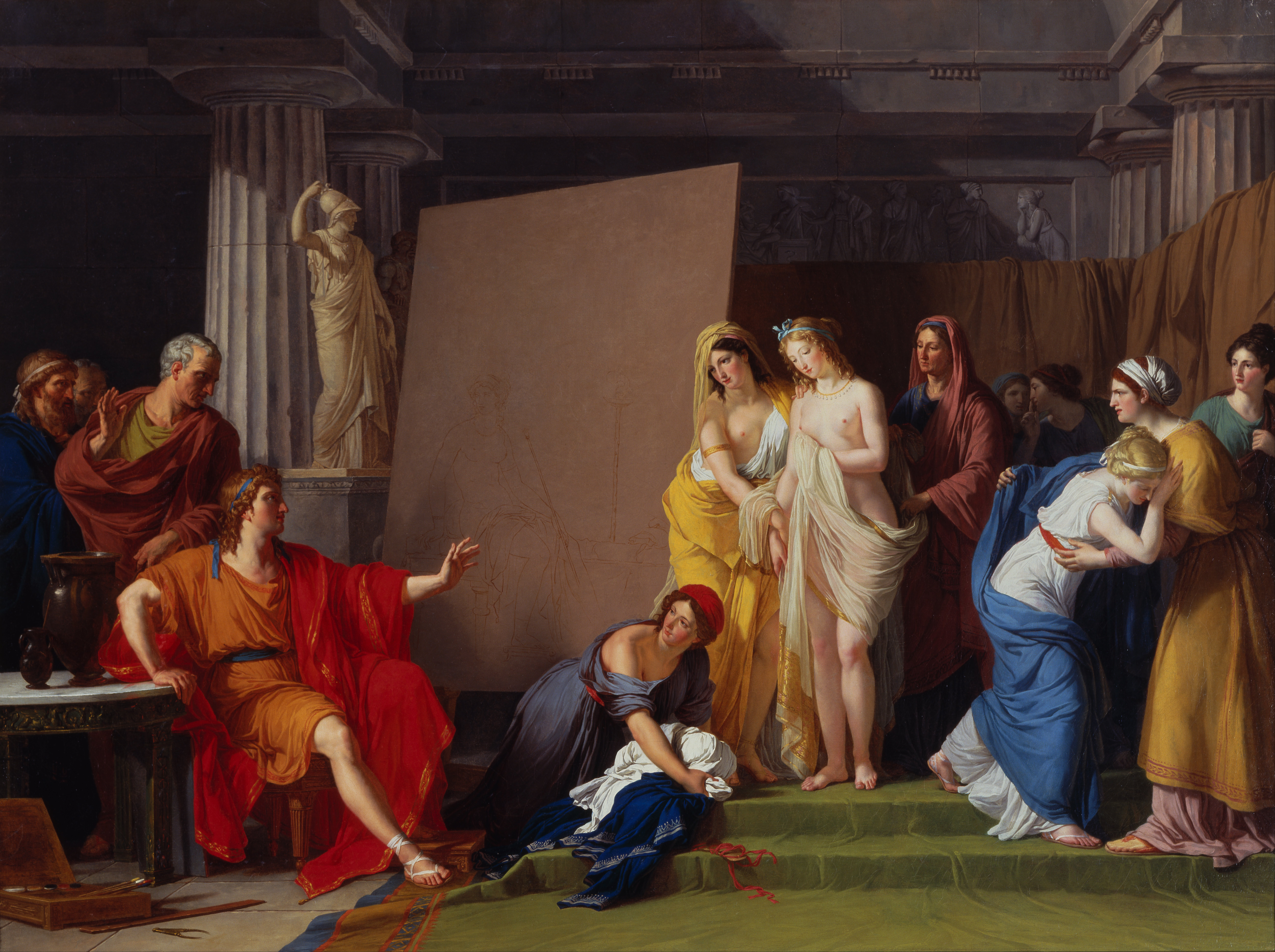
Zeuxis Choosing the Most Beautiful Women from Croton as His Models by François-André Vincent, 1789

Zeuxis was an innovative Greek painter. Although his paintings have not survived, historical records state they were known for their realism, small scale, novel subject matter, and independent format. His technique created volumetric illusion by manipulating light and shadow, a change from the usual method of filling in shapes with flat colors. Preferring small-scale panels to murals, Zeuxis also introduced genre subjects (such as still life) into painting. He contributed to the composite method of composition and may have originated an approach to, and thus influenced the concept of the ideal form of the nude, as described by art historian Kenneth Clark. As the story goes, according to Cicero, Zeuxis could not find a woman beautiful enough to pose as Helen of Troy, the most beautiful woman in the world, so he selected the finest features of five different models of the city of Croton to create a composite image of ideal beauty.

== Painting contest ==
According to the Naturalis Historia by Pliny the Elder, Zeuxis and his contemporary Parrhasius (of Ephesus and later Athens) staged a contest to determine the greater artist. When Zeuxis unveiled his painting of grapes, they appeared so real that birds flew down to peck at them. But when Parrhasius, whose painting was concealed behind a curtain, asked Zeuxis to pull aside that curtain, the curtain itself turned out to be a painted illusion. Parrhasius won, and Zeuxis said, "I have deceived the birds, but Parrhasius has deceived Zeuxis." This story was commonly referred to in 18th and 19th-century art theory to promote spatial illusion in painting. A similar anecdote says that Zeuxis once drew a boy holding grapes, and when birds, once again, tried to peck them, he was extremely displeased, stating that he must have painted the boy with less skill since the birds would have feared to approach otherwise.

== Death ==
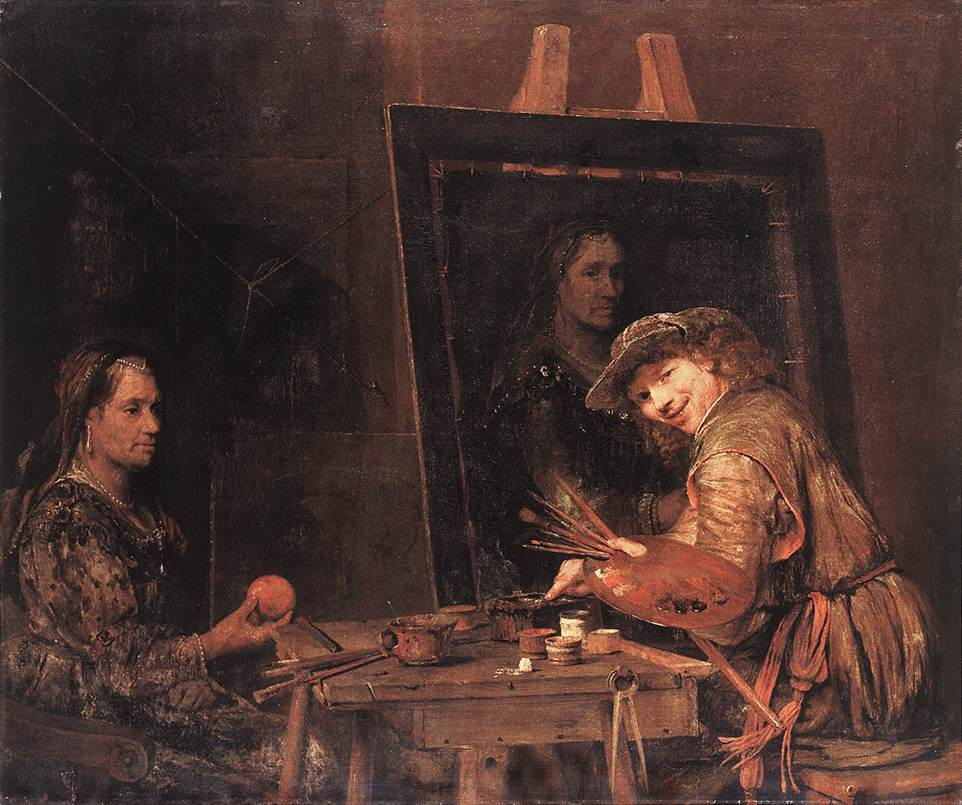
Arent de Gelder, Self-Portrait as Zeuxis Portraying an Ugly Old Woman (1685)

According to the Roman grammarian Festus, Zeuxis died laughing at a picture of an old woman he had just painted.

The legend is mentioned in Karel van Mander's Schilder-boeck (1604) and is known by later artists who alluded to the story in their self-portraits, such as Rembrandt's Self-Portrait as Zeuxis Laughing (c. 1662), Aert de Gelder's Self-Portrait as Zeuxis (1685), and possibly Jean-Étienne Liotard's Self-Portrait Laughing (c. 1770).

== See also ==
- Ancient Greek art
- Chiaroscuro
- Hierarchy of genres
- Trompe-l'œil
