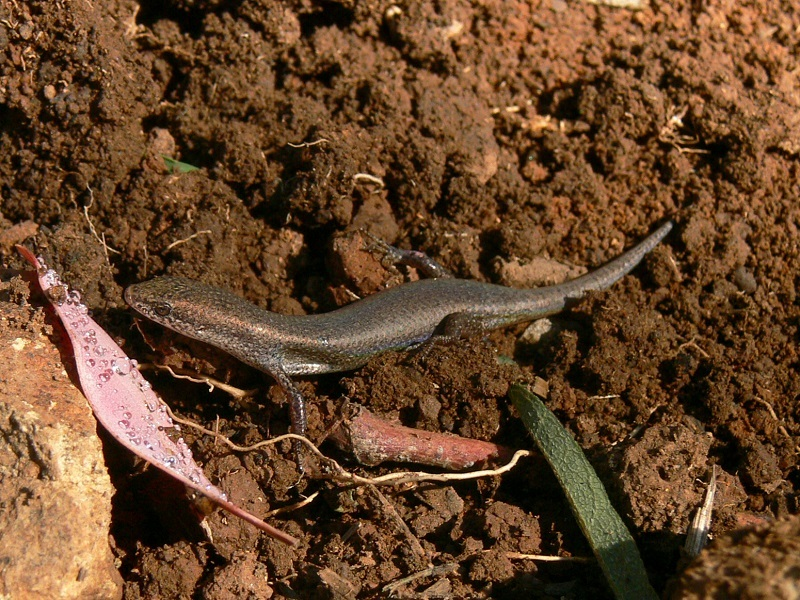

Conservation status
- Least Concern (IUCN 3.1)

Scientific classification
- Kingdom: Animalia
- Phylum: Chordata
- Class: Reptilia
- Order: Squamata
- Suborder: Scinciformata
- Infraorder: Scincomorpha
- Family: Eugongylidae
- Genus: Lygisaurus
- Species: L. foliorum

Binomial name
- Lygisaurus foliorum De Vis, 1884

= Lygisaurus foliorum =

Species of lizard

Lygisaurus foliorum, the tree-base litter-skink, is a species of skink found in New South Wales and Queensland in Australia.
