= Philagrafika =

Printmakers' collective in Philadelphia

Founded in 2000, Philagrafika is a regional consortium of individuals and organizations interested in understanding the impact of the printed image in contemporary art. In April 2006 its founding name was changed from the Philadelphia Print Collaborative to Philagrafika, but its mission to promote and sustain printmaking as a vital and valued art form by providing artistic, programmatic and administrative leadership for large-scale, cooperative initiatives with broad public exposure remains the same. Building upon the region's rich history and abundant artistic resources, Philagrafika not only encourages a critical dialogue, but it continues to provide benefits for the local arts community by enhancing the city's presence as an international center for printmaking. All of this is realized through international contemporary art festivals, an annual invitational portfolio, and various notable public projects. Philagrafika's programs have been designed to promote new curatorial and critical models for printmaking-disciplines in which the medium is (re)presented as an integral component of current artistic practices.

== Philagrafika 2010 ==
In 2010 Philagrafika produced the first international, multi-sited art exhibition and festival in Philadelphia that celebrated the printed image as a core strategy for artists today. Titled Philagrafika 2010, it debuted as one of the largest art events in the United States and the world's most important print-related exposition. Philagrafika artistic director, Jose Roca, led a team of curators from Philadelphia museums and galleries who developed a set of curated exhibitions that premiered in January 2010 and ran through April 2010 Philadelphia, Pennsylvania, United States. This region wide event joined prominent museums, cultural institutions, over 1000 artists, and a curatorial team to collaboratively forge the way for what will become a recurring event in Philadelphia.

Philagrafika 2010 was divided into three components. Housed in five local museums/galleries, The Graphic Unconscious was the core exhibition, with over 35 artists from 18 countries. Out of Print, the second component matched five artists with five historic institutions in Philadelphia where they created new works inspired by that institutions unique collection. Seventy-five additional cultural institutions within Philadelphia organized the final component, Independent Projects . This component included an array of monographic, group, and thematic exhibitions that emphasized the printed image as its main tenet.

== Contributing artists ==
The Graphic Unconscious

- Eric Avery
- Christiane Baumgartner
- Erick Beltrán
- Bitterkimix
- Mark Bradford
- Eloísa Cartonera
- Sue Coe
- Julius Deutschbauer
- Dexter Sinister
- Dispatch
- Drive By Press
- Art Hazelwood
- Orit Hofshi
- Thomas Kilpper
- Gunilla Klingberg
- Virgil Marti
- Paul Morrison
- Óscar Muñoz
- Pepón Osorio
- Carl Pope
- Betsabeé Romero
- Francesc Ruiz
- Jenny Schmid
- Self-Help Graphics & Art
- Regina Silveira
- Kiki Smith
- Space 1026
- Superflex
- Swoon
- Tabaimo
- Temporary Services
- Tromarama
- Barthélémy Toguo
- Young-Hae Chang Heavy Industries
- Qiu Zhijie

Out of Print

- Lisa Anne Auerbach
- Cannonball Press
- Enrique Chagoya
- Pablo Helguera
- Duke Riley
