= Skiagraphia =

Skiagraphia is a painting technique developed by Ancient Greek painter Apollodorus, used to create shadows in an image.

Skiagraphia is often described as a hatching technique used to create the illusion of forms through shading. The shading is created by the use of curved lines, either by the use of hatching or cross-hatching. Within this same approach, painters can use different colors to add shade to an area.

Archaeologist Eva Keuls, using passages from Aristotle, suggested that "skiagraphia" was a technique that utilized patches of color that blend from afar, similar to the neo-impressionist paintings of Georges Seurat, but this is disputed by Elizabeth G. Pemberton, who instead suggests that the passages from Aristotle are only in relation to shade and not color.

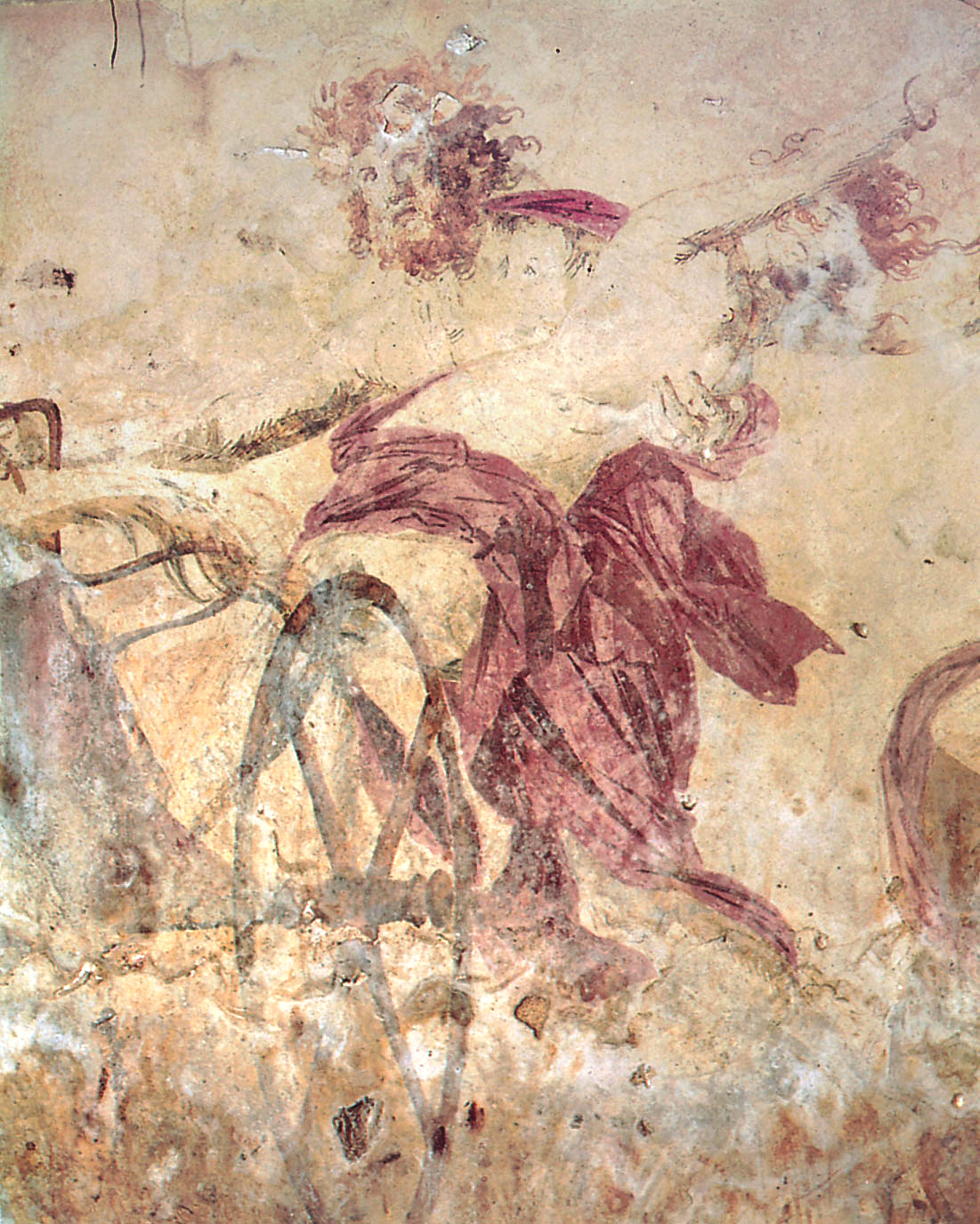
Detail from the vergina tomb, given as an example of skiagraphia by Britannica. The original article points to the hatched, colored lines of the drapery to create shade.
