= Saladi Beach =

Saladi Beach Σαλάντι ή Σαλάντιον Salanti
- Settlement & Beach
- Location in Greece
- Coordinates: 37.4490°N 23.1278°E
- Country: Greece
- Time zone: UTC+2 (EET)
  - Summer (DST): UTC+3 (EEST)
- Postal code: 21300

Saladi Beach Naturist Hotel

General information
- Status: closed
- Location: Saladi Beach, Greece
- Opening: 1974
- Closed: 1980

Technical details
- Floor count: 10
- Floor area: 1,800 sq.m.

Saladi or Salanti (Greek: Σαλάντι, Σαλάντιον) is a seaside prehistoric settlement located in the Argolic Gulf of Greece. Situated in the middle of Didymos Bay on the eastern coastline of Argolis, it lies north of the Franchthi Cave.

The beach facing east spans 750 meters, while the northern part comprises smaller beaches interspersed with rocks that extend into the sea. To the south, the beach ends at a peninsula that juts out perpendicularly, measuring 600 meters in length. At the edge of this peninsula stands the small church of Agios Nikolaos. A limestone hill rises above the peninsula, and at the point where the beach ends, a small seasonal wetland has formed, attracting various species of birds.

== Tourism Development and Decline ==
=== Rise ===
During the Greek junta period (1967-1974), a Greek businessman built a large hotel complex on Salanti Beach. A few years later, in 1980, he converted it into a hotel exclusively for nudists, achieving notable success. Thus, in the 1980s, the beach, which had been almost unknown until then, became one of the most famous in Europe for a specific audience. The operation of the first nudist hotel in Greece caused a series of disturbances both locally and more broadly.

The hotel, with a total capacity of 924 beds, was built on a plot of 114.5 acres, very close to the beach, and was developed across 10 levels. The complex included a main building with a basement housing auxiliary space, such as laundries, ground floor with a reception area, living room, bar, and three restaurants with a combined capacity of 900 people. It also featured an entertainment area, kitchen, and bathrooms. The mezzanine housed staff dormitories, and the eight floors occupied a total area of 15,960 sq.m.

Saladi Beach had central air conditioning, five elevators, and large terraces with a total area of 1,800 sq.m. offering sea views. Additionally, there was an external complex with 76 bungalows covering a total area of 2,200 sq.m. Support and service buildings for the bungalows included a fully equipped tavern of 150 sq.m. with a capacity for 300 people, two nightclubs, a mini-golf area, tennis and volleyball courts, children's playground, adult pool, and children's pool. The facility also featured a biological purification system for 2,000 people and water tanks. The surrounding area was wooded, with 1,000 olive trees and 500 lemon trees.

=== Fall ===
Although the hotel provided 160 jobs to residents of the neighboring small village of Didyma, its operation caused reactions and tensions, both from locals and the Priesthood, led by Metropolitan Ierotheos of Hydra and Spetses Islands.

The main reason for the disagreements and reactions was the conservatism that still prevailed in the Greek provinces in the 1980s. While the country seemed to be seeking modernization and change after the years of the dictatorship, a large part of it remained attached to traditional values and ideas. As a result, the new venture in Saladi Beach was met with mistrust and hostility.

Residents and the church united in opposition to the operation of the hotel, arguing that indecent and inappropriate acts were taking place there. Although the hotel grounds were fenced off to prevent nudists from meeting locals, the church and residents claimed that busloads of voyeurs came from all over the country and that the overall presence of visitors and intruders disrupted the moral balance of the community.

Under the guidance of the church and some Greek politicians, locals soon demanded the removal of the nudists and accused the hotelier of using violence against them. The issue quickly gained attention, with the media sending reporters and photographers to document the events. Ultimately, the villagers, led by the church, rebelled and arrived in boats at the Salanti beach, where they chased away the nudists. The tourists left, and the hotel closed that same summer.

== Effects ==
The incident precipitated a sharp downturn in tourism within the area, impacting on the operations of three other hotels in the broader region, all of which subsequently closed.

In the ensuing years, the hotel was acquired by a new owner and operated as a "regular" hotel. However, it failed to shake off its tarnished reputation. Today, the Salanti hotel stands abandoned and derelict, its interior serving as a makeshift dumpsite.

By 1981, a year following the closure of the nudist hotel, many residents of Didyma village, particularly those who had been staunch opponents, expressed regret over the repercussions of their actions, including the loss of 160 jobs.
