= Adamantios Sampson =

Greek archaeologist

Adamantios Sampson (Greek: Αδαμάντιος Σάμψων) is a Greek archaeologist who served as an Inspector of Antiquities for the Greek Administration of Antiquity. Since 1999, he has been a professor in the University of the Aegean, Department of Mediterranean Studies, Rhodes

Sampson specialised in research on prehistoric Neolithic and Mesolithic sites in Southern Greece. Among the sites he has studied are the so-called Cave of the Cyclops on the islet of Youra near Alonissos; the islet of Υali near Nisyros; the Maroulas site on Kythnos; the Kerame site on Ikaria; Sarakenos Cave on Boeotia; the "Skoteini cave" in Euboea and the "Cave of the Lakes" near Kalavryta.

== Field experience ==
From 1973 to 1981, Sampson was the director of archaeological surveys and excavations of both prehistoric and historic periods in open air sites and caves in Euboea (Chalkis, Eretria, Kyme, Aliveri, Kerinthos,), Thebes, Dodecanese (Rhodes, Telos, Alimnia, Leros, Yali, Karpathos), Peloponnese (Cave of Nestor, Kastria).

From 1982 to 1990, Sampson was director of the Manika project. It involved systematic surveys and excavations in caves and neolithic open air sites in Rhodes and the surrounding islands. In 1986, using a grant from the National Geographic Society, Sampson excavated an Early Bronze Age town and cemetery near Chalkis. Also in 1986, he excavated a Neolithic settlement and cemetery on Yali, near Nissiros.

From 1986 to 1991, Sampson was the Director of the Skoteini Cave project, surveying and excavating a Neolithic settlement and cemetery. He was the director of the Cave of Lakes project, at Kastria, from 1992 to 1994, looking for Neolithic and Bronze Age deposits. Sampson also directed the Cave of Cyclope Project until 1996. This was surveying and excavating Neolithic, Mesolithic and Upper Palaeolithic finds

In 1994, Sampson started directing the Cave of Sarakenos Project, excavating Middle Palaeolithic to MBA. Systematic surveys in the caves at the edge of the former lake Kopais. From 1995 to 2003, he directed the Mykonos Project, excavating at Ftelia, a Late Neolithic settlement on the island. Director of the Maroulas Kythnos Project Systematic excavation of the Mesolithic settlement and surface survey of the island (1996–2005) Director of Ikaria Project 2004 ongoing Surveys and excavations in Mesolithic and Neolithic sites, ongoing Director of the Wadi Hamarash, Jordan Project 2006 ongoing Surface surveys and excavation in a PPNB settlement (8th mill. BC) and in a PPNA site (10th mill. BC)

== Published works ==
- 1981 - Eυβοϊκή Κύμη Ι (Εuboean Kyme I), Archive of Euboean Studies, Athens.
- 1981 - H Nεολιθική και η Πρωτοελλαδική Ι στην Εύβοια (The Neolithic and Early Bronze Age I in Euboea), PhD, Archive of Euboean Studies, Athens.
- 1985 - Mάνικα Ι. Μία Πρωτοελλαδική πόλη κοντά στη Χαλκίδα (Manika I. An Early Bronze Age settlement near Chalkis), Arch. of Euboean Studies, Athens.
- 1987 - Η Νεολιθική περίοδος στα Δωδεκάνησα (The Neolithic period in the Dodecanese),ΤAP Ministry of Culture, Athens.
- 1988 - Mάνικα ΙΙ. Ο ΠΕ οικισμός και το νεκροταφείο (Manika II. The Early Bronze Age settlement and cemetery), Municipality of Chalkis.
- 1993 - To σπήλαιο Σκοτεινή στα Θαρρούνια της Εύβοιας (Skoteini at Tharrounia. The cave, the settlement and the cemetery), Eph. of Spelaeology, Ministry of Culture, Athens.
- 1993 - Καλογερόβρυση. Ένας οικισμός της Πρώιμης Εποχής του Χαλκού στα Φύλλα της Εύβοιας (Κaloyerovrysi. A settlement of the Early Bronze Age at Phylla, Euboea), Eph. of Spelaeology, Ministry of Culture, Athens
- 1993 - Late Neolithic remains at Tharrounia, Euboea. A model for the seasonal use of settlements and caves, BSA 87, 61..
- 1995 - Σκοπέλου Λαϊκός Πολιτισμός (The Folk Culture of Skopelos), Folk Museum of Skopelos.
- 1996 - Excavation at the Cave of Cyclope, Youra. In E. Alram-Stern, ed., Die Agaische Frühzeit (2. serie). Forschungsbericht 1975–1993. Wien. pp. 507–520.
- 1997 - Η εθνοαρχαιολογία του Γυαλιού της Νισύρου: Εποχικές μετακινήσεις στα νησιά του ΝΑ Αιγαίου (The Ethnoarchaeology of Υali, Nisyros: Periodic Migrations in the islands of the Southeast Aegean), Athens: Dodecanesian Society for Literature and Arts.
- 1997 - Το σπήλαιο των Λιμνών στα Καστριά Καλαβρύτων: Μια προϊστορική θέση στην ορεινή Πελοπόννησο (The Cave of the Lakes at Kastria Kalavryta: A Prehistoric Site in the Ηighlands of the Peloponnese), Athens, Monograph in Society of Peloponnesian Studies.
- 1998 - The Neolithic and Mesolithic occupation of the Cave of Cyclope, Youra, Alonnessos, Greece. BSA 93, 1-21
- 1998 - Sampson A., J. Kozlowski 1998, Εntre l' Anatolie et les Balkans: une sequence mésolithique-néolithique de l' ile de Youra (Sporades du Nord), in M. Otte (ed.), Prehistoire de l' Anatolie, Genése de deux mondes, ERAUL 1998, 125-141.
- 1998 - Sampson A., Y. Facorellis, Y. Maniatis 1998, New evidence for the cave occupation during the late Neolithic period in Greece, Proceedings of C14 Conference Lyon, 279.
- 1999 - Sampson A. & Ι. Liritzis 1999, Archaeological and archaeometrical research at Yali, Dodecanese, ΤUΒΑ-AR 2, 101-115
- 1999 - Αulis mycenienne et la route maritime de l' Egee du Nord, volume in honour of Μ. Wiener, in R. Laffineur (ed.), Meletemata. Studies in Aegean Archaeology, III, 741-746.
- 1999 - Sampson A., J. Kozlowski 1999, The cave of Cyclope in the Northern Aegean. A specialized fishing shelter of the Mesolithic and the Neolithic period, Neo-lithics 3, Berlin.
- 2000 - Nήσος Σκόπελος. Μια ιστορική και αρχαιολογική αφήγηση (Skopelos. An historical and archaeological narration), Folk Museum of Skopelos.
- 2001 - Η αρχαιολογική έρευνα στις Βόρειες Σποράδες (The Archaeology of Northern Sporades), Municipality of Alonnessos.
- 2001 - Liritzis I. & A. Sampson 2001 (eds), The Aegean Basin between the Balkans, Anatolia and Near East. Local experimentation and outward interactions in an island society, Proceedings of symposium, Rhodes.
- 2002 - The Neolithic settlement at Ftelia, Mykonos, Univ. of the Aegean.
- 2002 - Sampson A., J. Kozlowski, M Kaczanowska, V. Giannouli 2002, The Mesolithic settlement at Maroulas, Kythnos, Mediterranean Archaeology and Archaeometry 2, 45.
- 2002 - Katsarou S., A. Sampson, E. Dimou 2002, Obsidian as temper in the Neolithic pottery from Yali, Greece, Neolithic pottery, in V. Kilikoglou, A. Hein and Y. Maniatis (eds), Modern trends in scientific studies on Ancient Ceramics, ΒAR Inter. Series 1011, 111-120.
- 2003 - Sampson A., J. Kozlowski, M. Kaczanowska 2003, The Μesolithic chipped stone industries from the Cyclops Cave, in C. Perlès and N. Galanidou (eds), The Greek Mesolithic: problems and perspectives, BSA, London.
- 2005 - Early productive stages in the Aegean Basin from 9th to 7th mill BC, in C. Lichter (ed.), Anatolian-European relations from the second half of the 7th through the first half of the 6th mill BC, Istanbul, 131-142.
- 2005 - Sampson Α., J. K. Kozłowski, M. Kaczanowska 2005 - Prehistoric excavations in the Aegean, New Contributions to the Early Settlement of the Aegean Islands, Proceedings of Polish Academy.
- 2006 - Η προϊστορία του Αιγαίου, Παλαιολιθική, Μεσολιθική, Νεολιθική, (The prehistory of the Aegean Basin), ed. Atrapos, Athens.
- 2006 - Πολιτισμοί του Κόσμου. Σχεδίασμα Ιστορίας και Αρχαιολογίας (Civilizations of the World) ed. Iolkos, Athens.
- 2006 - The Sarakenos Cave and the palaeoenvironment in the Copais Basin, Boeotia, Central Greece, in P. J. Smith (ed.), Cults, coins, history and inscriptions VII: Studies in honor of John M. Fossey III, 61-75.
- 2006 - Kaczanowska M., Kozlowski J. K., Sampson A. 2006, Neolithic Chipped Stone Industries from the Island of Rhodes : A Case Study of the Ayios Georgios Cave near Kalythies. In A. Erkanal-Öktü et al. (eds), Studies in Honor of Hayat Erkanal Cultural Reflections, İstanbul: Homer Kitabevi.
- 2007 - Προϊστορική Αρχαιολογία της Μεσογείου (The prehistory of the Mediterranean Basin), ed. Kardamitsa, Athens.
- 2008 - The Cyclops Cave on the island of Youra, Greece. Mesolithic and Neolithic networks in the Northern Aegean Basin, vol 1, INSTAP Monograph Series, Philadelphia.
- 2008 - The Neolithic and Bronze Age Occupation of the Sarakenos Cave in Boeotia. Cave Settlement Patterns and Population Movements in Central and Southern Greece, University of the Aegean and Polish Academy, Athens.
- 2008 - Sampson A., M. Kaczanowska, J. K. Kozlowski, The first Mesolithic site in the eastern part of the Aegean Basin: excavations into the site Kerame I on the island of Ikaria 2008, in Annual of the Polish Academy of Arts and Sciences, 321-329.
- 2008 - Poulianos N. & A. Sampson 2008, Mesolithic human remains from Kythnos island, Greece, Human Evolution, 23, 187-203.
- 2008 - Sampson A. 2008, The architecture in the Neolithic settlement of Ftelia on Mykonos, in N. Brodie, J. Doole, G. Gavalas and C. Renfrew (eds), Horizon. A colloquium on the prehistory of the Cyclades, 29-38, Cambridge.
- 2008 - From the Mesolithic to the Neolithic: New data on Aegean Prehistory, in H. Erkanal, H. Hauptmann, V. Sahoglu and R. Tuncel (eds), The Aegean in the Neolithic and the Early Bronze Age, Ankara, 503-516.
- 2008 - Sampson A. & P. Fotiadi 2008, EC II-III finds from Rivari, Melos, in N. Brodie, J. Doole, G. Gavalas and C. Renfrew (eds), Horizon. A colloquium on the prehistory of the Cyclades, 217-224, Cambridge.
- 2009 - Sampson A., M. Kaczanowska, J. Kozlowski 2009, Sarakenos Cave in Boeotia from Palaeolithic to the Early Bronze Age, in Eurasian Prehistory 6 (1), 1-33.
- 2010 - Sampson A., M. Kaczanowska, J. Kozlowski, The prehistory of the island of Kythnos and the Mesolithic settlement of Maroulas, Polish Academy and University of the Aegean, Kraków.
- 2010 - Μεσολιθική Ελλάδα. Παλαιοπεριβάλλον, Οικονομία, Τεχνολογία, (Μesolithic Greece). Palaeoenvironment, Palaeoeconomy and Technology, ed. Ion, Athens.
- 2011 - Wadi Hamarash. A new MPPNB site in Jordan, Annual of the Department of Antiquities of Jordan 54, 73-84.
- 2011 - The excavation of 2010 at the Wadi Hamarash-Suweif (Ghawr as-Safi), Annual of the Department of Antiquities of Jordan 54, 85-94.
- 2011 - The Cave of the Cyclops, vol. II. INSTAP Monograph Series, Philadelphia.
- 2011 - Drivaliari A., I. Liritzis, A. Sampson 2011, Stable Isotopic analysis of the mollusk shells, in A. Sampson (ed.), The Cyclops Cave on the island of Youra, Greece. Mesolithic and Neolithic networks in the Northern Aegean Basin. Bone tool industries, Dietary resources and archaeometric studies, Vol. II, INSTAP Academic Press, Philadelphia, 385-390.
- 2011 - Laskaris A., Sampson A., F. Mavridis & I. Liritzis 2011, Late Pleistocene/Early Holocene seafaring in the Aegean: New obsidian hydration dates employing the novel SIMS-SS method, Journal of Archaeological Science, 38, 2475-2479.
- 2012 - The 2011 excavations at Wadi Hamarash 1 and Wadi Sharara, as-Safi, Jordan, ADAJ 55, 73-83.
- 2012 - Excavations at Wadi Hamarash 1 Sharara, in D.R. Keller, B. A. Porter, C. A. Turtle (eds), Archaeology in Jordan 2010 and 2011 seasons, American Journal of Archaeology, vol 116,723-725.
- 2012 - A. Sampson, J. Kozlowski, M. Kaczanowska, Mesolithic occupations and environments on the island of Ikaria, Aegean, Greece, monograph 80, Folia Quaternaria, Kraków.
- 2013 - Wadi Hamarash 1. An early PPNB settlement at Wasi al-Hasa, Jordan, University of the Aegean, Lab. of Environmental Archaeology Monographs, Rhodes.
- 2014 - To σπήλαιο Σαρακηνού στο Ακραίφνιο Βοιωτίας (The Sarakenos Cave at Akraiphnion, Boeotia), Univ. of the Aegean, Munic. of Orchomenos.
- 2014 - The Mesolithic of the Aegean Basin, in Manen C., Perrin T. & Guillaine J.(eds), The Neolithic transition in the Mediterranean, Errance, 193-212.
- 2014 -Ikaria. Prehistory and Ethnoarchaeology, Society for Ikarian Studies, Athens.
- 2015 -Kontopoulos I. & A. Sampson 2015, Prehistoric diet on the island of Euboea, Greece: an isotopic investigation, Mediterranean Archaeology and Archaeometry, Vol. 15, 97-111.
- 2015 -Orphanidis L. and A. Sampson 2015, The Sarakenos Cave at Akraiphion, Boeotia, Greece. Vol. III. The figurines of the Neolithic period, Athens.
- 2015 -The Aegean Mesolithic. Environment, Economy and seafaring, in A. J. Ammerman & T. Davis (eds), Island Archaeology and the Origins of Seafaring in the Eastern Mediterranean, Proceedings of the Wenner Gren Workshop held at Reggio Calabria, 2012 Eurasian Prehistory, 11 (1–2): 63–74.
- 2016 - Sampson A., J. Kozlowski, M. Kaczanowska 2016, Lithic industries of the Aegean Upper Mesolithic, Mediterranean Archaeology and Archaeometry, Vol. 16 No 3 (2016), pp. 229–243.
- 2016 - Kaczanowska M., J. Kozlowski, A. Sampson 2016, The Sarakenos Cave at Akraiphion, Boeotia, Greece. Vol. II. The Early Neolithic, the Mesolithic and the Upper Palaeolithic. The Polish Academy of Arts and Sciences, Kraków.
- 2016 - Manika. An Early Helladic settlement and cemetery, vol. II, 2nd ed. Athens.
- 2017 - Sampson A. & V. Mastroyiannopoulou 2017, Figurines from the Late Neolithic settlement of Ftelia, Mykonos, 30-38, in M. Marthari, C. Renfrew, M. J. Boyd (eds), Early Cycladic Sculpture in Context, Oxbow, 30-38.
