= Cyclops Cave (Youra) =

Cave in the Northern Sporades, Greece

Coordinates: 39.36876685422796°N 24.145709794682325°E

The Cyclops Cave, also called the Cave of the Cyclops, is on the uninhabited islet of Youra (or Gioura), in the Northern Sporades, (20 miles (32 km) from Alonissos) off the coast of Thessaly in Greece. It is the location of an archaeological site with evidence of human occupation from the Mesolithic through the Late Neolithic periods. There is also later material, such as Roman lamps.

The site was excavated beginning in 1992 and continuing into 1996 by a team led by Adamantios Sampson, Inspector of Antiquities, during a project whose more general purpose was to clarify the prehistoric occupation sequence in the area, with an emphasis on the pre-pottery sequences from the Late Pleistocene. Ceramic fragments of painted pottery dated to 6000 BC – 5500 BC were found. Other evidence of human occupation includes the remains of sheep and goats. Excavation of layers of the Mesolithic period found ash and charcoal and an abundance of animal, bird, and fish bones, shells, scales, and a human skull. In this layer were also tools such as millstones and grinders, fish-hooks made from bone and other bone tools. There were also a small number of tools made from obsidian and siliceous rocks.

== Bibliography ==
- Patrick Quinn, Peter Day, Vassilis Kilikoglou, Edward Faber, Stella Katsarou-Tzeveleki, Adamantios Sampson, "Keeping an eye on your pots: the provenance of Neolithic ceramics from the Cave of the Cyclops, Youra, Greece" Journal of Archaeological Science 37:5:1042-1052 (2010) doi:10.1016/j.jas.2009.12.005
- Judith Powell, "Fishing in the Mesolithic and Neolithic—the Cave of Cyclops, Youra", Zooarchaeology in Greece: Recent Advances (2003), British School at Athens Studies 9:75-84 JSTOR 40960334
- Nikos Efstratiou, book review of Adamantios Sampson, The Cave of the Cyclops: Mesolithic and Neolithic Networks in the Northern Aegean, Greece. Vol. 1, Intra-Site Analysis, Local Industries, and Regional Site Distribution ISBN 9781931534208 American Journal of Archaeology 114:1 (January 2010) doi:10.3764/ajaonline114.1.Efstratiou [www.ajaonline.org/book-review/656 full text]
