= Lambayanna =

Lambayanna (Greek: Λαμπάγιαννα) is a submerged Early Bronze Age fortified settlement located in the bay of Kiladha in the Argolis region of the Peloponnese, Greece, near the village of Kiladha. Situated in shallow waters between 1 and 3 meters (3 ft 3 in and 9 ft 10 in) deep, the site covers an estimated marine area of at least 1.2 hectares (3 acres).

== Discovery ==
The site was discovered by chance in the summer of 2014 during the Terra Submersa expedition, a joint research venture conducted by the University of Geneva and the Greek Ephorate of Underwater Antiquities under the aegis of the Swiss School of Archaeology in Greece. Researchers were originally surveying the bay to search for prehistoric, Neolithic or Mesolithic coastal landscapes contemporary with the neighboring Franchthi Cave (c. 9000 BCE). Instead, archaeologists unexpectedly encountered an extensive, built stone infrastructure directly off Lambayanna beach.

== Archaeology and Significance ==
Subsequent sub-aquatic topographical and geophysical surveys revealed orthogonal and circular building foundations, paved stone surfaces interpreted as streets, and an outer fortification system. The most notable structures include massive horseshoe-shaped stone foundations measuring 18 by 10 meters, which are interpreted as integrated defensive towers. Artifacts recovered from the site include Early Helladic pottery, obsidian stone tools, and deep-layer murex shells indicating early purple dye production.

The primary occupation phase of Lambayanna corresponds to the Early Helladic II period, dating to the 3rd millennium BCE (approximately 2700–2200 BCE). The discovery significantly altered Aegean chronology; the settlement's massive stone fortifications and urban scale demonstrate that advanced socio-economic complexity and military architecture existed on the Greek mainland roughly 1,000 years before the rise of the Mycenaean civilization.
