= Maroulas, Kythnos =

Archaeological site in Greece

Maroulas
- Μαρουλάς (Ancient Greek)
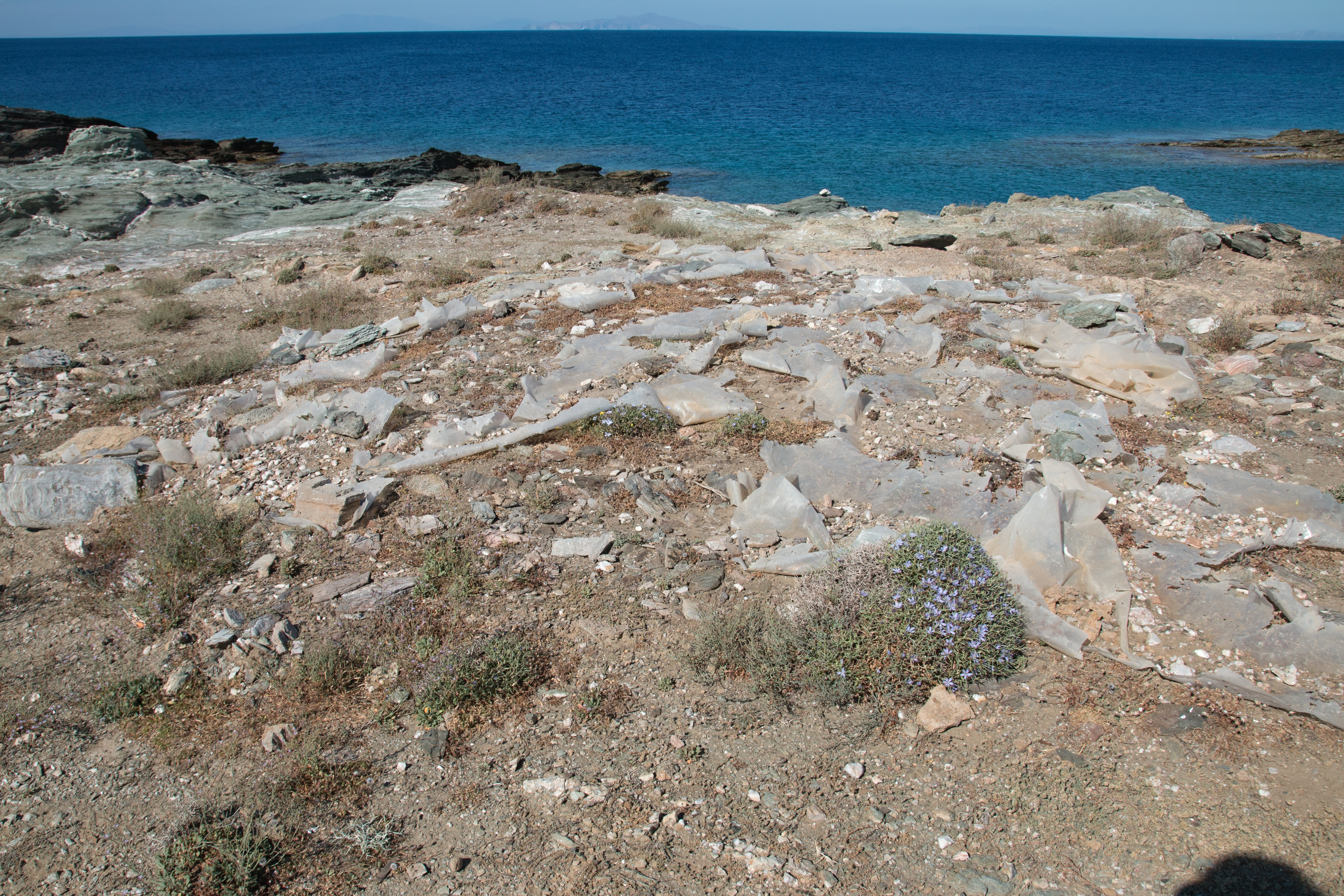
- Interactive map of Maroulas
- Periods: Mesolithic
- Location: Kythnos, Greece

Maroulas is an archaeological site in Kythnos, Greece. It is a Mesolithic settlement located in Loutra and dates back to between 8800 and 8600 BC. Maroulas seems to have been used for a few centuries at the beginning of the 9th millennium BC, and it is considered as the oldest settlement in the island region of the Aegean Sea. The site was identified as a pre-Neolithic settlement in 1975, but this view was contested until the first exploration of the site in 1995. The excavation continued between 2001 and 2005 by the University of the Aegean and the 21st Ephorate of the Cyclades. Architectural structures, tombs, stone tools and food residues of fauna and flora have been discovered at the site.

== General information ==
Maroulas is the only open area Mesolithic settlement whose architectural elements have been preserved. While the sea level was 40–60 meters lower in the Mesolithic period, today the settlement is located at sea level and a significant part of it has been destroyed. It seems to be the only Mesolithic settlement in the Aegean that has been partially spared the rising sea levels as it was not a coastal settlement at that time.

== Architectural structures ==
Based on the excavation data, the buildings of Maroulas were circular in shape with a diameter of 3 to 4 m. Their floors were covered with stones, while some of them were used more than once. Sometimes the structures are found clustered together, as is the case in the central part of the settlement, and elsewhere they are spread out more sparsely . There are 15 or 31 such structures. The majority and the most damaged of structures are located on the eastern side of the settlement adjacent to the sea. The type of circular dwelling at Maroulas was inhabited by groups of hunter-gatherers with a questionable level of permanence, although it appears that there were reconstructions, indicating long-term use. Similar types of dwellings are not found in the context of the Mesolithic period in southeastern Europe.

=== Burial structures ===
At Maroulas there is a diversity of burial structures, judging from those that have been discovered. The existence of secondary graves is mentioned, which refer to burial practices of the Natufian phase, while the placement of the stone over the body is reminiscent of respective examples from Ain Mallaha and El Wad. The burials at Maroulas are part of a limited number of burials of the Mesolithic period in Greece, since burial practices have only been observed in caves at Franchthi in Argolida and at Theopetra in Trikala.

== Stone tools ==
The stone tools of Maroulas were mainly made of local quartz and to a lesser extent of obsidian and flint from Milos. There is a belief that these tools indicate the attempt of the groups to adapt to the use of the local raw materials and, specifically, to quartz. Maroulas shows similarities with other Mesolithic sites in Greece, such as Franchthi Cave, mainly in terms of the emphasis on scale production and of the limited presence of microlithic tools. The use of the obsidian suggests navigation in the Aegean for the supply of raw materials or ready-made tools from Milos.

== Animal and plant remains ==
Remains of pigs, rabbits, birds, etc. were found in the area of the settlement. The inhabitants even fed on fish, sea shells and land molluscs. The archaeobotanical remains are limited to samples of seeds of open steppe plants. However, in one view, the existence of millstones and mortars suggests the presence of morphologically wild cereals, although these have not been identified.

A study of the finds from the swine and fish, based on the seasonality of their births and the period of their fishing respectively, indicates that the settlement was inhabited seasonally, at least from mid-winter to late spring.

== Bibliography ==
- Margarita Arvanitaki (2012). Η αρχή της Νεολιθικής στην Ελλάδα και τα νέα δεδομένα:. doi:10.26262/HEAL.AUTH.IR.129477.
- Olga Karelanidou (2017). Το θέμα της μονιμότητας στην Αρχαιότερη Νεολιθική του βορειοελλαδικού χώρου. doi:10.26262/HEAL.AUTH.IR.295135.
