= Loutra, Kythnos =

Port on the island of Kythnos, Greece

Coordinates: 37°26′31″N 24°25′30″E

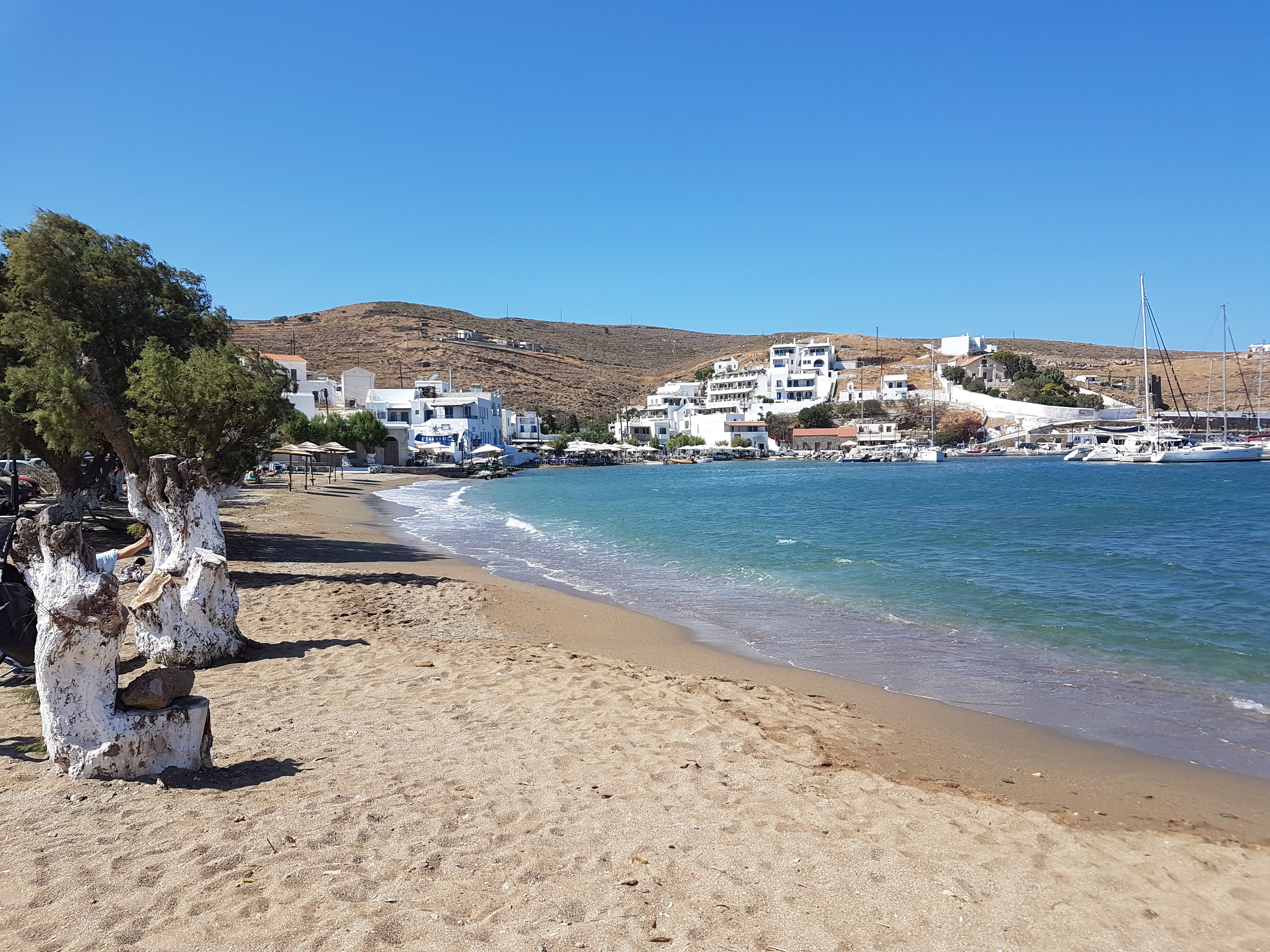
Loutra

Loutra is a traditional seaside settlement and a port in Kythnos, Greece. It is located on the NE part of the island, 5km away from Chora, and 11km from the port of Merihas. Loutra is home to 81 people (according to the 2011 Greek census). The main occupations of the residents are tourism-related services and fishing.

The region of Loutra is mainly known for its hot springs and the 19th c. spa building and its Xenia Hotel. Loutra used to be the main port of the island before the emergence of Merichas. It is also close to the archaeological site of Maroulas.

== Etymology ==
The village of Loutra (the Baths) owes its name to the thermal baths located on the hot springs which were known since the Roman period.

== History ==
Near Loutra is the archaeological site of Maroulas, which includes finds from the Mesolithic period. The area of Loutra has been inhabited since ancient times due to the presence of drinking water and the natural harbour. Since then, Loutra has been known for its thermal springs.

Although the springs had been used since ancient times, the first facilities for exploiting the thermal springs (of Agioi Anargyroi and Kakavos) were built in 1782 during the Ottoman occupation by the dragoman (interpreter) of the Ottoman fleet, Nikolaos Mavrogenis. Then the therapeutic properties of the springs were discovered and following a recommendation from the medical school to modernize the facilities, the construction of the thermal baths complex began. According to the locals, until that point, the inhabitants of modern times used the springs only for treading and for washing blankets and carpets.

The original spa building was completed in 1857 following designs by the architect Christian Hansen and his assistant Laurent, who was in charge of the execution. A few years later, the adjacent tile-roofed neoclassical building was built following designs by Ernest Ziller. The port of Loutra was where the ore from Mount Kakovos was loaded.

Loutra first received electricity in 1932 thanks to a donation from the Kanellopoulos family. In May 1941, during the Axis occupation of Greece, Italian troops landed in Loutra. Loutra started to develop in the 1980s. The village now has a marina and a fishing shelter for fishermen.

== Population ==
According to the 1991 Greek census, Loutra had 142 permanent residents. In 2001, the population had dropped to 63 and by 2011, the population had increased to 81 permanent residents who are engaged in tourism and fishing.

== Water elements ==
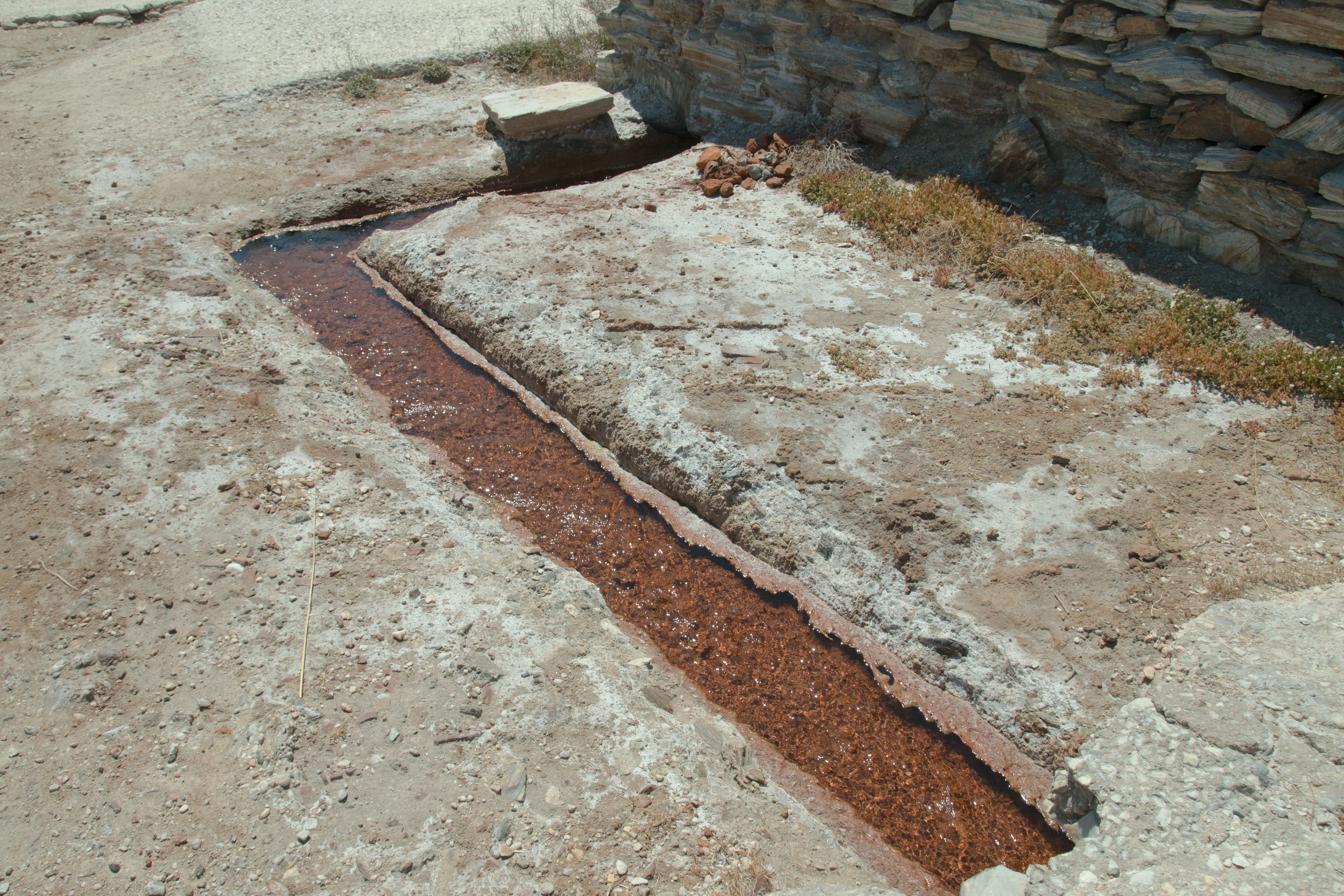
Spring in Loutra

The rocks in the area are generally permeable. Use is made of permeable septic tanks which results in pollution of the water table. Borehole drilling in Loutra demonstrates that the water is potable within acceptable limits, unlike most other areas of Kythnos where it is not.

Loutra has two thermal springs of volcanic origin: Agioi Anargyroi flows into the hydrotherapy center and nearby Kakkavos thermal spring flows directly to the sea.

== Archaeological excavations ==
During excavations, ancient circular dwellings, tombs and a human skeleton were discovered, as well as stone tools made of flint, quartz and obsidian.

== Gallery ==
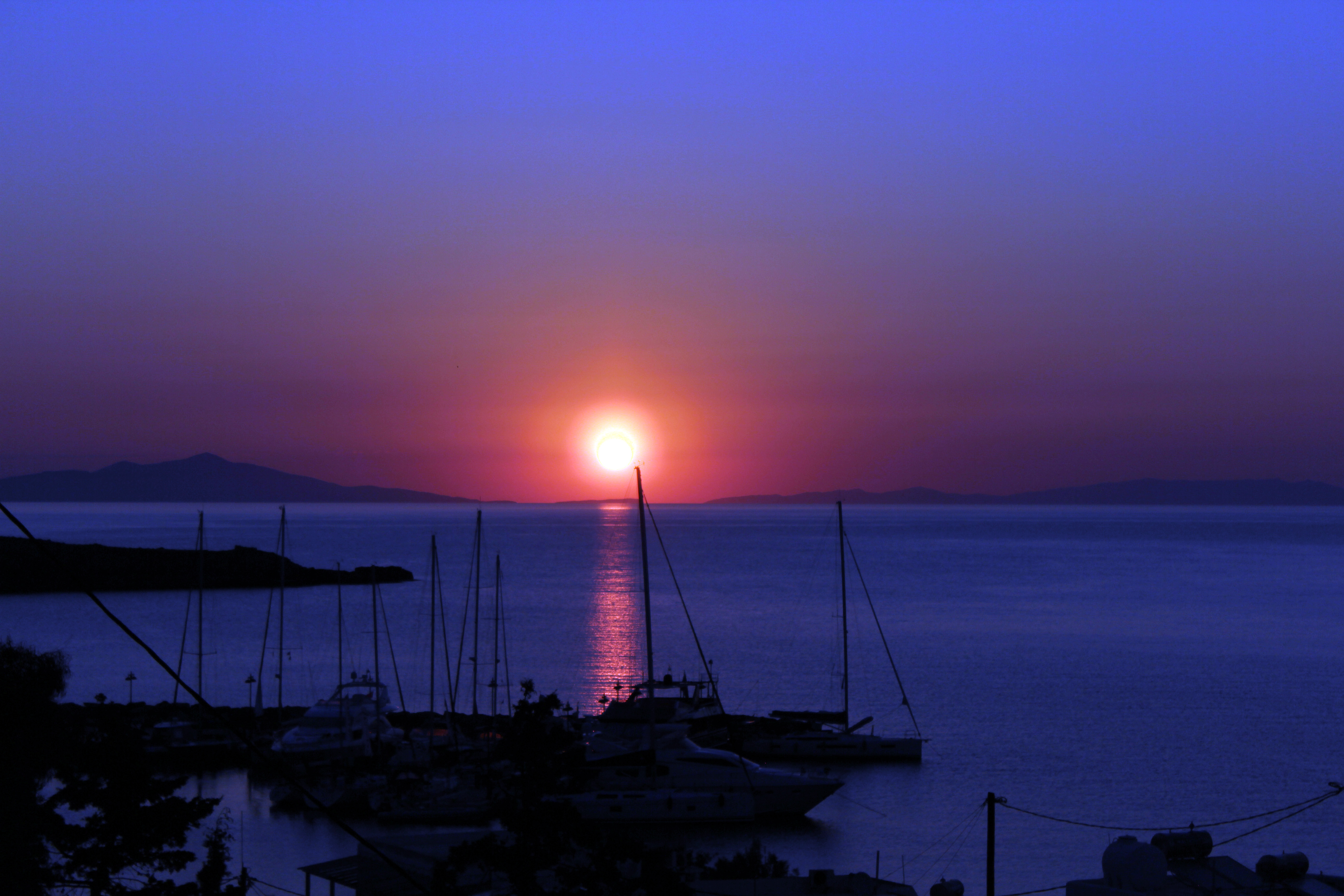
Sunrise in Loutra

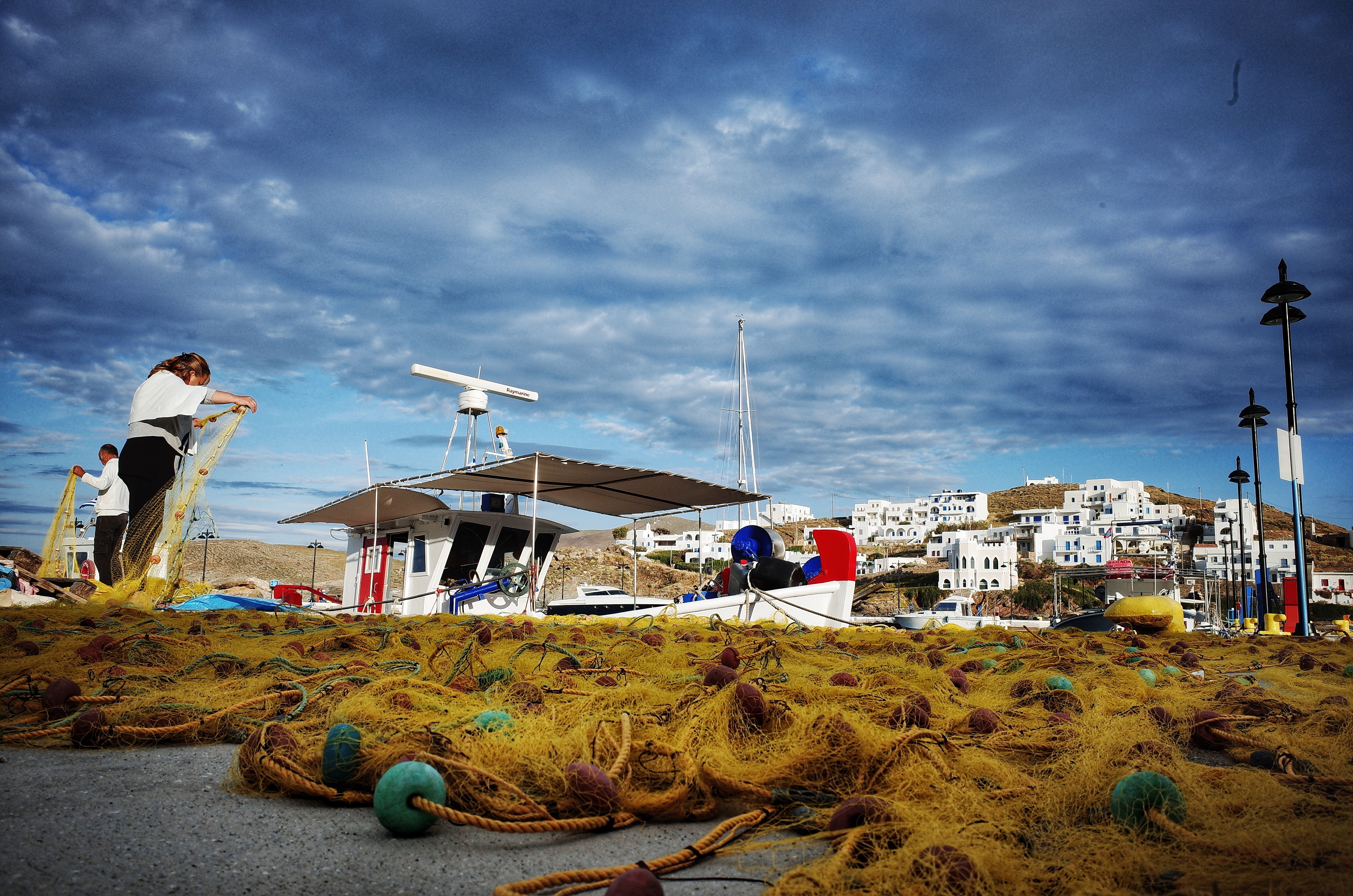
Fishers in Loutra

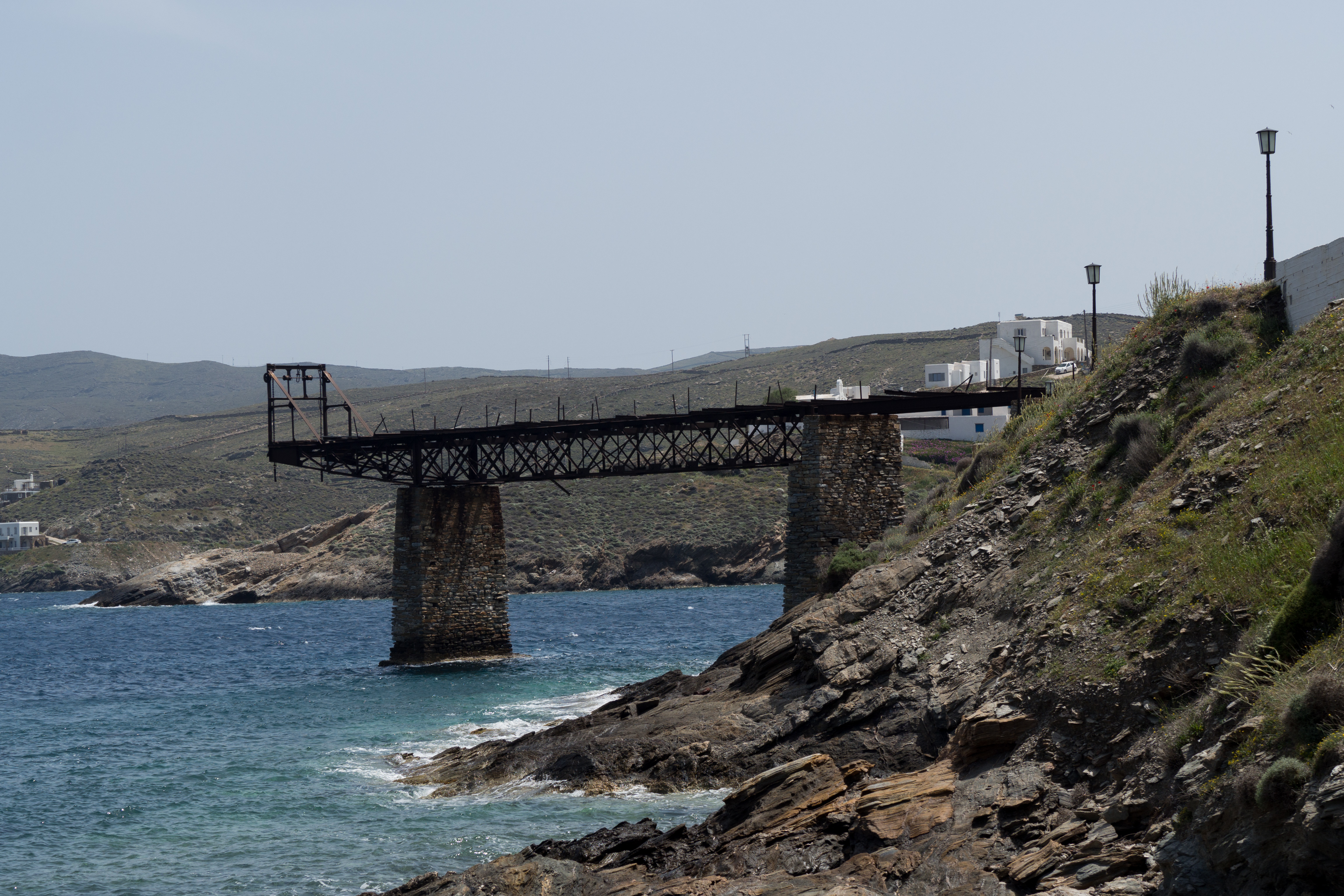
Old metal platform

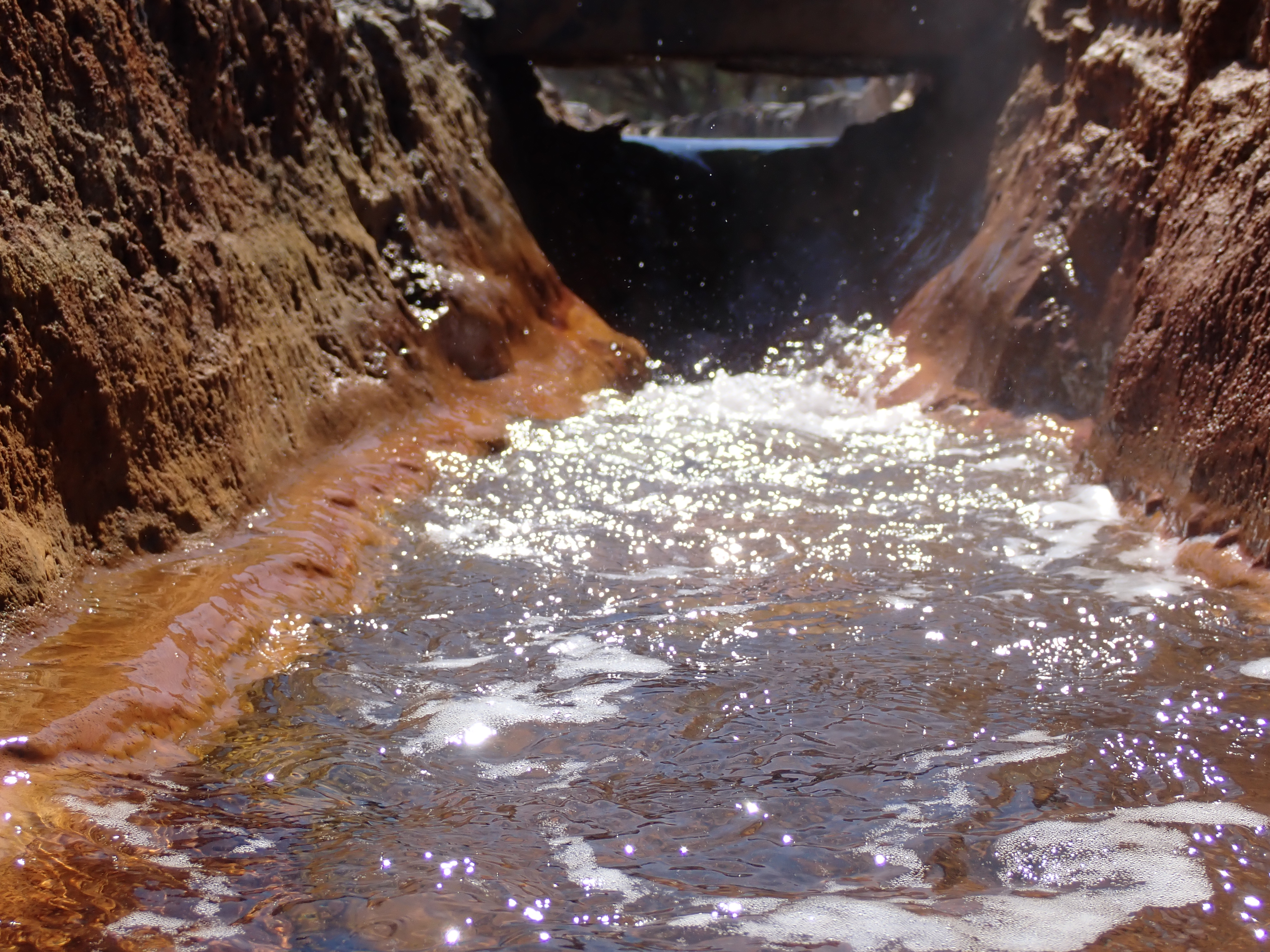
Water from the hot spring

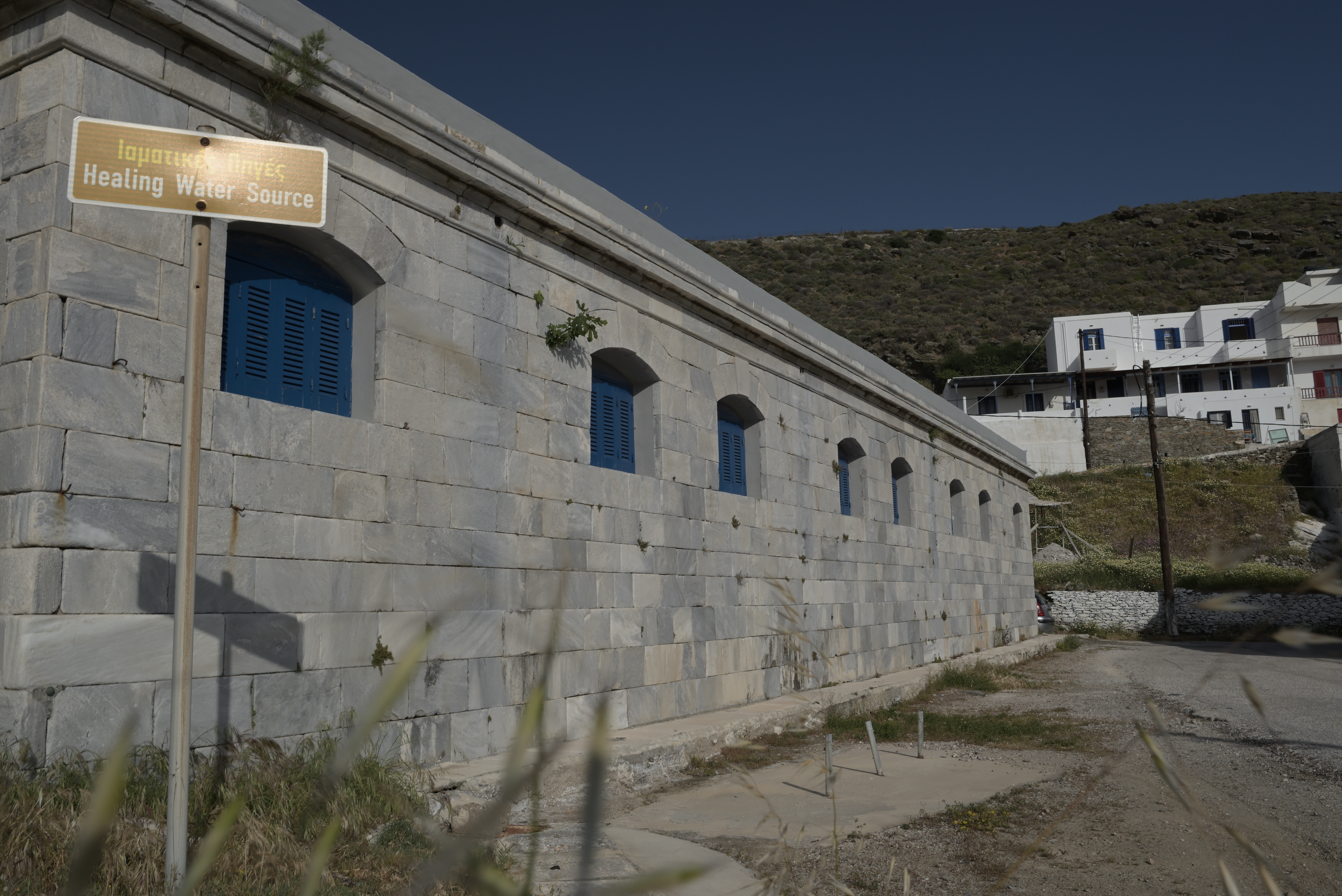
Healing Water Source Facility

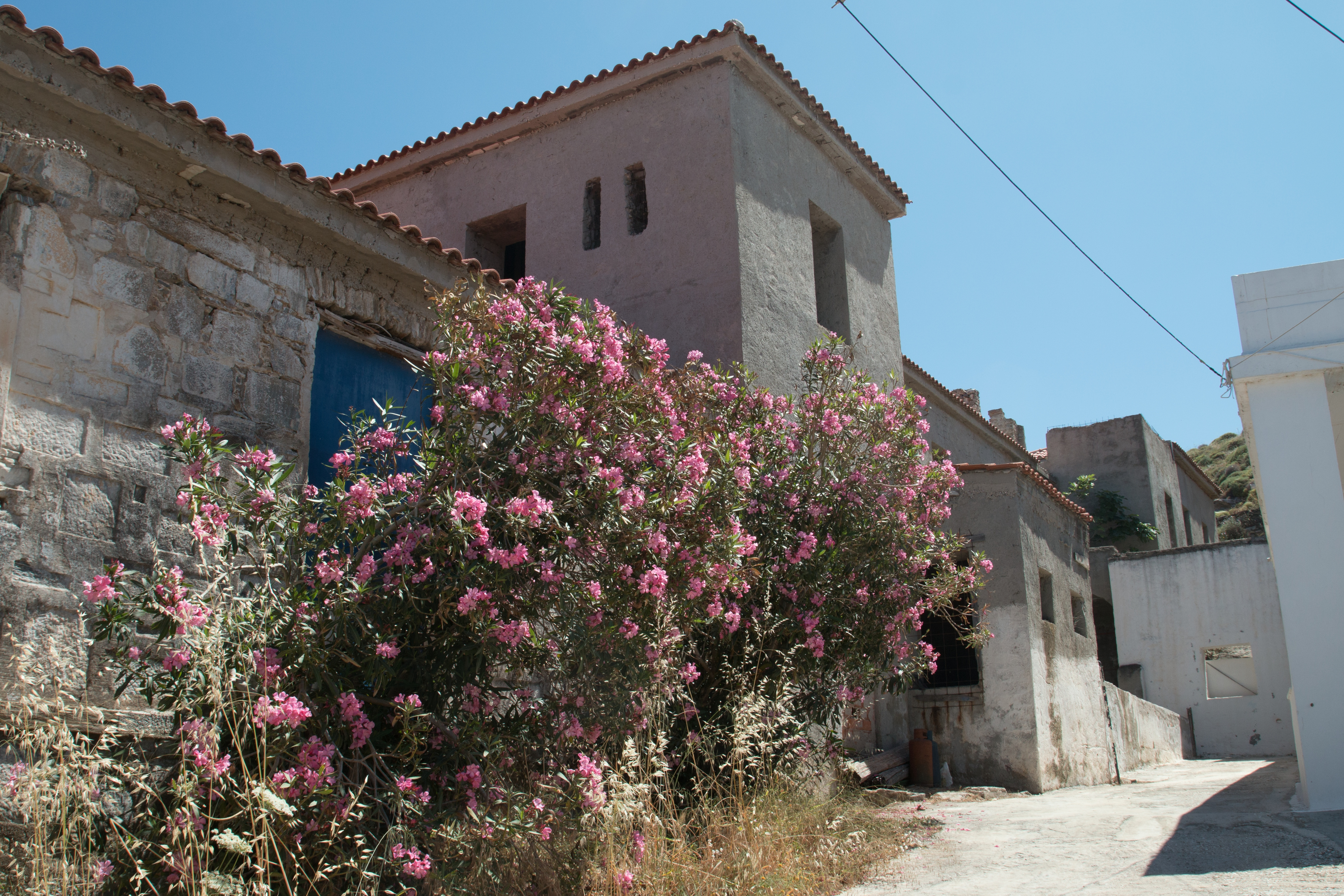
Spa houses

== Bibliography ==
- Filippaiou, Kalliopi G. (2014). «Υδατικοί πόροι με έμφαση στα υπόγεια νερά νήσου Κύθνου». National Technical University of Athens. doi:10.26240/HEAL.NTUA.3900.
- Freely, John (2006). The Cyclades. Discovering the Greek Islands of the Aegean. London: I.B.Tauris & Co. Ltd.
- Hiliadakis, Stelios, Κύθνος, Εκδόσεις Μαθιουδάκη.
- Kokiasmenou, Eleni (2014). «Διαχείριση υδατικών πόρων της Νήσου Κύθνου - διπλωματική εργασία - Ιδρυματικό Αποθετήριο». dias.library.tuc.gr. Technical University of Crete
- Veloudaki, Chrysanthi Anna (2020). Oria Kastro, an insular medieval settlement and fortress on Kythnos: an architectural, archaeological, and historical investigation. The University of Edinburgh-Thesis.
- Οι Κύθνιοι στα χρόνια της Κατοχής 1941-1944 (1995).
- 100 Χρόνια Συνδέσμου Κυθνίων 1901-2001 (2011).
