= Franchthi Cave =

Paleolithic cave in southeastern Greece

- Σπήλαιον Φράγχθι (Greek)
- Frankhthi Cave
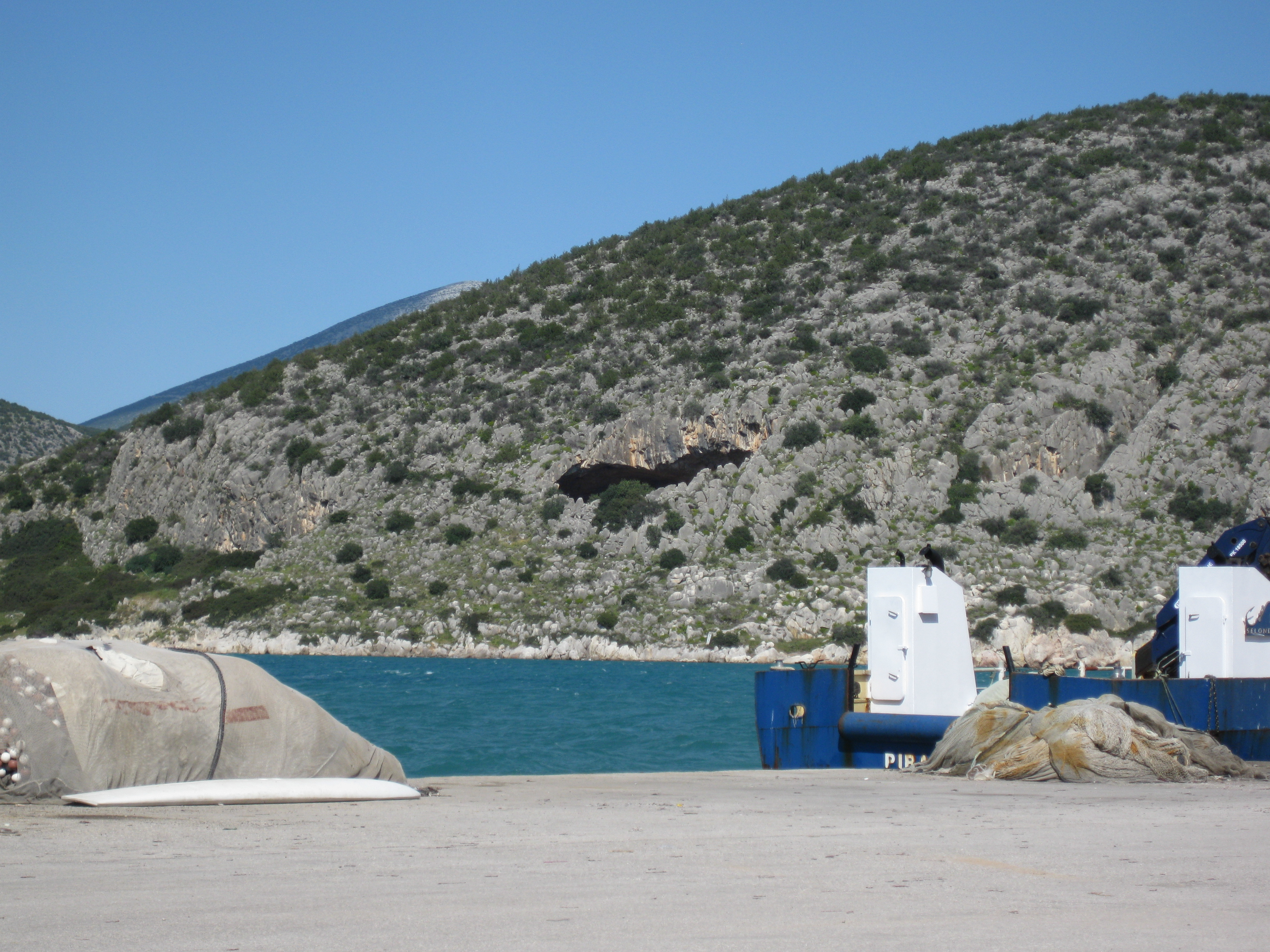
- Entrance to Franchthi Cave seen from Koilada

- Location within Peloponnese Location within Greece
- 37°25′24″N 23°07′56″E
- Periods: Paleolithic to Neolithic
- Location: Koilada, Argolis, Greece
- Region: Argolis

Site notes
- Public access: yes

Franchthi Cave (in gr. Σπήλαιο Φράγχθι) is an archaeological site overlooking Kiladha Bay in the Argolic Gulf, opposite the village of Kiladha in southeastern Argolis, Greece.

The Franchthi Cave has a rich history of early human occupation, beginning in the Upper Paleolithic, and continuing throughout the Mesolithic and Neolithic periods. Last occupied around 3,000 BC, Franchthi was used as a shelter for around 35,000 years and is one of the most comprehensively studied stone age sites in Southeast Europe.

== Notable Archaeological Studies ==
In 1967, T. W. Jacobsen, a professor of classical archaeology and classical studies at Indiana University, began the first excavations at Franchthi Cave. Initially, the dig was only intended as a side project, but it quickly became apparent that the cave was an extremely significant site, and deserved his undivided attention. The study employed many different excavation techniques such as stratigraphic digging, grid-based spatial control, and sieving in order to extract samples. These samples were then subjected to radiocarbon dating and geologic analysis in order to determine their age and other relevant information. The excavation, overseen by Jacobsen, would continue for nearly a decade, ending in 1976.

In 2025, a study was conducted to study the dietary practices of Lower Mesolithic and Middle Neolithic human occupants of the cave. Researchers analyzed isotopic data of amino acids from human and animal remains to differentiate between many different dietary sources. The findings revealed that despite the cave’s coastal location, these prehistoric populations primarily consumed terrestrial animals, and that the harvesting of aquatic resources was minimal or potentially seasonal.

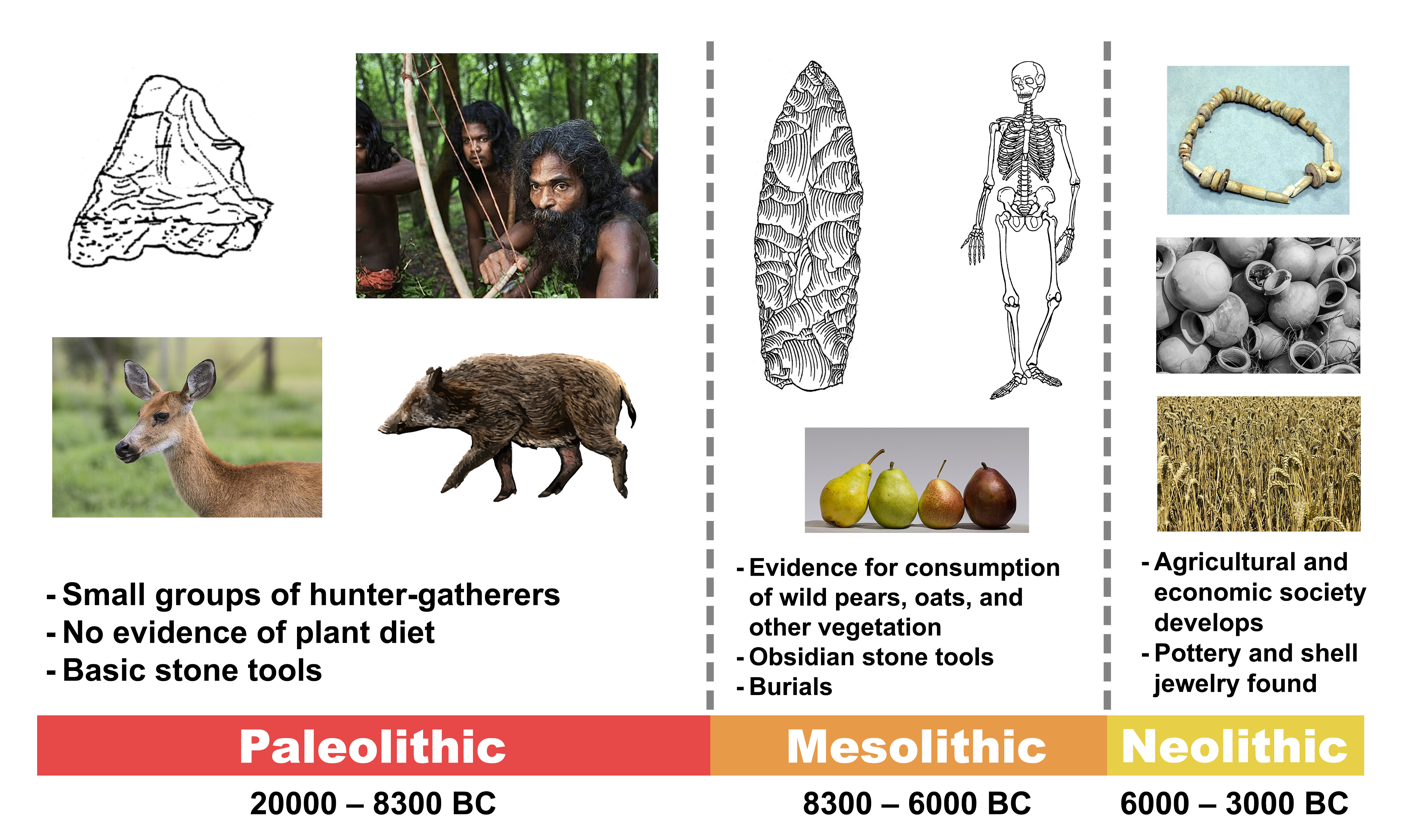
Outline of human practices throughout prehistoric periods of the cave's occupation

These findings also suggest that the landscape around the cave has significantly changed since the Neolithic period. In modern times, rising sea levels have brought the shoreline to the brink of the cave, but during its prehistoric occupation, it was several kilometers away, significantly affecting the availability of marine resources. Additionally, the area that has since been submerged under Kiladha Bay was once a fertile plain with plentiful terrestrial hunting grounds and agricultural land ripe for human use, proving the harvesting of marine foods unnecessary.

== Paleolithic Occupation ==
During much of its occupation, the Franchthi Cave was significantly further from the coastline than it is today. This is because sea levels have risen significantly since the time period of inhabitance, around 120 metres (400 ft) . These ancient inhabitants looked out on a large coastal plain that was slowly submerged over the course of their occupation.

During the Upper Paleolithic Franchthi Cave was seasonally occupied by a small group (or groups), probably in the range of 25–30 people, who mainly hunted wild ass and red deer (with no evidence of gathering wild plants), carrying a stone tool kit of flint bladelets and scrapers. Its use as a campsite increased considerably after the Last Glacial Maximum (around 20,000 years ago), with occasional abandonment during the sequence of occupation.

There is evidence that suggests ancient mariners - such as Homo erectus or Homo heidelbergensis – may have even reached Crete at least 130,000 years ago. Obsidian from the island of Melos appears at Franchthi as early as 13,000 BC, offering the earliest evidence of seafaring and navigational skills by anatomically modern humans in Greece.

A sudden shift in hunting occurred for these residents during the Upper Paleolithic, as they transitioned to a distinctly marine and terrestrial diet during this time. Sea level had begun to rise significantly, and fishing activities continued to become a more prevalent part of their diet into the Mesolithic.

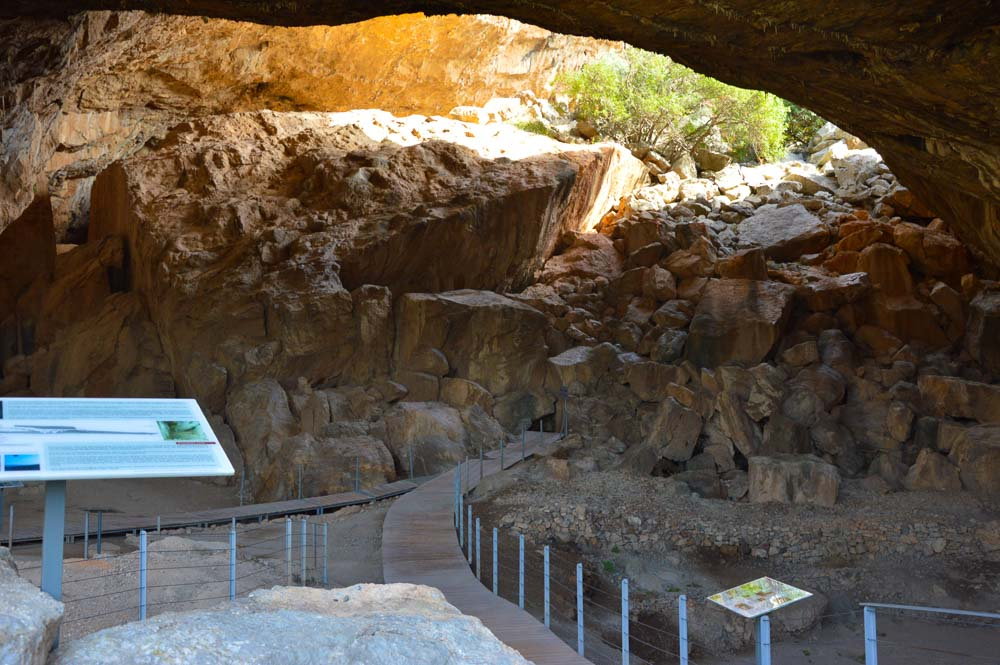
View looking into the cave

== Mesolithic Occupation ==
An apparent break in the occupation of Franchthi Cave occurred during the Younger Dryas climate cooling event, after which a Mesolithic culture appeared as the world settled into the warm Holocene climate, a global temperature stabilization that continued for the rest of Franchthi Cave’s habitation but has begun to change in recent centuries due to human-caused climate change. The Mesolithic is represented by only a few sites in Greece, and, like Franchthi, nearly all of them are close to the coast. Sea level continued to rise throughout this period and the inhabitant population did not rely as heavily on big game as their Paleolithic predecessors, probably due to the changing climate and environment; instead they broadened their resource base to include a variety of small game, wild plants, fish and mollusks. The evidence of an expanding diet of fish and increased use of more complex stone tools and obsidian from Melos at Franchthi during this period shows the occupants had become accomplished seafarers. There is a notable stretch spanning several hundred years (circa 7,900 – 7,500 BC) when tuna became a major part of the diet at Franchthi Cave, implying deep sea fishing. It has also been suggested that the tuna could have been caught by placing nets near the shore. The cave became not only a site for occupation but burial as well, as mortuary practices (like burying the dead with personal items) are observed in the archaeological record during this time period.

== Neolithic Occupation ==
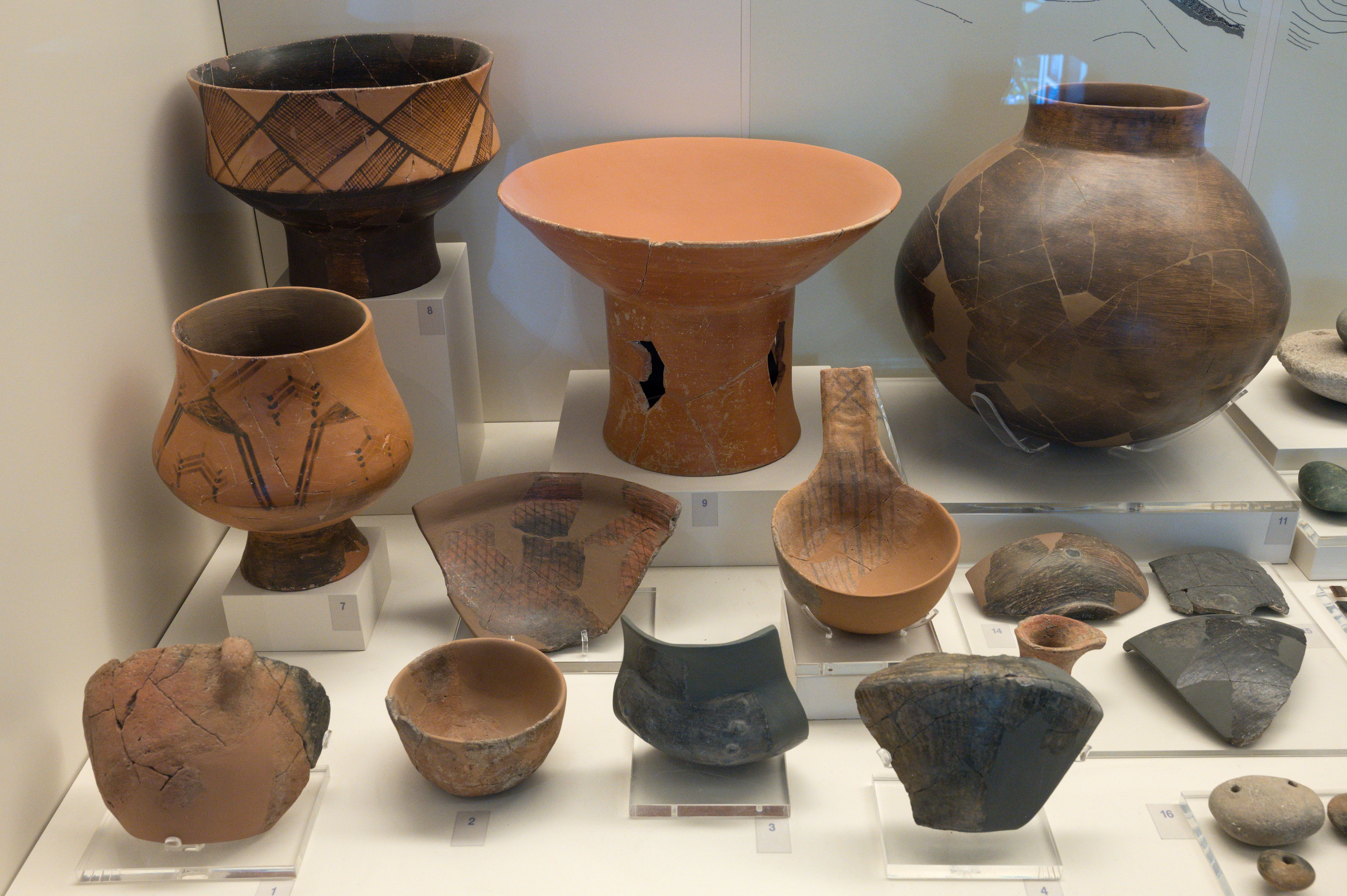
Neolithic pottery from the cave

The cave also contains some of the earliest evidence for agriculture in Greece. Around 7,000 BC, the remains of domesticated plants and animals are found within the cave, interspersed with the usual wild plant and animal species that were hunted and gathered during the Mesolithic, suggesting that either the inhabitants of Franchthi had begun to practice agriculture or were trading for seeds and meat with the Neolithic people who had recently arrived from the Near East. There has been some debate about whether agriculture developed locally in Greece or if it was introduced by peoples from other parts of the world, but experts now generally believed that emigrants from the Pre-Pottery Neolithic B cultures of the Near East arrived by boat at the beginning of the seventh millennium BC to settle Greece (c. 6900 BC), introducing agriculture. For some time the evidence from Franchthi was used as an example in support of locally developed agriculture, but more detailed study of the remains has demonstrated that the evidence supports the foreign introduction of domesticated plants and animals. Whatever the source, agricultural practices took off in the area inside and around the cave; sheep and goats suddenly appear and begin to immediately dominate the faunal presence as wild game and fish drop off dramatically. The Mesolithic hunter-gatherers of Greece rapidly adopted the methods introduced to them by these Neolithic immigrants, including the hunter-gatherers at Franchthi Cave, and it is clear that these peoples had not only become agricultural, but developed an economic society as well.

During the Neolithic, the main occupancy of the cave shifted to an area outside the entrance, called the Paralia (the seaside), where terracing walls for growing crops were built. It is believed the inhabitants also occupied a village below the Paralia, which is now submerged beneath the sea. Several anthropomorphic and zoomorphic figurines have been recovered at Franchthi from the Neolithic era, and it has been suggested that the site may have served as a workshop for making cockle-shell beads to trade with inland communities during the Early Neolithic. Remains of residential substantial walls, evidently from permanent residence structures, have also been found in the immediate area outside the cave, providing very strong evidence of an early sedentary Neolithic community; more excavation needs to be conducted in this area, but it is estimated that this was quite a large village and extends down to the shoreline and even beneath the current waterline, as is the case with other ancient settlements in the area.

== The Bay of Kiladha Project and Underwater Villages ==
In 2012, a search was launched in the area of Kiladha Bay (where the Franchthi Cave is located) for any evidence of a large submerged, Neolithic village. The Bay of Kiladha Project is a collaboration between the University of Geneva and the Greek Ephorate of Underwater Antiquities. Its first step was to conduct coring, sampling, and charting to create a detailed map of "the paleo-shorelines and submerged prehistoric landscapes of the late Pleistocene and Early Holocene..." for use in discovering traces of prehistoric human activity. This study of the seafloor involved two research vessels: the Alkyon from the Hellenic Center for Marine Research, and PlanetSolar, currently the world's largest solar-powered boat, which was commissioned by the University of Geneva for its Terra Submersa program.

In 2014 the Terra Submersa team, led by Julien Beck, was waiting for permission to conduct their survey of the Franchthi area of Kiladha Bay. To bide their time they ran some training dives several hundred metres north, just outside the mouth of the Bay, at Lambayanna Beach. These dives revealed very old pottery fragments and odd seafloor anomalies that piqued their interest. Returning in 2015 for a more thorough investigation, they found the ruins of an Early Bronze Age city; the site spans 1.2 ha (3.0 acres) and lies beneath 1 and 3 m (3 and 10 ft) of water. It includes the foundations of buildings, stone paved surfaces that are likely roads, and what appear to be the remains of a fortification wall with three large towers. Such a defensive structure would be the first of its kind to be discovered from the Early Bronze Age in Greece. The visible remains of Lambayanna are dated to the Early Helladic II era (c. 2650 – c. 2200 BC), making it a contemporary of the House of the Tiles at Lerna, the building of the Great Pyramids, and both the Cycladic and Minoan cultures of the nearby Aegean islands. A second layer of Lambayanna has been identified as Early Helladic I (c. 3200 – c. 2650 BC), and a third layer has revealed pottery that dates all the way back to an intermediary period between the Bronze Age and the Neolithic, suggesting not only that the site is well over 5,000 years old, but that it may have had an overlapping relationship with the Neolithic Franchthi community. There is also a prehistoric riverbed that runs through the coastal plain, going right past the Franchthi Cave and other surrounding villages; it is conjectured by experts that this ancient river influenced the settlement and sedentary occupation of this area.

In 2020 and 2021, the team returned to explore and survey the area more extensively. In the Lambayanna sector, the Early Bronze Age settlement yielded numerous finds, most notably pottery and stone tools that were taken back to Athens for further analysis and storage. The Bay of Kiladha Project continues to study the find at Lambayanna, while maintaining its search for a prehistoric settlement directly off the shore of Franchthi Cave.
