= Alonnisos Marine Park =

Marine protected area in the Aegean sea, Greece

National Marine Park of Alonnisos Northern Sporades
- IUCN category II (national park)
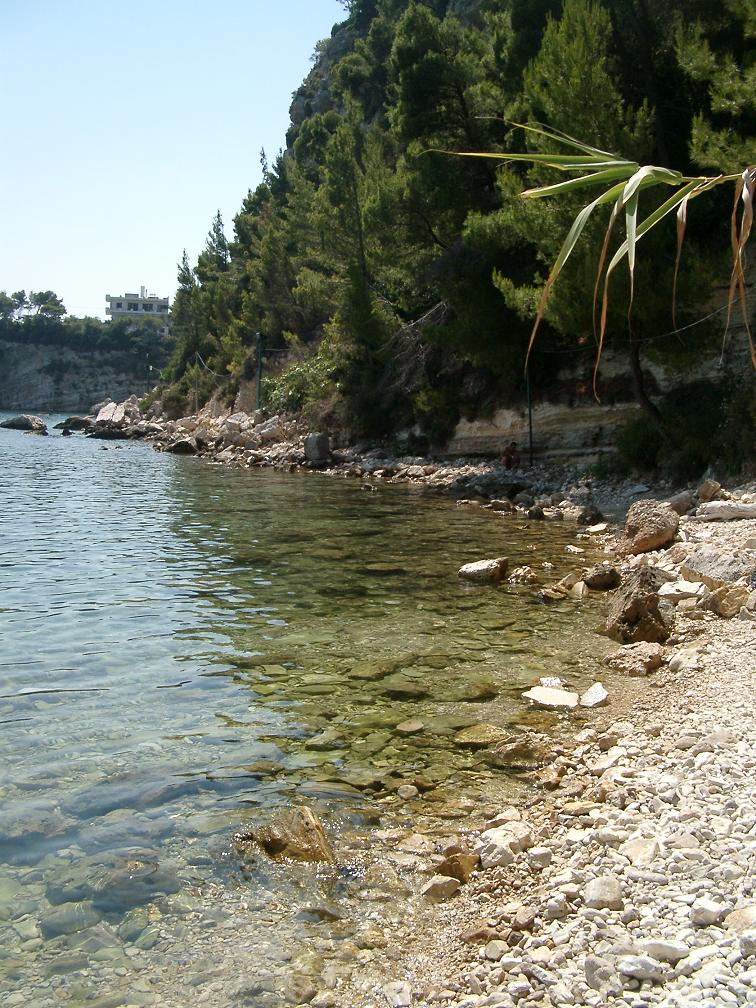
- Beach in Alonnisos

- Location within Greece
- Interactive map of National Marine Park of Alonnisos Northern Sporades
- Location: Greece, Europe
- Nearest city: Volos
- Coordinates: 39.307100°N 24.147606°E
- Area: 2,260 km^{2} (870 sq mi)
- Established: May 16, 1992
- Governing body: joint venture between ministries

The National Marine Park of Alonnisos Northern Sporades (Greek: Εθνικό Θαλάσσιο Πάρκο Αλοννήσου Βορείων Σποράδων, ΕΘΠΑΒΣ) was founded in Greece by Presidential Decree on May 16, 1992. It was the first of its kind in the country, and is currently the largest marine protected area in Europe (approximately 2,260 km^{2}). Besides the sea area, the park includes the island of Alonnisos, six smaller islands (Peristera, Kyra Panagia, Gioura, Psathoura, Piperi and Skantzoura), as well as 22 uninhabited islets and rocky outcrops. It is located in the region of the Northern Sporades Islands, in the northern Aegean Sea. There is one other marine park in Greece, namely Zakynthos Marine Park.

== History ==
Thomas Schultze-Westrum, a German zoologist and maker of animal documentaries, after a series of exploratory missions to the islands in 1976, noted the great ecological and biological value for the first time and proposed the creation of protected area. Six years later, the local fishermen of Alonnisos Island accepted, after consultation, the prospect of establishing a park in the region and were committed to help with its protection. In 1986 the Magnesia Prefecture issued the first order to protect the region, followed by the decisions of the Ministries of Environmental Affairs, Agriculture and Merchant Navy. The newly formed Hellenic Society for the Study and Protection of the Monk seal (MOm), composed of young marine biologists, in 1990 set up a permanent team field in the area of the reserve and acquired the research vessel IFAW-ODYSSEAS to aid to the systematic monitoring of the population of the Mediterranean monk seal (Monachus monachus), which remained so until 2006. A year later they established in Alonnisos the first seal health centre for the species in the Mediterranean.

The presidential decree, that was issued to clearly demarcate the protected zones and protection measures, overlooked the creation of a local Reserve Management Agency. MOm, aided by the European Commission, initiated the reserve's support and monitor program. This action is implemented with the local operators of the high-speed craft Alonnisos and the first few years in close cooperation with the Fishing Cooperative of Alonnisos. Following the environmental study that lasted several years issued by a Joint Ministerial Decision which set out the composition of the board of the management agency of the marine park, the overall responsibility for managing the reserve passed to the new management agency. MOm participates as a full member of the board, the Operational Management Council, however, without a clearly defined plan of operation, with lack of funding and some unfortunate choice of a president of the board for the next three years remained ineffective. In 2007, some funding by the Third EU Community Support Framework initiated the first steps of operation. The current situation is critical, since the choices to be made and management actions to be implemented will determine both the credibility of the new management agency and the protection of the coastal region.

== Geography ==
=== Geology ===
Limestone rock dominates the island surfaces. Its main characteristics are the steep rocky slopes which run down to the sea and the caves, which are an important part of the habitat of the monk seal. Different types of soil are encountered while fresh water sources are scarce.

=== Climate ===
Mediterranean, with moderate rainfall during wintertime and long dry summers. The average annual temperature is 17 °C and the average rainfall is 515 mm. During August, the meltemia, average to very strong northerly winds, refresh the atmosphere and cause significant disturbance at sea.

=== Special conditions ===
The geographic isolation of the area, its morphology, the limited degree of human interference and the excellent condition of the natural environment make the land and sea areas of the park an ideal habitat for many threatened species of plants and animals

=== Flora ===
The islands are covered in Mediterranean coniferous forest and macchia vegetation such as the strawberry tree, phillyrea, the heather, rhamnus, the kermes oak, often in the form of treelike shrubs, and evergreen trees such as the maple, the wild olive, the Phoenician juniper and the rare tree Amelanchier chelmea. Phrygana is also common and consists of many species. Of particular interest are the chasmophytes with several endemic species such as Campanula reiseri, Linum gyaricum, Arenaria phitosiana and others. Underwater sea-grass beds of Posidonia oceanica, which is particularly important for the development of other organisms and the retention and cycling of suspended particles and various substances in the marine environment, are widely spread and in good condition.

=== Fauna ===
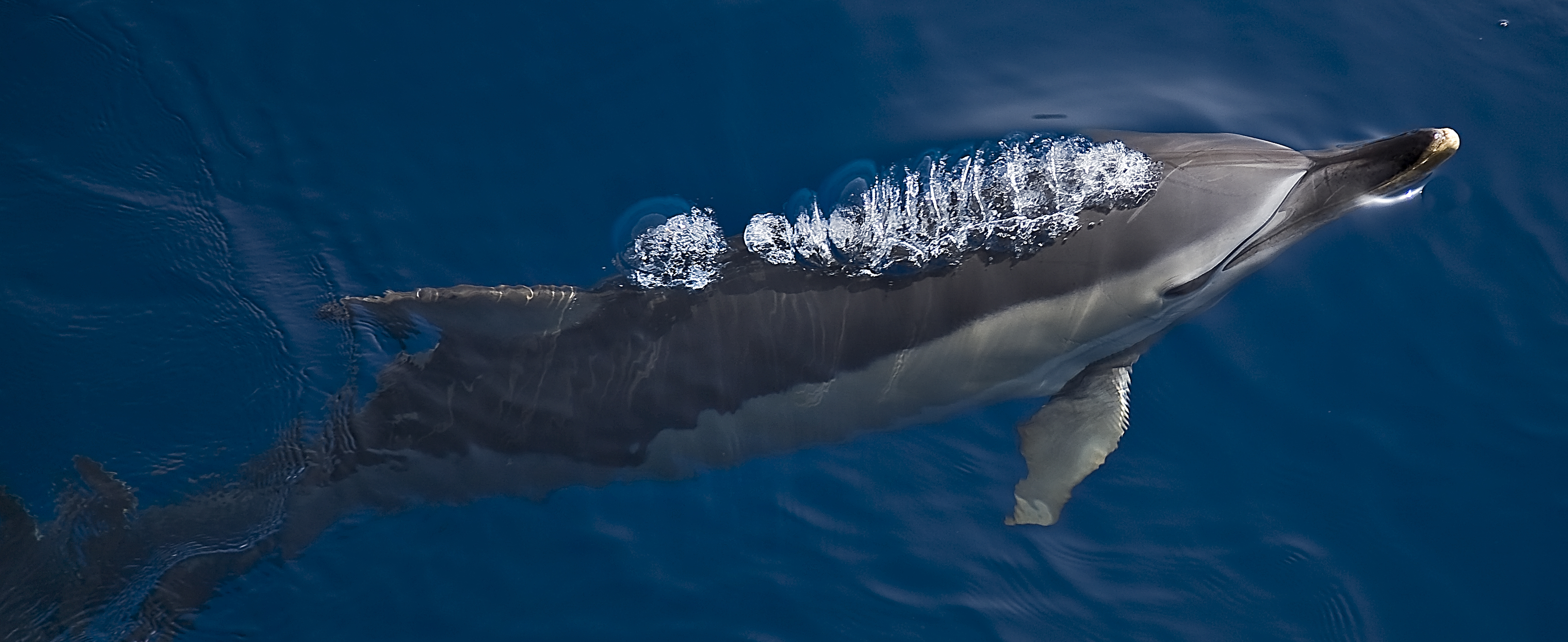
Common Dolphin swimming in the park water

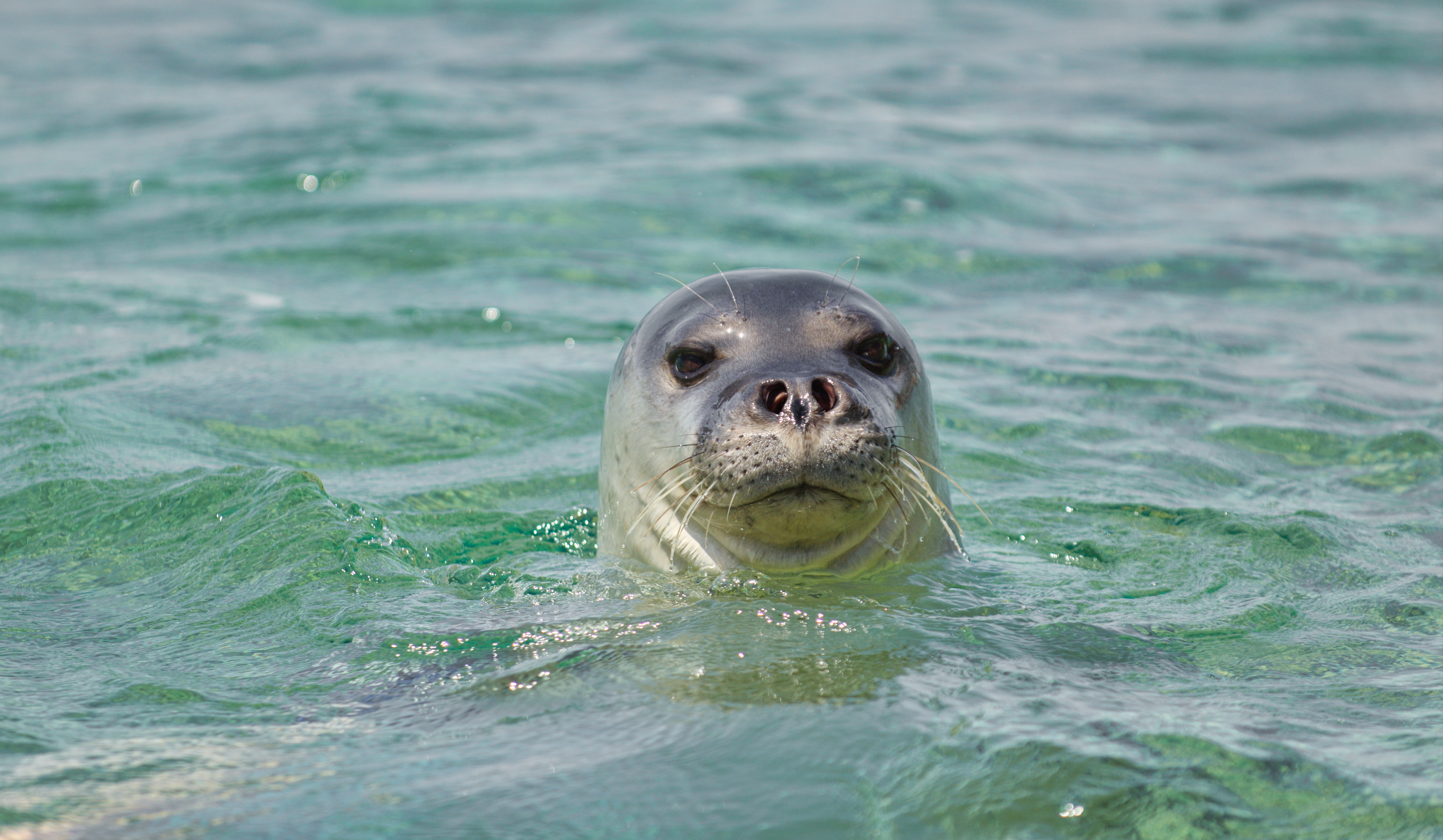
Mediterranean monk seal swimming in the park water

The area of the AMP is an important habitat for many species of fish (about 300), birds (up to 80 species), reptiles and also mammals. Apart from the monk seal, the red coral (Corallium rubrum), Eleonora's falcon (Falco eleonorae), Audouin's gull (Larus audouinii), shag (Gulosus aristotelis), and the wild goat of Gioura (Capra aegagrus), are few of the most characteristic rare species to be found. Some of the birds to be seen are the Bonelli's eagle (Hieraetus fasciatus), the cormorant (Phalacrocorax carbo) and the white gull (Larus michahelis), and nesting among the rocks, the Apus apus and Apus melba, the rock nuthatch (Sitta neumayer), etc. The existing flora also favours the presence of species of the family Sylvidae, e.g. the Sardinian warbler (Sylvia melanocephala) and the blackcap (Sylvia atricapilla). Underwater fauna is also varied, with many benthic and fish species. Various species of dolphins and some whale species may be seen in the region, such as the common dolphin (Delphinus delphis), the striped dolphin (Stenella coeruleoalba), the bottlenose dolphin (Tursiops truncatus), the long-finned pilot whale (Globicephala melas), the sperm whale (Physeter macrocephalus) and the Cuvier's beaked whale (Ziphius cavirostris).

== Protective measures ==
=== Zone A (1587 km^{2}) ===
==== Zone A1 Piperi Island and the surrounding waters to a distance of 3 nautical miles ====
Permitted activities: Scientific research (under licences), park operations (under licences), maintenance works to the church of Zoothohos Pigis and the adjacent spring, herding. Forbidden activities: Agricultural activities, the use of fire or chemicals and other substances, all kinds of professional fishing, amateur fishing, vessel approach and mooring.

=== Zone B (678 km^{2}) ===
The entire area of Zone B is open to visits and there are no specific restrictions, with the exception of free camping and the lighting of fires. Swimming and walking are amongst the simplest and most interesting ways of coming in contact with the natural environment. In addition, amateur fishing is allowed according to the rules laid down in the Fisheries Code.

There are communities in Zone B, the largest being Patitiri, Palia Alonnisos, Votsi and Steni Vala.

== See also ==
- Alonissos Underwater Museum
- Hawaiian monk seal
- Caribbean monk seal
- Foça
