= Adelfoi Islets =

Group of islands in the Aegean Sea

Native name: Αδελφοί
- Location within Greece

Geography
- Coordinates: 39.12°N 23.98°E
- Archipelago: Sporades
- Total islands: 2
- Highest elevation: 50 m (160 ft)

Administration
- Greece
- Region: Thessaly
- Regional unit: Sporades

Demographics
- Population: 11 (2001)

Additional information
- Postal code: 370 05
- Area code: 24240
- Vehicle registration: BO

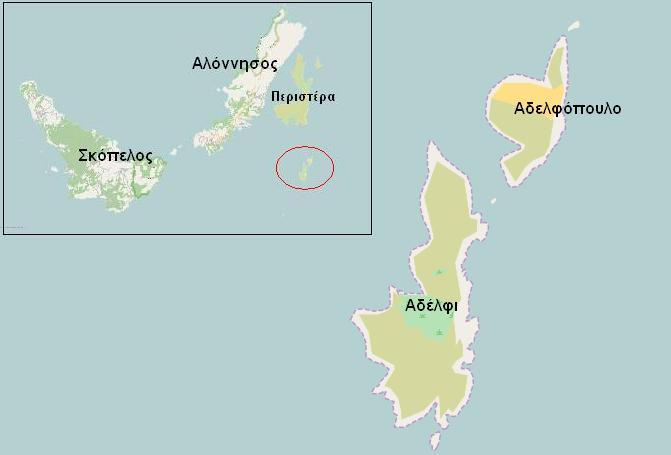

The Adelfoi Islets (Greek: Αδελφοί, "brothers") are two Greek islands in the Sporades. They are located about 10 kilometres (6.2 mi) east-southeast of the main island of Alonnisos and also administered by the municipality of the same main island name. The 2001 census reported a population of eleven inhabitants.

== Nearest islands and islets ==
Its nearest islands and islets are Alonnisos and Peristera, Skantzoura to the east and Euboea further south.
