= List of shipwrecks in November 1890 =

The list of shipwrecks in November 1890 includes ships sunk, foundered, grounded, or otherwise lost during November 1890.

== 1 November ==
List of shipwrecks: 1 November 1890
Ship	State	Description
Angers	United Kingdom	The steamship ran aground in the Elbe at "Stielhuck". She was on a voyage from Hamburg, Germany to Philadelphia, Pennsylvania, United States.
Drachenfels	Germany	The steamship ran aground in the Elbe at Finkenwerder. She was on a voyage from Hamburg to Bombay, India. She was refloated on 3 November and taken in to Brunshausen.
Familia	Denmark	The schooner was abandoned in the Baltic Sea. Her crew were rescued by the schooner Bonden (Flag unknown). Familia was on a voyage from Gävle, Sweden to Bremen, Germany.
John Milne	United Kingdom	The steam hopper barge sprang a leak and foundered 12 nautical miles (22 km) off the South Rock Lighthouse, County Down. Her crew were rescued by the steamship Sligo (United Kingdom). John Milne was on a voyage from Renfrew to Port Natal, Natal Colony.
Kate Forster	United Kingdom	The steamship ran aground on the Burrows Sand, in the North Sea off the coast of Essex. She was refloated the next day.
Ladons, and Strimon	Romania	The lighters struck rocks in the Danube upstream of Silistria and were beached.
Leona	United States	The steamship caught fire at New York and was severely damaged.
Sensation	United Kingdom	The schooner ran aground on the Shipwash Sand, in the North Sea off the coast of Suffolk. She was refloated with assistance from the smack Alpha and the yawl Jane (both United Kingdom) and resumed her voyage.
Vanadis	Norway	The barque collided with the steamship Kaiser (United Kingdom) in the Elbe at Schulau and was severely damaged. Vanadis was on a voyage from Hamburg to Savannah, Georgia, United States.

== 2 November ==
List of shipwrecks: 2 November 1890
Ship	State	Description
Beta	United Kingdom	The schooner was driven ashore and wrecked on Goatness Point, Lothian. She was on a voyage from London to Leith, Lothian.
Ciscar	Spain	The steamship struck a rock and sprang a leak. She was on a voyage from Hamburg, Germany to Vigo.
Gudrun	United Kingdom	The brigantine ran aground near Lymington, Hampshire. She was on a voyage from London to the Rio Grande. She was refloated the next day.
Hazard	Norway	The brigantine was driven ashore and wrecked on Inagua, Bahamas. She was on a voyage from Haiti to Hamburg.
H. von Witt	Germany	The steamship ran aground at Barsebäck, Sweden. She was on a voyage from London, United Kingdom to Rostock. She was refloated with assistance and taken in to Copenhagen, Denmark.
Katherine	United Kingdom	The schooner was drive ashore and wrecked near Alnmouth, Northumberland. Her five crew were rescued. She was on a voyage from Bo'ness, Lothian to Poole, Dorset.
Kosmos	Norway	The barque was wrecked on Anholt, Denmark. Her crew were rescued. She was on a voyage from Skellefteå, Sweden to Plymouth, Devon, United Kingdom.
Manna	Norway	The steamship caught fire in the North Sea and was abandoned with the loss of one of her ten crew. Survivors were rescued by the steam trawler Cinerara and the smack James Emptage (both United Kingdom).
Marchiani	Italy	The barque collided with the steamship Hereford (United Kingdom) at Sulina, Romania and was severely damaged.
Morning Light	United Kingdom	The schooner collided with the steamship Lady Mostyn (United Kingdom) and foundered off "Eccles". Her crew survived.
Nanna	Norway	The steamship caught fire in the North Sea off Spurn Head, Yorkshire, United Kingdom and was abandoned by her crew, who were rescued by two smacks. She was on a voyage from Hamburg, Germany to Grimsby, Lincolnshire, United Kingdom. She was towed in to Grimsby by the tug Champion (United Kingdom).
Normandy	Flag unknown	The steamship was driven ashore on Île Sainte-Marie, Madagascar. She was refloated and taken in to Tamatave in a leaky condition.
Semaria	Norway	The barque was driven ashore at Kastrup, Denmark. She was on a voyage from Härnösand, Sweden to London, United Kingdom. She was refloated and taken in to Helsingør, Denmark.
Whitehall	United Kingdom	The steamship departed from Bilbao, Spain for the River Mersey. No further trace, presumed foundered with the loss of all fifteen hands. Possibly the ship that collided with Lough Fisher (United Kingdom) on 5 November.
Unnamed	Flag unknown	The ship foundered in the Bristol Channel off Ilfracombe, Devon, United Kingdom.

== 3 November ==
List of shipwrecks: 3 November 1890
Ship	State	Description
Beta	United Kingdom	The schooner was driven ashore and wrecked east of Dunbar, Lothian. Her four crew survived. She was on a voyage from London to Leith, Lothian.
Betty Sauber, and Munroe	Germany; United Kingdom	The steamships collided in the Elbe at Lühe. Betty Sauber was beached. She was on a voyage from Hamburg to Grangemouth, Stirlingshire. Monroe was severely damaged. She was on a voyage from a port in Sierra Leon to Hamburg.
Clara Felicia	United Kingdom	The schooner was driven ashore at Weaver Point, County Cork.
Draper	United Kingdom	The schooner was driven ashore. She was on a voyage from Newcastle upon Tyne, Northumberland to London. She was refloated and towed in to Great Yarmouth, Norfolk in a severely leaky condition.
Elsie	Netherlands	The schooner was abandoned off Gotland, Sweden, being in a sinking condition. Her crew were rescued by the steamship Absalon (Denmark). Elsie was on a voyage from Härnösand, Sweden to Delfzijl, Groningen.
Guiding Star	United Kingdom	The schooner ran aground at Batavia, Netherlands East Indies. She was a total loss.
Harry Herbert	United Kingdom	The schooner collided with the steam trawler Dolphin (United Kingdom) at Milford Haven, Pembrokeshire and was severely damaged.
Hesleden	United Kingdom	The steamship ran aground at Nicolaieff, Russia.
Prairie Gem	Sweden	The schooner was abandoned in the Baltic Sea. Her crew were rescued by the steamship Arnold (Germany). Prairie Gem was on a voyage from Sundsvall to Lübeck, Germany.
Soudan	United Kingdom	The ship ran aground in the Hooghly River. She was on a voyage from Calcutta, India to Dundee, Forfarshire. She was refloated and put back to Calcutta for repairs.

== 4 November ==
List of shipwrecks: 4 November 1890
Ship	State	Description
Golden Cloud	United States	The ship was destroyed by fire off Cape Finisterre, Spain with loss of life. Four of her crew took to a cuddy, according to a message in a bottle that washed up on Veira, Orkney Islands, United Kingdom in late December.

== 5 November ==
List of shipwrecks: 5 November 1890
Ship	State	Description
Cincora	United Kingdom	The steamship ran aground in the River Orwell. She was then run into by a tug. She was refloated and taken in to Ipswich, Suffolk.
Garlston	Sweden	The brigantine was wrecked off Whitby, Yorkshire, United Kingdom with the loss of one of her seven crew. survivors were rescued by the Staithes Lifeboat.
Principe Amadeo di Savona	Italy	The barque caught fire at Leith, Lothian, United Kingdom. The fire was extinguished.
Roman Prince	United Kingdom	The steamship was driven ashore on Vormsi, Russia. She was later refloated and put in to Kertch.
S. C. Reynolds	United States	The ship caught fire on Lake Erie.
St. George	Germany	The steamship was presumed to have foundered off Cabo Blanco, Spain.
Ville de Bordeaux	France	The steamship was driven ashore at Bayonne, Pyrénées-Atlantiques and broke her back. Her crew were rescued.
Ville de Paris	France	The steamship was driven ashore at Bayonne and broke her back. Her crew were rescued.

== 6 November ==
List of shipwrecks: 6 November 1890
Ship	State	Description
Belfast, and Sunlight	United Kingdom	The steamships collided in the River Mersey. Belfast was beached between Egremont and New Brighton, Cheshire. She was on a voyage from Dublin to Liverpool, Lancashire. She was later refloated and taken in to Liverpool. Sunlight put in to Liverpool.
Bona	United Kingdom	The steamship caught fire at Galveston, Texas, United States. She was on a voyage from Galveston to Bremen, Germany. The fire was extinguished.
Cadoxton	United Kingdom	The steamship was run into by the steamship Emily (United Kingdom) at Penarth, Glamorgan and was severely damaged.
County of Peebles	United Kingdom	The full-rigged ship was driven ashore at Dundee, Forfarshire. She was being towed from Dundee to the River Tyne. She was refloated and taken in to Dundee for repairs.
Ellen Beatrice	United Kingdom	The schooner was driven ashore and severely damaged at Workington, Cumberland. Her crew were rescued by the Workington Lifeboat and by rocket apparatus. She was on a voyage from Llanelly, Glamorgan to Workington. She was refloated on 10 November and towed in to Workington.
Glynne	United Kingdom	The ship foundered at the mouth of the River Mersey. She was on a voyage from Runcorn, Cheshire to Falmouth, Cornwall.
Java	(United Kingdom of Great Britain and Ireland) Gibraltar	The hulk was run into by the steamship Assyria (United Kingdom) at Gibraltar and was damaged.
Juno	Sweden	The steamship was driven ashore at Fleetwood, Lancashire. She was on a voyage from Gothenburg to Fleetwood. She was refloated and taken in to the Lune Deeps.
Kishon	United Kingdom	The barque parted her tow by the steam tug Australia (Flag unknown) off Trevose Head, Cornwall and was driven ashore near the Bude breakwater. Her eight crew were saved by rocket apparatus. A would-be rescuer was drowned. Kishon was on a voyage from London to Appledore, Devon.
Kronos	United Kingdom	The steamship ran aground in the River Thames at Dagenham, Essex.
Lord Mostyn	United Kingdom	The schooner was driven ashore and wrecked at Amlwch, Anglesey. Her crew were rescued. She was on a voyage from Liverpool to Amlwch.
Reynolds	Flag unknown	The steamship was driven ashore at Colchester, Ontario, Dominion of Canada and caught fire.
SMS S 57	Imperial German Navy	The torpedo boat was driven ashore near Svanike Island, Bornholm, Denmark.
San Tomasso	Italy	The barque was abandoned in the English Channel. She was on a voyage from Leith, Lothian, United Kingdom to Genoa. She was towed in to Dover, Kent, United Kingdom by the tug Dorunda (United Kingdom).
Seaward	United Kingdom	The schooner was driven ashore at Balbriggan, County Dublin. She was on a voyage from Glasgow to Balbriggan. She was refloated on 15 November and taken in to Balbriggan.
Shamrock	United Kingdom	The fishing boat foundered off Fraserburgh, Aberdeenshire with the loss of one of her six crew.
Spray	United Kingdom	The 26-ton smack was driven ashore and wrecked at Fleetwood, or driven ashore in a Force 8 gale on the east side of the Wyre channel. Her crew abandoned her on 8 November, later in the day she was 8 feet (2.4 m) deep in the sand. She was stripped of gear and ballast. She was dug out and refloated the next day but sank. An attempt to refloat on 12 November failed and further salvage attempts were abandoned. Her crew survived.
Urania	United Kingdom	The yacht was driven ashore at Bangor, County Down with the loss of one of the eight people on board. Survivors were rescued by the Coastguard using rocket apparatus. She was on a voyage from the Clyde to Southampton, Hampshire.
W. Brugmann & Sohn No. 1	Flag unknown	The derelict ship was towed in to Slite, Sweden in a severely leaky condition.
Wonder	United Kingdom	The smack sank at Workington. Her crew were rescued.
Unnamed	United Kingdom	The ship was driven ashore at Ilfracombe, Devon.
Unnamed	Italy	The brig was driven ashore at Penarth. She was refloated with the assistance of three tugs.

== 7 November ==
List of shipwrecks: 7 November 1890
Ship	State	Description
Alexandrina	United Kingdom	The schooner was wrecked at Red Wharf Bay, Anglesey. She was on a voyage from Runcorn, Cheshire to "Marples".
Alice Latham	United Kingdom	The schooner went ashore in Moelfre Bay, Anglesey. She was on a voyage from the River Mersey to Dublin. She was later refloated.
Ann	United Kingdom	The ketch was driven ashore at Burnham-on-Sea, Somerset. Her crew survived. She was later refloated.
Ann	United Kingdom	The ship collided with Elis Sayer (United Kingdom) in the River Avon and was beached. Ann was on a voyage from Cardiff, Glamorgan to Bristol, Gloucestershire. She was refloated and found to be slightly leaky.
Argo	United Kingdom	The trow was driven ashore and sank at Burnham-on-Sea. Her crew survived. She was on a voyage from Dunball, Somerset to Lydney, Gloucestershire. She was later refloated.
Bargendin	United Kingdom	The schooner was driven ashore in the Hilbre Islands, Cheshire. She was refloated the next day and taken in to Mostyn, Flintshire.
Blanche	United Kingdom	The schooner ran aground and was wrecked near the East Hoyle Bank, in Liverpool Bay. She was later reported as obstructing navigation in Hilbre Swash. Lost with all four hands.
Bridgit Annie	United Kingdom	The schooner went missing after leaving Mostyn Roads on 6 November and was sighted off the Isle of Man, probably sank on 7 November. One of her boats was found in North Wales. Lost with all four hands. She was on a voyage from Connah's Quay, Flintshire to Belfast, County Antrim.
Brothers	United Kingdom	The fishing boat departed from Great Yarmouth, Norfolk. No further trace, presumed foundered with the loss of all eight hands.
Colonel Campbell	United Kingdom	The smack was driven ashore at Rhyl, Denbighshire. Her three crew were rescued by the Coastguard. She was on a voyage from Liverpool, Lancashire to Rhyl.
Copious	United Kingdom	The schooner was driven ashore at Burnham-on-Sea. Her crew survived. She was later refloated.
Ebenezer	United Kingdom	The schooner was lost off Lytham St. Annes, Lancashire. Her four crew were rescued by the Lytham Lifeboat Dan Proctor ( Royal National Lifeboat Institution). She was on a voyage from Runcorn to Londonderry.
Eden Harrison	United Kingdom	The schooner ran aground on the West Hoyle Bank, in Liverpool Bay with the loss of a crew member.
Elgin	United Kingdom	The barque ran aground and was wrecked on the West Hoyle Bank with the loss of two of her six crew. Survivors were rescued by the Point of Ayr Lifeboat. She was on a voyage from Dublin to Liverpool.
Elizabeth Latham	United Kingdom	The schooner went ashore in Moelfre Bay. A crew member was killed. She was later refloated.
Elizabeth Roy	United Kingdom	The barquentine was wrecked on Tory Island, County Donegal with the loss of all six crew. She was on a voyage from Galway to Ardrossan, Ayrshire.
Ellen Harrison	United Kingdom	The schooner went ashore in Moelfre Bay. A crew member was killed. Two of her crew were rescued by the Point of Ayr Lifeboat. She was refloated on 10 November. Subsequently repaired and returned to service.
Ethel May	United Kingdom	The schooner went ashore between Prestatyn and Rhyl. She was refloated and taken in to Mostyn. She was on a voyage from Connah's Quay to Belfast.
Ernest	United Kingdom	The schooner went missing after leaving the River Dee on 6 November, the last reported sighting of her was off the Great Orme, Carnarvonshire. One of her boats was recovered near the West Hoyle Bank. Lost with all three crew.
Flora Ross	United Kingdom	The brigantine was driven ashore and wrecked on Lindisfarne, Northumberland. Her five crew were rescued by the Lindisfarne Lifeboats Bombay and Grace Darling (both Royal National Lifeboat Institution). Flora Ross was on a voyage from London to Leith, Lothian.
Florence Emily	United Kingdom	The schooner went missing after leaving Mostyn Roads on 6 November. Lost with all four crew.
Galgorm Castle	United Kingdom	The steamship was driven ashore at Norbreck, Lancashire. Her crew survived.
Golden Light	United Kingdom	The schooner was lost. Her five crew were rescued by the Port Isaac Lifeboat.
Helios	Norway	The brigantine was wrecked on the Doom Bar, off Padstow, Cornwall, United Kingdom. Her seven crew were rescued by the Padstow Lifeboat. She was on a voyage from Fredrikstad to Bridgwater, Somerset, United Kingdom.
Hilda	United Kingdom	The schooner ran aground at the mouth of the River Mersey. Her four crew were rescued by the New Brighton Lifeboat. She subsequently floated off and came ashore at Crosby, Lancashire, where she was wrecked.
Independence	United Kingdom	The trow sank at Dunball.
Independent	United Kingdom	The ship sank in the River Avon at Bristol. She was refloated on 10 November and taken in to Bristol.
James Stonard	United Kingdom	The brigantine ran aground and was wrecked on the West Hoyle Bank. Her skipper and two crewmen were killed. She was on a voyage from Garston, Lancashire to Donaghadee, County Down.
Jean Campbell	United Kingdom	The schooner stranded at Norbreck, Lancashire in a Force 8 gale. Before going ashore an attempt was made to rescue the crew by the fishing smack Osprey (United Kingdom). Her boat took off the three-man crew but swamped alongside Osprey drowning Jean Campbell's crew and two of the three crew of Osprey that manned the boat. The wreck was sold for scrapping.
John Clark	United Kingdom	The schooner was lost. Her five crew were rescued by the lifeboat Bull Bay ( Royal National Lifeboat Institution).
Labora	Norway	The barque was driven ashore and sank at Fleetwood, Lancashire. Her thirteen crew were rescued by the Fleetwood Lifeboat Child of Hale ( Royal National Lifeboat Institution). Labora was on a voyage from Jamaica to Fleetwood.
Linnet	United Kingdom	The schooner was lost on Lavan Sands, Carnarvonshire.
Lorn	United Kingdom	The schooner went ashore a little to the north of Jurby Point, Isle of Man, a total wreck.
Madcap	United Kingdom	The yacht sank in the Hilbre Islands.
Margaret	United Kingdom	The schooner parted her cables in Moelfre Bay and drove before the wind into the River Dee on 6 November. She was brought to, under her kedge anchor, near to Llanerchymor Wharf, on the opposite side of the channel. About noon on 7 November when the storm was raging furiously, she sank. Her crew were rescued from her rigging by a boat.
Margaret Elizabeth	United Kingdom	The schooner was driven ashore near Rhyl. She was on a voyage from Liverpool to Rhyl.
Morfa	United Kingdom	The smack was driven ashore at Burnham-on-Sea. Her crew survived. She was later refloated.
New Brunswick	Norway	The barque was driven ashore near Fleetwood. Her eleven crew were rescued by the Fleetwood Lifeboat. She was on a voyage from Dalhousie, New Brunswick, Dominion of Canada to Glasson Dock, Lancashire. She was refloated the next day with the assistance of two tugs and towed in to Glasson Dock, where she ran aground.
Nordcap	United Kingdom	The yacht sank in the Hilbre Islands.
Ocean Queen	United Kingdom	The schooner was lost at Colwyn Bay, Denbighshire. Her four crew were rescued. She was on a voyage from Runcorn, Cheshire to Pastow, Cornwall.
Orion	United Kingdom	The barquentine was driven ashore at Ballaquine, 4 nautical miles (7.4 km) north of Peel, Isle of Man. Her nine crew were rescued by rocket apparatus. She was on a voyage from Greenwich, London to Demerara, British Guiana.
Oscar	Norway	The brig was driven ashore and severely damaged at St. Ives, Cornwall. She was later refloated and towed in to St. Ives.
Oscilia	United Kingdom	The schooner was driven ashore near the mouth of the River Alt, Lancashire. Her crew were rescued. She was on a voyage from Runcorn to Padstow.
Planet	United Kingdom	The barquentine ran aground and was wrecked in Llandudno Bay. Her six crew were rescued by the Llandudno Lifeboat Sunlight No. 1 ( Royal National Lifeboat Institution). Planet was on a voyage from Liverpool to Plymouth, Devon. A man was killed in launching the lifeboat.
Princess Louise	United Kingdom	The ketch was driven ashore and wrecked at Angle, Pembrokeshire.
Princess Sophie	Greece	The steamship was driven ashore near El Ferrol, Spain. She was on a voyage from Cardiff to El Ferrol. She was refloated and found to be severely leaky.
Robin Hood	United Kingdom	The trow was driven ashore and sank at Burnham-on-Sea. Her crew survived. She was on a voyage from Bristol, Gloucestershire to Barry, Glamorgan. She was later refloated.
Roldal	United Kingdom	The steamship ran aground on the Scroby Sands, in the North Sea off the coast of Norfolk, United Kingdom. Her twelve crew were rescued by the Gorleston Lifeboat Mark Lane ( Royal National Lifeboat Institution). Roldal was on a voyage from Grangemouth, Stirlingshire, United Kingdom to Gravelines, Nord, France. She floated off, but consequently sank.
Sabrina	United Kingdom	The schooner was driven ashore and wrecked in the River Shannon.
Salrimmer	Norway	The barque was driven ashore at Cardiff. She was refloated with the assistance of two tugs and taken in to Cardiff.
Taranaca	Brazil	The steamship was driven ashore at Rothesay, Isle of Bute, United Kingdom. She was on a voyage from the Clyde to Pará. She was refloated with assistance, and taken to Port Glasgow, Renfrewshire for repairs.
The Little Willie	United Kingdom	The fishing boat was driven into the pier and severely damaged at Southport, Lancashire.
Thomas	United Kingdom	The ketch was driven ashore and sank at Burnham-on-Sea. Her crew survived. She was later refloated.
Thorney	United Kingdom	The ship was driven ashore at Burnham-on-Sea. She was later refloated.
Undaunted	United Kingdom	The schooner sank in Conway Bay. Her five crew were rescued by the Penmon Lifeboat. She was refloated on 10 November. She was refloated on 11 November and taken in to Bangor, Caernarfonshire, where she was condemned.
Vacuna	United Kingdom	The ketch ran aground and sank in the Humber. Her crew were rescued by the Spurn Lifeboat.
Va Done	France	The brig was driven ashore at Cardiff. She was refloated.
Viceroy	United Kingdom	The dandy was driven ashore at Burnham-on-Sea. Her crew survived. She was later refloated.
Vine	United Kingdom	The schooner foundered in the Bristol Channel with the loss of all six crew.
William and Mary	United Kingdom	The schooner was wrecked at the Giant's Causeway, County Antrim with the loss of all hands.
William Bibby	United Kingdom	The dredger was abandoned off the Isle of Man. Her fifteen crew were rescued by the Ramsey Lifeboat Two Sisters ( Royal National Lifeboat Institution). William Bibby was on a voyage from Newry, County Antrim to Preston, Lancashire. She was later towed in to Ramsey, Isle of Man.
W. M. J.	United Kingdom	The schooner ran aground and was wrecked on Jordan's Bank, in Liverpool Bay. Her skipper, mate and two crewman were killed.
Several unnamed vessels	United Kingdom	The smacks sank at Southport, Lancashire.
Unnamed vessels	United Kingdom	A number of fishing vessels were driven ashore at Burnham-on-Sea.
Unnamed vessels	United Kingdom	Many boats were sunk at Ryde, Isle of Wight.
Three unnamed vessels	United Kingdom	The ships were driven ashore in the Hilbre Islands. Their crews were rescued.
Unnamed	United Kingdom	The schooner was driven ashore at Formby, Lancashire.
Unnamed	United Kingdom	The Mersey flat was driven ashore at Rhyl.
Unnamed	Flag unknown	The steamship collided with the steamship Lough Fisher (United Kingdom) and sank with the loss of all hands.
Unnamed	United Kingdom	The smack was driven ashore at Aber, Caernarfonshire with the loss of one of her two crew.
Unnamed	Flag unknown	The steamship collided with the steamship Kingfisher (United Kingdom) and sank in the Bristol Channel off Milford Haven, Pembrokeshire with the loss of all hands.
Six unnamed vessels	United Kingdom	The fishing boats, belonging to Parkgate, Cheshire, sank.

== 8 November ==
List of shipwrecks: 8 November 1890
Ship	State	Description
Elsie	Germany	The barque was abandoned off the Longships Lighthouse. Her crew were rescued by the tug St. Donats (United Kingdom). Elsie was on a voyage from Barry, Glamorgan, United Kingdom to Buenos Aires, Argentina. St. Donats towed her in to Cardiff, Glamorgan.
Lina	Russia	The brig put in to Cuxhaven, Germany in a waterlogged condition. She was on a voyage from Härnösand, Sweden to Calais, France. She was condemned.
Loftus Perkins	United Kingdom	The passenger boat ran aground in the River Tyne at Milldam. She was on a voyage from Newcastle upon Tyne, Northumberland to South Shields, County Durham.
Lorn	United Kingdom	The ship was driven ashore at Jurby Point, Isle of Man. Her crew were rescued.
Marie	United Kingdom	The barque was driven ashore and wrecked at Newton-by-the-Sea, Northumberland. Her crew were rescued. She was on a voyage from London to Burntisland, Fife.
Moray	United Kingdom	The steamship caught fire at Brunswick, Georgia, United States. The fire was extinguished.
Peyton	United Kingdom	The ship ran aground on the West Hoyle Bank, in Liverpool Bay. She was refloated with the assistance of the Rhyl Lifeboat and escorted into the River Dee.
Una	United Kingdom	The steamship was driven ashore at Zoutelande, Zeeland, Netherlands. She was on a voyage from Helsinki, Grand Duchy of Finland to Antwerp, Belgium.

== 9 November ==
List of shipwrecks: 9 November 1890
Ship	State	Description
Esther	United Kingdom	The steamship ran aground and was wrecked at the mouth of the Canche, Pas-de-Calais, France.
Foochow, and Wenchow	China; United Kingdom	The steamships collided in the Yangtze and were both severely damaged.
G. L. Waters	United Kingdom	The brigantine was driven ashore near Inaclet Point, Isle of Lewis. She was refloated.
Marie	Norway	The barque was driven ashore and sank at Seahouses, Northumberland, United Kingdom. Her crew were rescued.
Presidente de Pará	Brazil	The steamship sank in the Jurna River.
Reynolds	United States	The steamship arrived at Toledo, Ohio on fire. The fire was extinguished.
West	United Kingdom	The steamship was driven ashore and wrecked at Gravelines, Nord, France.

== 10 November ==
List of shipwrecks: 10 November 1890
Ship	State	Description
Bruno	United States	The steam barge was wrecked on the Magnetic Reef, in Lake Superior.
Chasseur	France	The barque was driven ashore at Osby, Öland, Sweden. She was on a voyage from Gävle, Sweden to Cardiff, Glamorgan, United Kingdom.
Faraday	United Kingdom	The steamship was driven ashore at Cuxhaven, Germany. She was refloated with assistance and resumed her voyage.
Ganymedes	Norway	The ship was driven ashore and severely damaged. She was refloated and towed in to Newport, Monmouthshire, United Kingdom.
Julia III	Portugal	The schooner was driven ashore at Figueira da Foz, She was on a voyage from the Newfoundland Colony to Figueira da Foz.
Kurir, and Rex	Sweden; Norway	The steamship Kurir and the barque Rex collided. Kurir sank with the loss of seven of her crew. She was on a voyage from Idefjord to Königsberg, Germany. Rex was severely damaged. She was on a voyage from Sundsvall to Dunkerque, Nord, France. She put in to Helsingør, Denmark in a waterlogged condition.
Louisa	United States	The schooner was wrecked on the Magnetic Reef.
Nugget	United Kingdom	The schooner was driven ashore at Bootle, Lancashire. She was on a voyage from Liverpool, Lancashire to "Drumore".
Ossian	United States	The steamship struck a snag and sank at Oshkosh, Wisconsin.
HMS Serpent	Royal Navy	HMS Serpent The Archer-class torpedo cruiser ran aground off Cape Vilan, Spain in a violent storm, killing 173 of the 176 aboard. She was on a voyage from Plymouth Sound to Accra, Gold Coast.
Wexford	United Kingdom	The steamship ran aground off the mouth of the River Duddon. She was on a voyage from Poti, Russia to Fleetwood, Lancashire. She was refloated.

== 11 November ==
List of shipwrecks: 11 November 1890
Ship	State	Description
Buenaventura	Spain	The steamship caught fire at New Orleans, Louisiana, United States. She was on a voyage from New Orleans to Liverpool, Lancashire, .United Kingdom
Commandant Franchetti, and Kerchalon	France	The steamship Commandant Franchetti and the barque Kerchallon collided at Pauillac, Gironde. Both vessels were severely damaged. Commandant Franchetti was on a voyage from Pauillac to Antwerp, Belgium.
Erwin Rickmers	Germany	The barque was driven ashore at Dungeness, Kent, United Kingdom. She was on a voyage from Bremerhaven to Cardiff, Glamorgan, United Kingdom. She was refloated with the assistance of the tug Lady Vita (United Kingdom) and taken in to Dover, Kent.
Euxinius	Norway	The barqueb ran aground at Veracruz, Mexico.
Margaret	United Kingdom	The ship was driven ashore at Ramsey, Isle of Man. Her crew were rescued by the Ramsey Lifeboat Two Sisters ( Royal National Lifeboat Institution). Margaret was on a voyage from Runcorn, Cheshire to Belfast, County Antrim.
Mite	United Kingdom	The schooner collided with the tug Oberon (United Kingdom) off Portishead, Somerset and sank. Her four crew were rescued by Oberon. Mite was on a voyage from Sharpness, Gloucestershire to Exeter, Devon.
Newark	United Kingdom	The steamship ran aground on Whitburn Steel, off the coast of County Durham. She was on a voyage from London to Sunderland, County Durham. She was refloated on 16 November and taken in to Sunderland.
Orion	United Kingdom	The steamship was driven ashore at Arbroath, Forfarshire. Her crew were rescued by the Arbroath Lifeboat William Souter ( Royal National Lifeboat Institution). Orion was on a voyage from Sunderland, County Durham to Arbroath. She was refloated on 24 November and towed in to Arbroath, where she was beached.
Shahjehan	United Kingdom	The steamship ran aground in the Hooghly River at Melancholy Point. She was refloated and taken in to Calcutta, India.
St. Patrick	United Kingdom	The fishing trawler collided with the steamship Olga (United Kingdom) and sank in the River Liffey.
Sweet Home	United Kingdom	The sloop was driven ashore at Berwick upon Tweed, Northumberland. She was on a voyage from the River Tyne to Dundee, Forfarshire. She was refloated.
W.M.J.	United Kingdom	The schooner was wrecked on Jordan's Bank, in Liverpool Bay.
Unnamed	Austria-Hungary	The ferry sank in the River Whag at Orşova with 60 lives lost and ten people reported missing. There were fifteen survivors.
Unnamed	Flag unknown	The barque ran aground on the Trinity Sand, in the Humber.

== 12 November ==
List of shipwrecks: 12 November 1890
Ship	State	Description
Herschel	United Kingdom	The steamship was driven ashore at Cuxhaven, Germany. She was on a voyage from "Yenitchesk" to Hamburg, Germany.
Kate	United Kingdom	The paddle steamer collided with another vessel and sank at the mouth of the Richmond River. She was on a voyage from Brisbane, Queensland to the Richmond River.
Messenger	United States	After the wooden steam barge caught fire in Rogers City, Michigan, she was towed out onto Lake Huron, where she sank in 194 feet (59 m) of water at (45.483333°N 83.85°W).
Terpsichore	Norway	The barque collided with the steamship Cassia (United Kingdom) and sank off the Goodwin Sands, Kent, United Kingdom. Her fifteen crew were rescued by the Deal Lifeboat. Terpsichore was on a voyage from Quebec, Dominion of Canada to Newcastle upon Tyne, Northumberland, United Kingdom.

== 13 November ==
List of shipwrecks: 13 November 1890
Ship	State	Description
Alent	Flag unknown	The steamship was wrecked on Santa Catalina Island, California, United States.
Alice	United Kingdom	The steamship struck a sunken wreck and foundered in the Bristol Channel off Milford Haven, Pembrokeshire. Her six crew were rescued by the steamship Humber. (United Kingdom). Alice was on a voyage from Portmadoc, Caernarfonshire to Cardiff, Glamorgan.
Amazonas	Germany	The steamship ran aground in the Elbe at "Falkenthal". She was on a voyage from Hamburg to a Brazilian port.
Gulf of Papua	United Kingdom	The steamship ran aground in the River Thames at Erith, Kent.
Moonstone	United Kingdom	The steamship ran aground in the Elbe at Finkenwerder. She was on a voyage from Odessa, Russia to Hamburg.

== 14 November ==
List of shipwrecks: 14 November 1890
Ship	State	Description
Christine Elizabeth	Norway	The schooner ran aground on the Longsand, in the North Sea off the coast of Essex, United Kingdom. She was on a voyage from Rotterdam, South Holland, Netherlands to the Netherlands East Indies. She was refloated with assistance from the tug Harwich (United Kingdom) and the Harwich Lifeboat Duke of Northumberland ( Royal National Lifeboat Institution) and towed in to Harwich, Essex.
Concordia	Russia	The barque was driven ashore. She was on a voyage from Windau to Leith, Lothian,United Kingdom. She was refloated and taken in to Leith in a severely damaged and leaky condition.
County of Salop	United Kingdom	The steamship ran aground in the Nieuwe Diep. She was on a voyage from Rangoon, Burma to Bremen, Germany. She was refloated, but ran aground again.
Derwentwater	United Kingdom	The steamship foundered off Cape Finisterre, Spain with the loss of two of her eighteen crew. She was on a voyage from Gibraltar to Hull, Yorkshire.
Kate Stuart	Dominion of Canada	The barque ran aground on the Seal Rock. She was on a voyage from Pictou, Nova Scotia to Summerside, Prince Edward Island.
Le Chatelier	France	The steamship sank at the mouth of the Loire. She was on a voyage from Havre de Grâce, Seine-inférieure to Saint-Nazaire, Loire-Inférieure.
Marianne	United Kingdom	The schooner foundered while carrying coal from Penarth, Glamorgan to Devoran, Cornwall. The vessel was found bottom up, 4 nautical miles (7.4 km) off Boscastle, Cornwall. Four of the five crew perished.
Mary	United Kingdom	The barque was abandoned in the Atlantic Ocean 30 nautical miles (56 km) south west of Flores Island, Azores. Her crew were rescued by Hawkesbury (United Kingdom). Mary was on a voyage from Demerara, British Guiana to Liverpool, Lancashire.
Notre Dame de la Garde	France	The ship was driven ashore at the mouth of the River Torrens, South Australia.
Nygenstein	Netherlands	The brig ran aground on the Gunfleet Sand, in the North Sea off the coast of Essex. She was on a voyage from London, United Kingdom to Delfzijl, Groningen. She was refloated and assisted in to Harwich in a leaky condition.
Paul Marie	France	The ship was driven ashore on Martinique. She was refloated with the assistance of a tug.
Starry Banner	United States	The steamship was wrecked at Saint Augustine, Florida. She was on a voyage from Baltimore, Maryland to Key West, Florida.

== 15 November ==
List of shipwrecks: 15 November 1890
Ship	State	Description
Alert	Dominion of Canada	The steamship was wrecked.
Anna Helena	United Kingdom	The schooner collided with the steamship Schmidtom (Flag unknown) and sank in the English Channel 9 nautical miles (17 km) off Selsey Bill, Sussex, United Kingdom with the loss of all seven crew. She was on a voyage from Hartlepool, County Durham to Portsmouth, Hampshire.
Charger	United Kingdom	The barque was abandoned at sea. Her crew were rescued by the steamship Llandaff City (United Kingdom). She was on a voyage from Dalhousie, New Brunswick, Dominion of Canada to Belfast, County Antrim. She was driven ashore and wrecked in Tralee Bay on 26 November.
Flying Bat, and Manitoban	United Kingdom	The steamship Manitoban ran aground in the Clyde at Port Glasgow. She was run into by the paddle tug Flying Bat, which was damaged. Manitoban was refloated.
Prosperity	United Kingdom	The fishing smack was run into by the steam trawler Menina (United Kingdom) at Grimsby, Lincolnshire and sank. Her crew were rescued.
Scylla	Dominion of Canada	The schooner collided with the steamship Napoleon III (United Kingdom) off Cape George, Nova Scotia and was severely damaged. She was towed in to Nashua, New Hampshire, United States by a tug.
Virgo	Austria-Hungary	The barque was driven ashore at Bermuda. She was refloated.
Unnamed	India	The flat was destroyed by fire at "Damoskdeah".

== 16 November ==
List of shipwrecks: 16 November 1890
Ship	State	Description
Camel	United Kingdom	The steamship ran aground at the mouth of the River Tees. She was on a voyage from Dunkerque, Nord, France to Middlesbrough, Yorkshire. She was refloated and completed her voyage.
Elderslie	United Kingdom	The steamship ran aground in the River Thames at Northfleet, Kent. She was on a voyage from London to Adelaide, South Australia. She was refloated the next day and resumed her voyage.
Falcon	United Kingdom	The steamship foundered 250 nautical miles (460 km) from Queenstown, County Cork (51°12′N 23°57′W) whilst enroute to New York, United States. Her crew were rescued by Pennsylvania (United States) and landed at Philadelphia, Pennsylvania, United States.
Glannibanto	United Kingdom	The steamship ran aground in the River Thames near Gravesend, Kent. She was on a voyage from Goole, Yorkshire to London. She was refloated with assistance and completed her voyage.
Goldfinder	United Kingdom	The schooner struck the Bishop's Rock and was damaged. She was on a voyage from Dundalk, County Louth to Bristol, Gloucestershire. She put in to Milford Haven, Pembrokeshire in a leaky condition.
Gulf of Akaba	United Kingdom	The steamship was driven ashore at Corral, Chile. She was later refloated.
SS Petriana (1879)	United Kingdom	The steamship caught fire at Fiume, Austria-Hungary. The fire was extinguished.
Petrolea	United Kingdom	The steamship ran aground in the Sea of Marmara at "Ingibournou", Ottoman Empire. She was refloated and resumed her voyage.

== 17 November ==
List of shipwrecks: 17 November 1890
Ship	State	Description
Alliance	United Kingdom	The steamship was driven ashore at Sea Palling, Norfolk. She was refloated the next day and taken in to Great Yarmouth, Norfolk.
Carlo R.	Italy	The steamship ran aground in the Scheldt. She was on a voyage from Odessa, Russia to Antwerp, Belgium.
Forth	United Kingdom	The steamship ran aground in the River Tees near Redcar, Yorkshire. She was on a voyage from Middlesbrough, Yorkshire to Grangemouth, Stirlingshire.
Ilo	Norway	The brig was abandoned in the North Sea. Her seven crew were rescued by the schooner Philda (Norway). Ilo was on a voyage from Drøbak to Leith, Lothian, United Kingdom.
King Arthur	United Kingdom	The steamship was driven ashore at Khargu, Iran.
Wylam	United Kingdom	The steamship ran aground in the River with am. She was refloated and taken in to Boston, Lincolnshire.

== 18 November ==
List of shipwrecks: 18 November 1890
Ship	State	Description
Balder	Norway	The schooner collided with the steamship Cedar Branch (United Kingdom) and sank off the Varne Lightship ( Trinity House).
Brandon	United Kingdom	The steamship ran aground in the Maas. She was on a voyage from Harwich, Essex to Rotterdam, South Holland, Netherlands. She was refloated on 22 November and completed her voyage.
Cuxhaven	United Kingdom	The steamship, from Hamburg, was damaged when driven into the steamship Equity (United Kingdom) in the Goole Channel after her anchor lifted during a heavy swell; she was then beached to avoid sinking. Refloated the following day, she entered Goole for discharge and repairs.
Derondas	United Kingdom	The steamship ran aground on the Haisborough Sands, in the North Sea off the coast of Norfolk. She was on a voyage from Bilbao, Spain to Sunderland, County Durham. She was refloated and completed her voyage.
Pembrokeshire	United Kingdom	The steamship was driven ashore on Kow Kow Island, Hong Kong.
Start	Victoria	The steamship struck a snag and sank in the Darling River.
Titus	Victoria	The steamship ran aground at Newcastle, New South Wales.

== 19 November ==
List of shipwrecks: 19 November 1890
Ship	State	Description
Stanwick	United Kingdom	The steamship was driven ashore. She was refloated and taken in to Saint-Nazaire, Loire-Inférieure, France in a leaky condition.

== 20 November ==
List of shipwrecks: 20 November 1890
Ship	State	Description
Canadian	United Kingdom	The brig was wrecked on the Booby Rocks, in the Bahamas. Her crew were rescued.
Cartagena	United Kingdom	The steamship ran aground on the Cross Sand, in the North Sea off the coast of Norfolk. She was refloated with the assistance of a number of tugs.
Claudine	United Kingdom	The barque was abandoned in the Atlantic Ocean (49°40′N 28°40′W). Her fourteen crew were rescued by the steamship Standard (Germany). Claudine was on a voyage from a port in New Brunswick, Dominion of Canada to Larne, County Antrim.
Etta	United Kingdom	The steamship ran aground on the Haisborough Sands, in the North Sea off the coast of Norfolk. She was refloated with the assistance of a number of tugs and towed to Great Yarmouth, Norfolk.
Golden Grove	United Kingdom	The steamship ran aground in the Dardanelles. She was refloated the next day and taken in to Constantinople, Ottoman Empire.
Hudiksvall	Sweden	The barque was under tow when the line parted and she foundered on Carmel Point, Anglesey United Kingdom. Her sixteen crew were rescued by the Holyhead Lifeboat Joseph Whitworth ( Royal National Lifeboat Institution), but the vessel was lost.
Prinses Sophie	Netherlands	The steamship ran aground at Sourabaya, Netherland East Indies. She was on a voyage from Tjilatjap to Sourabaya. She was refloated.
Thordisa	United Kingdom	The steamship was driven ashore on Lundy Island, Devon. She was refloated and put back to Cardiff, Glamorgan.

== 21 November ==
List of shipwrecks: 21 November 1890
Ship	State	Description
Capella	Germany	The steamship ran aground in the River Thames at Charlton, London, United Kingdom.
Dahlman	United States	The barge caught fire at New York.
Emilie	Germany	The barque was driven ashore and wrecked at Gothenburg, Sweden. Her crew were rescued. She was on a voyage from West Hartlepool, County Durham, United Kingdom to Swinemünde.
Emily and Harriet	United Kingdom	The Thames barge was run into by the steamship Zweena (United Kingdom) and sank in the River Thames off the Tower of London.
Laurier	France	The fishing smack collided with a British ship and sank in the North Sea off Whitby, Yorkshire, United Kingdom with the loss of one of her four crew.
Merlin	United Kingdom	The steamship was run into by the steamship Roumania (United Kingdom) in the Clyde and was beached. She was refloated on 24 November and placed under repair.
Nordlyset	Norway	The ship ran aground. She was on a voyage from Sundsvall, Sweden to Dieppe, Seine-Inférieure, France. She was refloated and put in to Arendal.
Nurjahan	United Kingdom	The cargo ship was wrecked 14 nautical miles (26 km) east north east of Cape Comorin, India. She was on a voyage from Bombay to Calcutta.
Persian	Germany	The schooner ran aground and was wrecked at Heligoland. Her crew were rescued. She was on a voyage from Warkworth, Northumberland, United Kingdom to Heligoland.
Rose Mysterieuse	France	The ketch was run down and sunk off the Isle of Wight, United Kingdom by the steamship Larpool (United Kingdom) with the loss of one of her three crew. Rose Mysterieuse was on a voyage from Dunkerque, Nord to Saint-Malo, Ille-et-Vilaine.
T. E. Forster	United Kingdom	The steamship collided with the steamship Indian Prine (United Kingdom) and sank in the River Thames at Tilbury Fort, Essex. She was refloated on 1 December and beached.
Vidar	Norway	The steamship ran aground at Lisbon, Portugal. She was on a voyage from Lisbon to Rouen, Seine-Inférieure. She was refloated and put back to Lisbob.

== 22 November ==
List of shipwrecks: 22 November 1890
Ship	State	Description
Benalder	United Kingdom	The steamship ran aground at Stevns, Denmark. She was on a voyage from Danzig, Germany to Greenock, Renfrewshire. She was refloated with assistance and towed in to Copenhagen, Denmark.
Cadet	Germany	The ship collided with a British steamship in the Stöhr and was severely damaged.
Canton	United Kingdom	The steamship ran aground at Hong Kong.
Chilli	France	The steamship ran aground in the Loire at Pauillac, Loire-Inférieure. She was on a voyage from Pauillac to Valparaíso, Chile. She was refloated.
Hawk	United Kingdom	The ship caught fire at London. The fire was extinguished.
J. P. Berg	Norway	The barque was run into by the steamship Saint Asaph (United Kingdom) at Savannah, Georgia, United States and was severely damaged.
Regina	Denmark	The schooner collided with the steamship Primate (United Kingdom) and sank off Copenhagen with the loss of five lives. Regina was on a voyage from Charlestown, Cornwall to Stettin, Germany.

== 23 November ==
List of shipwrecks: 23 November 1890
Ship	State	Description
Alexander III	Denmark	The steamship was driven ashore on Psathoura, Greece. She was on a voyage from Salonica, Greece to Smyrna, Russia. She was refloated on 7 December and towed in to Peristera, Greece.
Alhambra	Norway	The barque was wrecked at Salinas, Brazil. Her crew were rescued. She was on a voyage from Cardiff, Glamorgan, United Kingdom to Pará, Brazil.
Antilla	Dominion of Canada	The ship was driven ashore at Barry, Glamorgan. She was refloated on 25 November and taken in to Penarth, Glamorgan.
Brunel	United Kingdom	The steamship caught fire at Savannah, Georgia, United States. The fire was extinguished.
Eden	United Kingdom	The steamship collided with the steamship Para or Pyrrha (United Kingdom) off Barry, Glamorgan and was severely damaged. She put in to Barry. Subsequently taken in to Penarth, Glamorgan for repairs.
Francis	United Kingdom	The schooner collided with the steamship Siestio (Spain) 15 nautical miles (28 km) off Flamborough Head, Yorkshire. She was subsequently towed in to Hull, Yorkshire by a steam trawler in a severely damaged condition.
Idog	Denmark	The schooner was driven ashore and damaged at Ljusne, Sweden.
Maria Luigia	United Kingdom	The schooner ran aground off Worthing, Sussex. She was on a voyage from Newcastle upon Tyne, Northumberland to Paignton, Devon. She was refloated and resumed her voyage.
Palander	United Kingdom	The barque ran aground on the Varne Sands, in the English Channel off the coast of Kent. She was on a voyage from Sunderland, County Durham to Buenos Aires, Argentina. She was refloated and taken in to The Downs in a leaky condition.
Uppingham	United Kingdom	The cargo ship lost power, drifted onto rocks 4 nautical miles (7.4 km) west of Hartland Point, Devon and became a wreck; eight of her 28 crew were lost. Eight of the survivors were rescued by rocket apparatus, the rest took to the boats. She was on a voyage from Cardiff to Port Said, Egypt with coal.

== 24 November ==
List of shipwrecks: 24 November 1890
Ship	State	Description
Alarm	United Kingdom	The collier, a schooner, was driven ashore and sank at Sandgate, Kent. Her crew survived. She was on a votage from Guernsey, Channel Islands to Folkestone, Kent.
Bay Wreath	United Kingdom	The smack collided with the fishing trawler Resolution and sank in the North Sea with the loss of a crew member.
Calypso	United Kingdom	The steamship collided with the steamship Pinzon (Spain) in the Dungeness roadstead, Kent and sank 1.5 nautical miles (2.8 km) off Sandgate, Kent. Her sixteen crew took to the ships' boats. Fourteen were subsequently rescued by the Lydd Lifeboat Meyer de Rothschild ( Royal National Lifeboat Institution) and the other two by the schooner Devonian (United Kingdom). Calypso was on a voyage from Antwerp, Belgium to Gloucester.
Eyr	United Kingdom	The ship was wrecked in the Seven Hogs, County Kerry.
Helena	Norway	The ship capsized off Hirtshals, Denmark. Her crew were rescued. She was on a voyage from Christiansund to Aalborg, Denmark.
Laura and Isabel	United Kingdom	The barquentine ran aground on the Goodwin Sands, Kent. She was on a voyage from Hartlepool, County Durham to Portsmouth, Hampshire. She was refloated with assistance the next day and taken in to Ramsgate, Kent in a severely leaky condition.
Mary	Norway	The barque was wrecked at Tilt Cove, Newfoundland Colony. Her crew were rescued.
Mongalore, and Sudbourn	United Kingdom	The ships collided off Dungeness. The full-rigged ship Sudbourn sank with the loss of eleven of her 24 crew. Survivors were rescued by Mongalore, which was on a voyage from sunderland, County Durham to Valparaíso, Chile. She was taken in tow for London. Sudbourn was on a voyage from Hamburg, Germany to Rangoon, Burma.
Moss Brow	United Kingdom	The steamship was driven ashore near Gothenburg, Sweden. She was on a voyage from Nyhamn, Sweden to London. She was refloated on 6 December and taken in to Gothenburg.
Rio del Oro	Sweden	The ship collided with the steamship Vesuv (Denmark). Rio del Oro was on a voyage from Stockholm, Sweden to Rosario, Brazil. She put in to Helsingør, Denmark in a waterlogged condition.
Sapphire	United Kingdom	The steamship was driven ashore 10 nautical miles (19 km) from Domesnes, Courland Governorate. Her crew were rescued. She was later salvaged.
Vivienne	United Kingdom	The steamship ran aground in the River Tweed. She was on a voyage from Huelva, Spain to Berwick upon Tweed, Northumberland. She was refloated and taken in to Berwick upon Tweed.
Westbourne	United Kingdom	The steamship foundered in the Black Sea with the loss of eighteen of her 23 crew. She was on a voyage from Theodosia, Russia to Dunkerque, Nord, France.
Willie	United Kingdom	The brigantine was run into in Hollesley Bay by the brigantine Brocklesby (United Kingdom) and was severely damaged. She put in to Whitstable, Kent.
Zincora	United Kingdom	The steamship ran aground in the Isles of Scilly. She was on a voyage from Newport, Monmouthshire to Oran, Algeria. She was refloated and put in to Cardiff, Glamorgan.

== 25 November ==
List of shipwrecks: 25 November 1890
Ship	State	Description
Betty'	Sweden	The brig foundered in the North Sea. She was on a voyage from Newcastle upon Tyne, Northumberland, United Kingdom to Helsingborg.
Countess	United Kingdom	The steamship was driven ashore near Odessa, Russia. She was refloated on 29 November and taken in to Odessa.
Elizabeth Crooks	United Kingdom	The schooner collided with Drydens (United Kingdom at Kingstown, County Dublin and was severely damaged.
Emma A.	Italy	The barque ran aground at Buenos Aires, Argentina.
Encarnacion	Spain	The hulk was destroyed by fire at Cádiz.
Girrique	France	The steamship collided with the steamship Oranje Nassau (Netherlands) at Havre de Grâce, Seine-Inférieure and was severely damaged.
Lilian	United Kingdom	The brig was driven ashore at Lista, Norway. She was on a voyage from Leith, Lothian to Christiansand, Norway.
Nancy Wignall	United Kingdom	The schooner was driven ashore at "Cardon", Isle of Arran. She was on a voyage from Glasgow, Renfrewshire to Dingle, County Kerry. She was refloated with the assistance of the tug Dauntless (United Kingdom).
Naomi	Sweden	The barque was driven ashore at Swinemünde, Germany. Her crew were rescued. She was on a voyage from Wolgast, Germany to Oskarshamn.
Sarah	United Kingdom	The brig ran aground off Worthing, Sussex. She was refloated with assistance and taken in to Littlehampton, Sussex.
Spy	United States	The sloop was crushed by ice and broken into pieces at Point Barrow on the Arctic Ocean coast of the District of Alaska. All on board survived.
Vassilissa	Greece	The ship was driven ashore 20 nautical miles (37 km) from Eupatoria, Russia.
Winkul	Russia	The schooner was driven ashore on Hjelm, Denmark. Her crew were rescued. She was on a voyage from Cronstadt to Grimsby, Lincolnshire, United Kingdom.

== 26 November ==
List of shipwrecks: 26 November 1890
Ship	State	Description
Fortuna	Flag unknown	The schooner was driven ashore near "Vraa", Denmark. Her crew were rescued.
Nightingale	United Kingdom	The ketch was driven ashore at Yarmouth, Isle of Wight. Her crew survived.
Stanhope	United Kingdom	The steamship was driven ashore at the mouth of the Daugava near Riga, Russia. Her crew were rescued by a tug. She was refloated in early December and taken in to Riga.
Thanemore	United Kingdom	The passenger-cargo ship was sighted off Cape Henry, Virginia, United States. She was on a voyage from Baltimore, Maryland, United States to Liverpool, Lancashire. No further trace, reported missing. The official inquiry concluded that Thanemore was the ship seen burning on 1 December by the steamship Lero (Flag unknown), 1,500 nautical miles (2,800 km; 1,700 mi) from the American coast.
40 unnamed vessels	Norway	The fishing vessels foundered off the coast of Norway with the loss of 28 lives.
128 unnamed vessels	Norway	The fishing vessels were severely damaged on the coast of Norway.

== 27 November ==
List of shipwrecks: 27 November 1890
Ship	State	Description
Amazone	Germany	The schooner was abandoned in the North Sea. Her crew were rescued by the steamship Tor (Sweden). Amazone was on a voyage from Sundsvall, Sweden to Sunderland, County Durham, Yorkshire, United Kingdom.
Frederick	Denmark	The barque was wrecked on Anholt. Her crew were rescued.
Hilda	Russia	The barque was driven ashore at Visby, Gotland, Sweden. She was on a voyage from Cádiz, Spain to Porvoo, Grand Duchy of Finland.
Louise	Sweden	The schooner was abandoned in the North Sea 220 nautical miles (410 km) east of Spurn Head, United Kingdom. Her crew were rescued. She was on a voyage from Hartlepool, County Durham, United Kingdom to Varberg.
Magenta	Norway	The schooner was abandonedin the North Sea. Her crew were rescued by the steam trawler Witham (United Kingdom). Magenta was on a voyage from Seaham, County Durham to Christiania.
Mary Louisa	United Kingdom	The schooner ran aground at Runcorn, Cheshire and was damaged. She was refloated.
Pollux	United Kingdom	The steamship was sighted in the Atlantic Ocean She was on a voyage from Rouen, Seine-Inférieure to Philadelphia, Pennsylvania, United States. No further trace, reported overdue.
Rare Plant	United Kingdom	The ship ran aground at Runcorn. She was refloated.
Secundus	(Russian Empire) Grand Duchy of Finland	The schooner was driven ashore near Sea Palling, Norfolk, United Kingdom. Her crew were rescued. She was on a voyage from Pori to Valencia, Spain.
Thebes	United Kingdom	The steamship caught fire at Liverpool, Lancashire. The fire was extinguished.
T. P. Leathers	United States	Seventeen lives were lost when the steamboat caught fire on the Mississippi River near Fort Adams, Mississippi. Several people drowned whilst attempting to swim to the shore.
Vandeleur	United Kingdom	The steamship was driven ashore at Killadysert, County Clare.
Unnamed	Flag unknown	The steamship was driven ashore 3 nautical miles (5.6 km) east of Folkestone, Kent, United Kingdom.

== 28 November ==
List of shipwrecks: 28 November 1890
Ship	State	Description
Active	Sweden	The sloop was wrecked near Rødvig, Denmark.
Annie	United Kingdom	The steamship struck a rock 10 nautical miles (19 km) off "Kara Bournon" and was beached near the mouth of the Kamtchik River. She was on a voyage from Constantinople, Ottoman Empire to Varna, Bulgaria. She was refloated and completed her voyage.
Astrologer	United Kingdom	The steamship caught fire at Grimsby, Lincolnshire.
Celeste	United Kingdom	The steamship capsized at Great Yarmouth, Norfolk, damaging several fishing boats. She was on a voyage from Dieppe, Seine-Inférieure, France to Newcastle upon Tyne, Northumberland.
Christine Adele	Norway	The barque was driven ashore at Nidingen, Sweden. She was on a voyage from Gävle, Sweden to Liverpool, Lancashire, United Kingdom. She was refloated with the assistance of a steamship and taken in to Gothenburg, Sweden in a leaky condition.
Dorothea	Denmark	The schooner was holed by ice and sank in the Daugava. She was on a voyage from Riga to Nakskov, Russia.
Halmstad	Sweden	The steamship capsized near "Schotzgrund", Denmark. Her crew were rescued.
Kurla	Norway	The ship was abandoned in the North Sea. Her crew were rescued by the steam trawler Jurassic (United Kingdom).
Liberal	Norway	The galiot ran aground on the Cross Sand, in the North Sea off the coast of Norfolk. She was refloted with assistance and taken in to Great Yarmouth.
Moreno	United Kingdom	The steamship caught fire at Rotterdam, South Holland, Netherlands. The fire was extinguished.
Orient	United Kingdom	The steamship ran aground at Königsberg, Germany. She was on a voyage from Königsberg to Pillau, Germany. She was refloated with the assistance of an icebreaker and completed her voyage.
Papa	Denmark	The barque was wrecked on the Whiting Sand, in the North Sea off the coast of Norfolk. One of her ten crew was reported missing.
Tremayne	United Kingdom	The steamship ran aground on the Dhor Pinal Rocks, in Novorossiysk Bay. She was refloated the next day with the assistance of a tug.
Vingolf	Norway	The barque was abandoned in the North Sea. Her crew were rescued by the barque Garant (Norway).
Waldemar	Russia	The schooner foundered off Domesnes, Norway.
Yelva	Norway	The schooner was abandoned in the North Sea. Her crew were rescued by the smack Etoile (United Kingdom).
Unnamed	United Kingdom	The barque foundered at the mouth of the River Thames. She was on a voyage from London to Queenborough, Kent.
Unnamed	United Kingdom	The fishing boat was run down and sunk at Aberdeen by the fishing trawler St. Fates (United Kingdom). Her four crew were rescued by St. Fates.

== 29 November ==
List of shipwrecks: 29 November 1890
Ship	State	Description
Charrington	United Kingdom	The steamship ran aground 4 nautical miles (7.4 km) north of the mouth of the River Tyne. She was refloated and resumed her voyage.
Francis E. Hallock'	United States	The schooner collided with another vessel and capsized off Sandy Hook, New Jersey. She was on a voyage from New York to a port in Virginia.
Helene	Germany	The ship was driven ashore on Hiddensee. She was on a voyage from Jakobstad, Grand Duchy of Finland to Grimsby, Lincolnshire, United Kingdom.
Millie Bain	United Kingdom	The barquentine ran aground at Hayle, Cornwall. She was on a voyage from the River Tyne to Hayle. She was refloated and towed in to St. Ives, Cornwall.
Unnamed	Russia	The lighter sank at Saint Petersburg.

== 30 November ==
List of shipwrecks: 30 November 1890
Ship	State	Description
Bostrene	Denmark	The schooner was driven ashore near Præstø. Her crew were rescued. She was on a voyage from "Rouneby" to Copenhagen.
Castilla	Spain	The barque was driven ashore in the Chandeleur Islands, Louisiana, United States. her crew survived.
Cormorant	Flag unknown	The steamship caught fire at Toledo, Ohio, United States and was severely damaged. She was on a voyage from Cleveland, Ohio to Toledo.
Doris	United Kingdom	The steamship ran aground on the Askhowan Reef, in the Black Sea. She was refloated on 6 December.
Dunbritton	United Kingdom	The steamship foundered in the Atlantic Ocean 110 nautical miles (200 km) off Cape Vilano, Spain. Her crew were rescued by the steamship Gledbolt (United Kingdom). Dunbritton was on a voyage from Valencia, Spain to Bristol, Gloucestershire.
Fasch	Portugal	The schooner was wrecked at Casablanca, Morocco. Her crew were rescued.
Fernas de Magalhaes	Portugal	The schooner was wrecked at Casablanca. Her crew were rescued.
Louise	Denmark	The schooner was towed in to Helsingør in a waterlogged conditiom. She was on a voyage from Narva, Russia to Grimsby, Lincolnshire, United Kingdom.
Rhodora	United Kingdom	The steamship ran aground in the Nieuwe Waterweg at Maassluis, South Holland, Netherlands. She was refloated the next day.

== Unknown date ==
List of shipwrecks: Unknown date in November 1890
Ship	State	Description
Accomac	United Kingdom	The ship was driven ashore. She was refloated on 22 November and taken in to South Shields, County Durham.
Activity	United Kingdom	The steamship was driven ashore at Honfleur, Manche, France. She was later refloated and resumed her voyage.
Albanian	United Kingdom	The steamship was driven ashore on the Swedish Coast. She was refloated on 9 November, but sank again.
Allegro	United Kingdom	The ship was driven ashore at Yarmouth, Isle of Wight before 15 November. She was on a voyage from London to Plymouth, Devon.
Bela	United Kingdom	The ship was driven ashore at Goatness Point, Lothian before 10 November. She subsequently broke up.
Calla	Sweden	The barque was abandoned in the North Sea. Her crew were rescued.
Discoverer	United Kingdom	The steamship ran aground at Cartagena, Colombia. She was refloated.
Egil	Flag unknown	The steamship ran aground. She was refloated and taken in to Copenhagen, Denmark.
El Callao	United Kingdom	The steamship ran aground at Bermuda. She was later refloated.
European	United Kingdom	The steamship caught fire at sea. She was on a voyage from New Orleans, Louisiana, United States to Bremerhaven, Germany. She put in to Key West, Florida, United States. The fire was later extinguished.
Falka	Norway	The barque foundered off Tignish, Prince Edward Island, Dominion of Canada with the loss of all hands on or about 11 November. She was on a voyage from Murray Bay, Quebec, Dominion of Canada to Bowling, Dunbartonshire, United Kingdom.
Granada	United States	The barque was abandoned in the Atlantic Ocean. Her crew were rescued. She was on a voyage from Philadelphia, Pennsylvania to Bermuda.
Gussie	United States	The steamship ran aground at Cabo Gracias a Dios, Nicaragua. She was refloated six days later and taken in to Bluefields, Nicaragua.
Hilda	United Kingdom	The barque was driven ashore. She was later refloated and taken in to "Grant".
Isca	United Kingdom	The ship was wrecked at Punta Arenas, Chile before 25 November.
Joutsen	Russia	The barque was abandoned in the Atlantic Ocean. Her crew were rescued. She was on a voyage from Philadelphia, Pennsylvania to Fernandina Beach, Florida, United States.
Johanne August	Norway	The barque was driven ashore. She was on a voyage from Sundsvall, Sweden to Hull, Yorkshire, United Kingdom. She was refloated and assisted in to Korsør, Denmark.
John Sanderson	United Kingdom	The steamship was driven ashore on the German coast. She was refloated on 14 November and taken in to Geestemünde.
Joseph John	United Kingdom	The steamship ran aground in the Scheldt. She was refloated with assistance and taken under tow, but collided with the steamship Calypso (United Kingdom) and was beached.
Karla	Norway	The barque was abandoned at sea. Her crew were rescued by the steam trawler Jurassic (United Kingdom).
Louise H.	United Kingdom	The steamship ran aground at Sandhammer, Norway. She was later refloated and taken in to Copenhagen.
Newchwang, and Wanchowtacuan	United Kingdom; China	The steamships collided at Shanghai and were both severely damaged.
Oregon	United Kingdom	The steamship ran aground on the Beaufort Shoal. She was later refloated and taken in to Quebec, Dominion of Canada.
Panathikou Akathistou'	Greece	The barque foundered off Argostoli in mid-November. She was on a voyage from Santorino to Trieste.
Pomoschtschnuik	Russia	The steamship ran aground near Cronstadt. She was on a voyage from Saint Petersburg to Windau. She was refloated and towed in to Cronstadt.
Rance	United Kingdom	The barque caught fire at Dunedin, New Zealand and was scuttled. She was later refloated.
Sarah Ann	United Kingdom	The brigantine collided with another vessel and sank in The Solent. The wreck was subsequently dispersed by explosives.
Scaramanga	Norway	The barque was abandoned in the North Sea 90 nautical miles (170 km) east half south of the Girdle Ness Lighthouse, Aberdeenshire, United Kingdom.
Sigrid	Norway	The ship collided with another vessel before 18 November and was severely damaged. She was on a voyage from a Norwegian port to New York, United States.
Sinken	Norway	The barque was abandoned and set afire in the Atlantic Ocean (47°07′N 59°19′W). Her crew were rescued by the schooner Hattie L. Newman (United States).
Thomas Hunt	United States	The whaler, a schooner, foundered off Sal, Cape Verde Islands. Her crew were rescued.
Wiltshire	United Kingdom	The steamship was driven ashore at Honfleur. She was later refloated and resumed her voyage.
Unnamed	Flag unknown	The barque capsized in the North Sea 100 nautical miles (190 km) east of Inchcape, Fife, United Kingdom on or before 11 November.
