= Psathoura =

Greek island in the Aegean Sea

Ψαθούρα

- Location within Greece

Geography
- Coordinates: 39.498°N 24.181°E
- Archipelago: Sporades
- Highest elevation: 28.9 m (94.8 ft)

Administration
- Greece
- Region: Thessaly
- Regional unit: Sporades
- Municipality: Alonnisos

Demographics
- Population: 0 (2011)

Psathoura (Greek: Ψαθούρα pronounced [psaˈθura]) is a Greek island in the Northern Sporades. It is administratively a part of Alonnisos. As of 2011, it had no resident population. The Psathoura lighthouse, built in 1895, stands at 28.9 metres. It is one of the tallest in the Aegean. Its signal is a flash of one second every ten seconds. All of Psathoura is in Zone A2 of the Alonnisos Marine Park.

== Nearest islands and islets ==
Its nearest islands and islets are Pelagos to the southwest, Gioura to the south and Piperi to the southeast.
