= Youra =

Youra may refer to:

- Youra (singer) (born 1993), a South Korean singer-songwriter
- Islet of Youra (or Gioura), a small Greek island
