= Alonnisos =

Alonnisos Αλόννησος
- Municipality
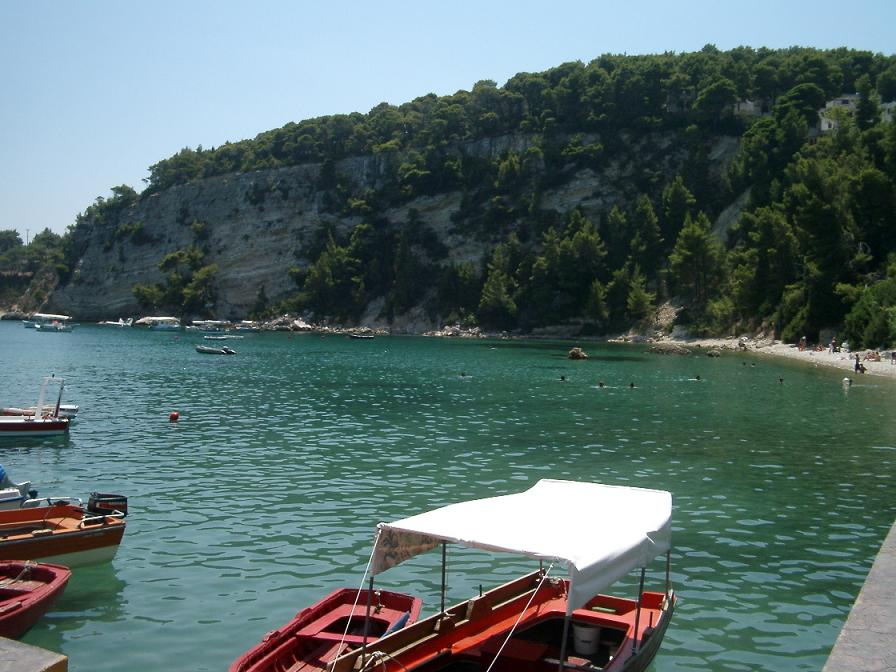
- Port of Alonnisos

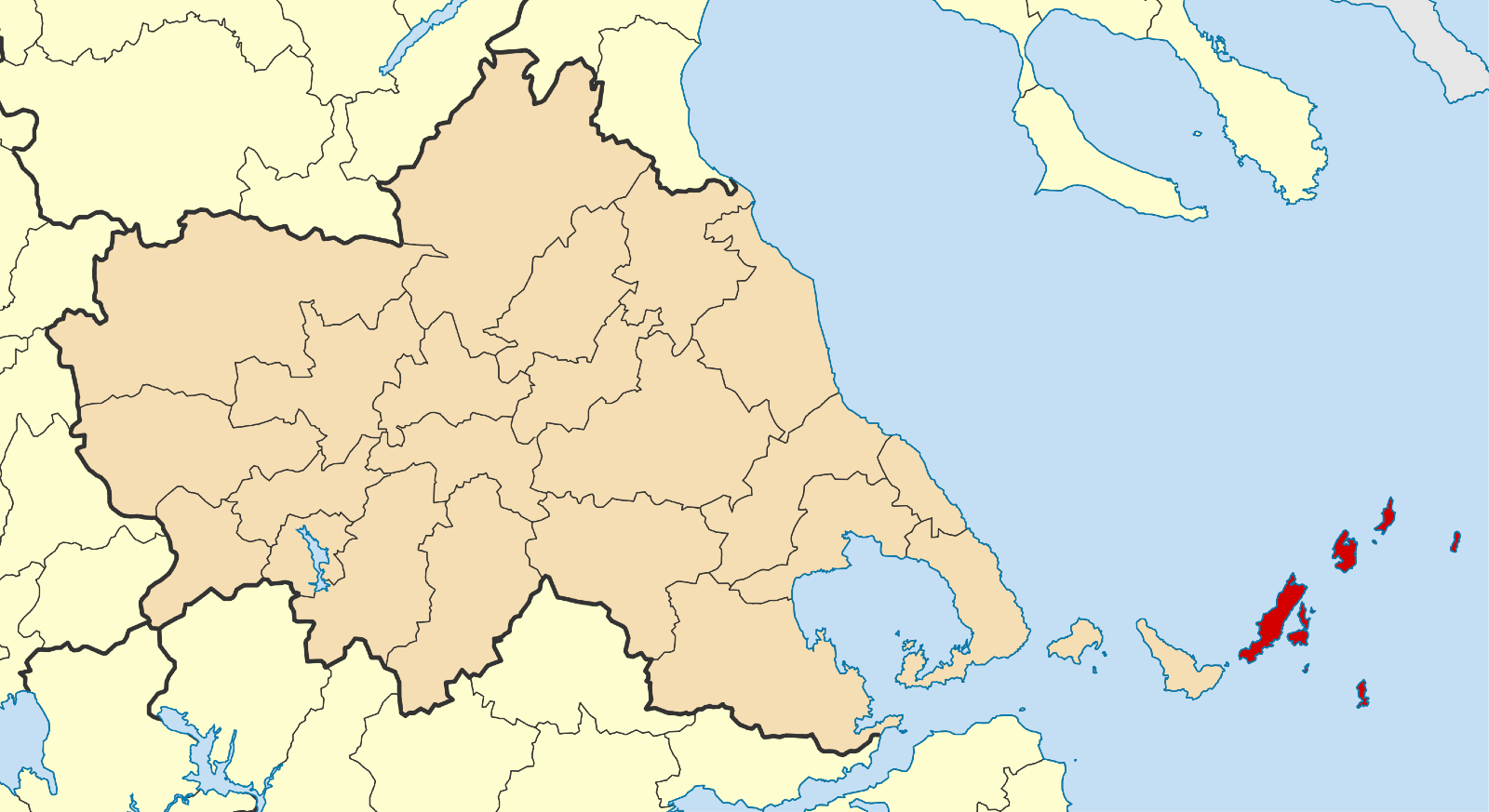

- Location within Greece
- Coordinates: 39°9′N 23°50′E
- Country: Greece
- Administrative region: Thessaly
- Regional unit: Sporades
- Seat: Patitiri

Area
  - Municipality: 129.6 km^{2} (50.0 sq mi)
- Highest elevation: 476 m (1,562 ft)
- Lowest elevation: 0 m (0 ft)

Population (2021)
  - Municipality: 3,138
  - Density: 24.21/km^{2} (62.71/sq mi)
- Time zone: UTC+2 (EET)
  - Summer (DST): UTC+3 (EEST)
- Postal code: 370 05
- Area code: 24240
- Vehicle registration: BO
- Website: www.alonissos.org

Alonnisos (Greek: Αλόννησος [aˈlonisos]), also transliterated as Alonissos, is a Greek island in the Aegean Sea. After Skiathos and Skopelos, it is the third member of the Northern Sporades. It is 3 km (2 mi) (2 nm) east of the island of Skopelos. Alonnisos is also the name of a village on the island, as well as the municipality that encompasses the island and the village.

The village of Alonnisos is located on the southern part of the island. It is locally known as Chora and signposted as The Old Village. The main port of the island is located in the southeast and is called Patitiri. There are ferry, catamaran ("flying cat"), and hydrofoil ("flying dolphin") services from Patitiri to Volos, Agios Konstantinos, and Thessaloniki on the mainland and to the islands of Skiathos, Skopelos, and Skyros. The bay at the southern end of the island is also called Alonnisos.

The Municipality of Alonnisos includes the nearby islands of Adelfoi, Gioura, Kyra Panagia (Pelagos), Peristera, Piperi, Psathoura and Skantzoura.

== History ==
In the Middle Ages and until the 19th century, the island was known as Liadromia (Λιαδρόμια). It was renamed in 1838, as it was – mistakenly, according to later research – identified with Halonnesus of Antiquity. In reality, the present island of Alonnisos was known as Icus or Ikos (Ancient Greek: Ἴκος) to the Ancient Greeks. Under that name, it is mentioned as having been colonised by Cnossians. The fleet of Attalus and the Rhodians sailed past Scyrus to Icus. Phanodemus wrote an account of the island.

== Geography ==
The island at its widest is 4.5 km (3 mi) from northwest to southeast and at its longest is 20 km (12 mi) from southwest to northeast. The area of the island is 64 km^{2} (25 sq mi). The island is mostly limestone. It is located east of mainland Greece and Magnesia, northeast of Euboea and northwest of the island of Skyros.

== The island ==
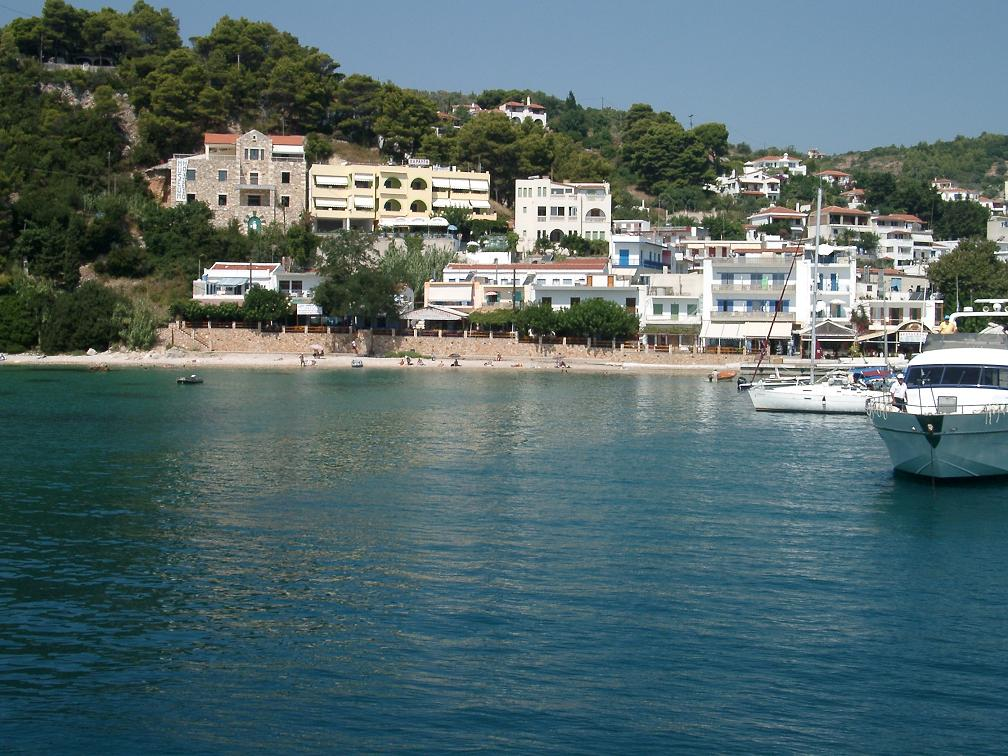
Alonnisos

Agriculture is widespread on Alonnisos, predominantly mixed farming and vineyards. The main products are almonds, grapes, figs and olives. Pine trees are abundant on the island. While fishing is a popular profession on the island, tourism is now the main industry.

Housing traditionally consists of closely constructed houses with stone walls, which, until 1965, were centered on the capital—a small fortress protected against enemies and pirates. The island and the village were heavily damaged in an earthquake on 9 March 1965. Many inhabitants returned not to the village of Alonnisos, but to Patitiri. The old village has been restored in recent years, with rebuilt houses now utilised for tourism.

The beaches around the island consist of pebbles. The ecosystem on the north side of the island is in good condition. The Mediterranean monk seal (Monachus monachus) is common around the island, and in 1992, the Alonnisos Marine Park was created to protect these seals and other animals.

In July 2021, Kostis, a monk seal that was the mascot of the island, was killed, apparently by a spearfisher.

== Communities and subdivisions ==
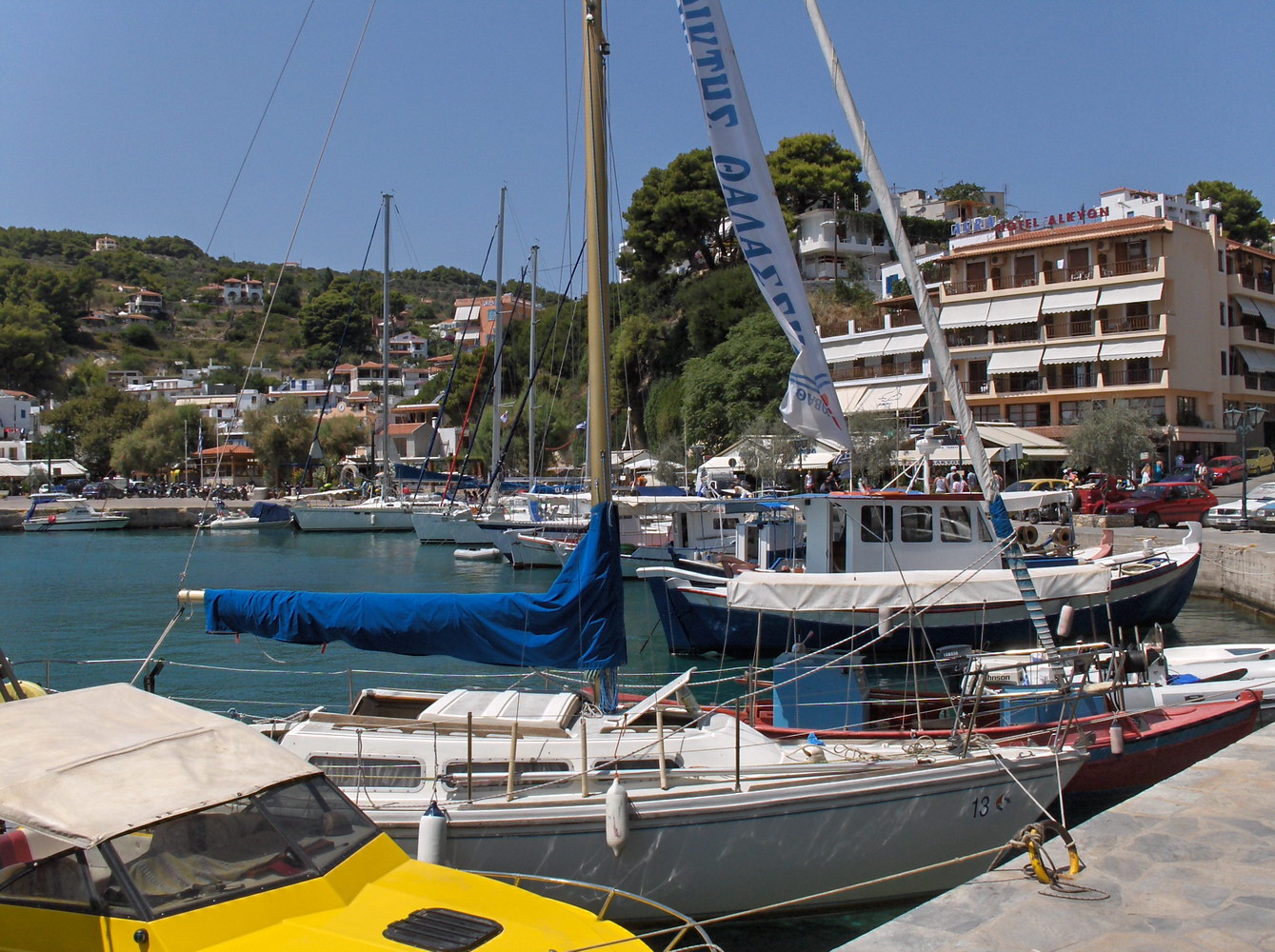
Port of Patitiri

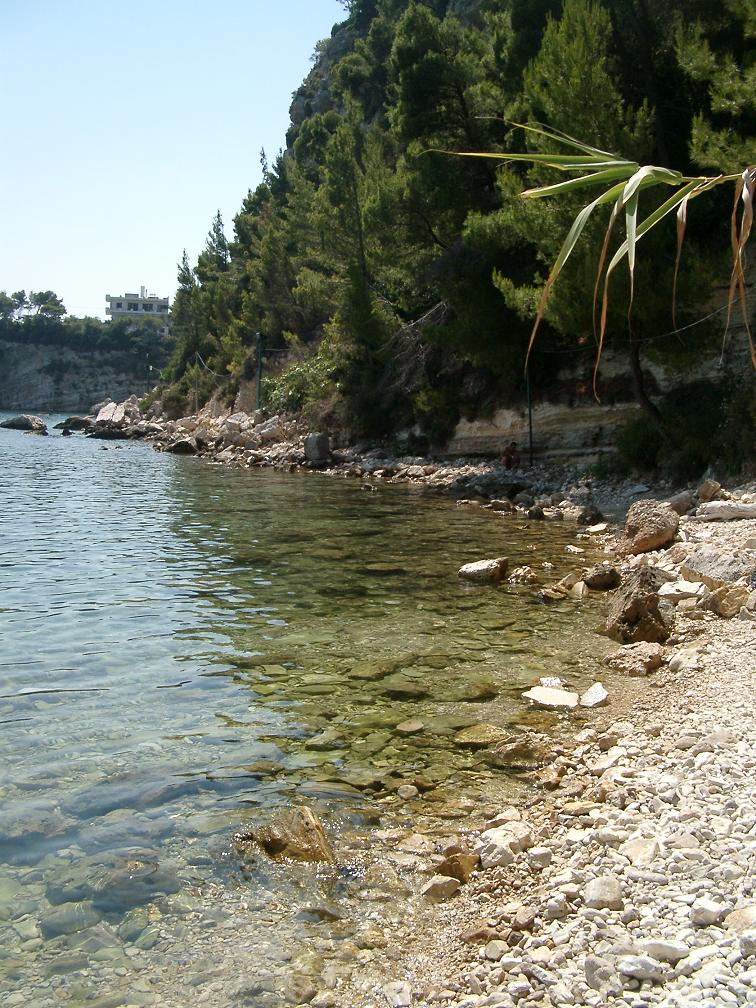
Beach in Alonnisos

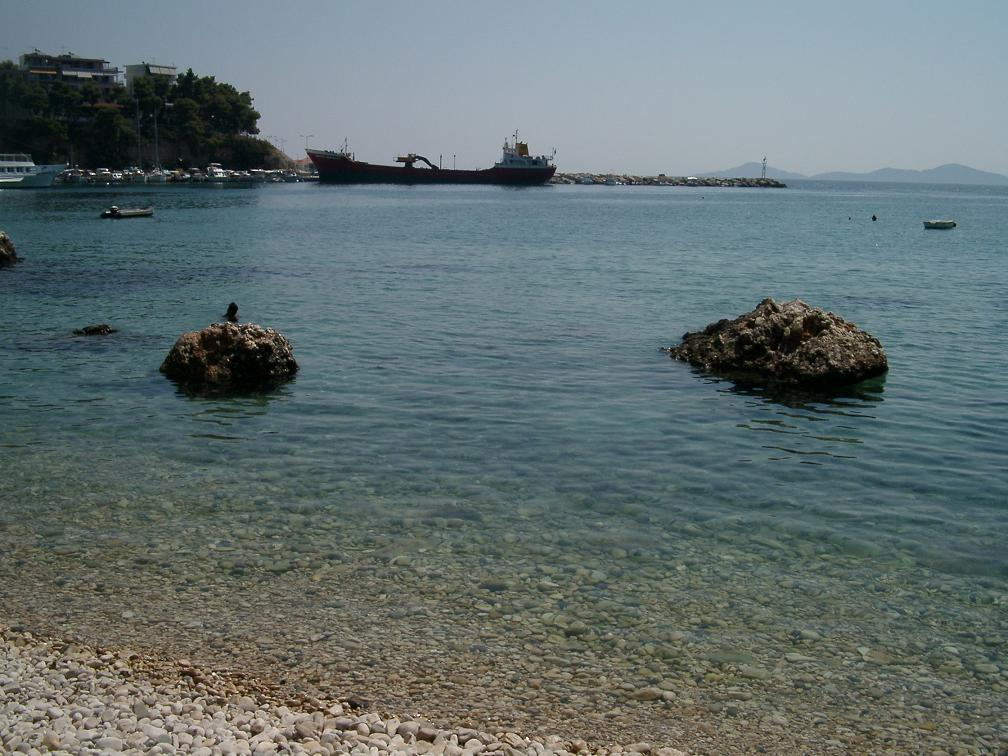
Beach in Alonnisos

The Municipality includes several other islands with small resident populations. The total land area of the municipality is 129.607 km^{2} (50.042 sq mi). The 2021 census population was 3,138 inhabitants, of whom only 33 persons lived on the other islands.

=== Alonnisos Island ===
- Ágios Pétros (Άγιος Πέτρος)
- Alónnisos (Αλόννησος)
- Chrysi Milia (Χρυσή Μηλιά)
- Gérakas (Γέρακας)
- Isiomata (Ισιώματα)
- Kalamákia (Καλαμάκια)
- Marpounta (Μαρπούντα) - abandoned
- Mourtero (Μουρτερό)
- Patitiri (Πατητήρι)
- Steni Vala (Στενή Βάλα)
- Votsi (Βότση)

=== Other islands ===
- Adelfoi (Αδελφοί)
- Gioura (Γιούρα)
- Kokkinonisi (Κοκκινονήσι)
- Kyra Panagia (Κυρά Παναγιά)
- Manolas (Μανωλάς)
- Peristera (Περιστέρα)
- Piperi (Πιπέρι)
- Psathoura (Ψαθούρα)
- Skantzoura (Σκάντζουρα)

== Historical population ==
Year	Population
1991	2,985
2001	2,700
2011	2,750
2021	3,138
