= Tsoungria =

Island in Greece

Native name: Τσουγκριά
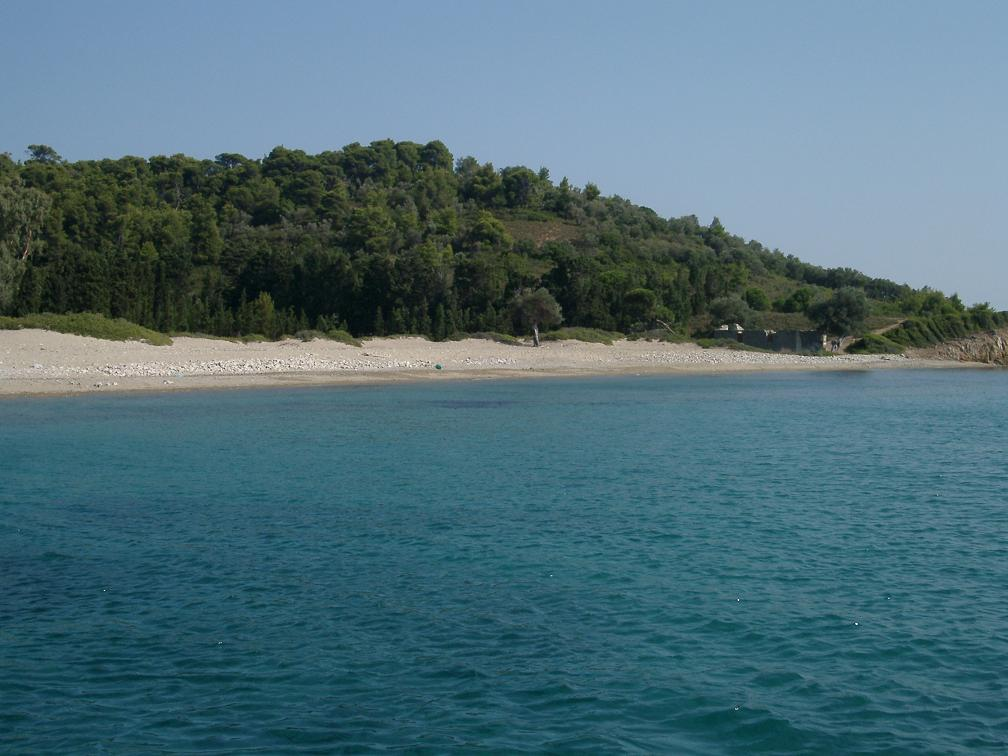
- The coastline of Tsoungria

- Location within Greece

Geography
- Coordinates: 39.12°N 23.50°E
- Archipelago: Sporades
- Highest elevation: 90 m (300 ft)

Administration
- Greece
- Region: Thessaly
- Regional unit: Sporades
- Municipality: Skiathos

Demographics
- Population: 0 (2011)

Tsougria, Tsoungria, or Tsougkria (Greek: Τσουγκριά, pronounced [t͡suˈgrʝa]) is a Greek island in the western part of the Sporades archipelago. As of 2011, it has 100 population, as it is a protected natural habitat. It is administratively part of the municipality of Skiathos and is located southeast of the island. The island has several beaches that are popular with yachts and round-island trips.
