= Steni Vala =

Village in Alonnisos, Greece

Coordinates: 39.194°N 23.924°E

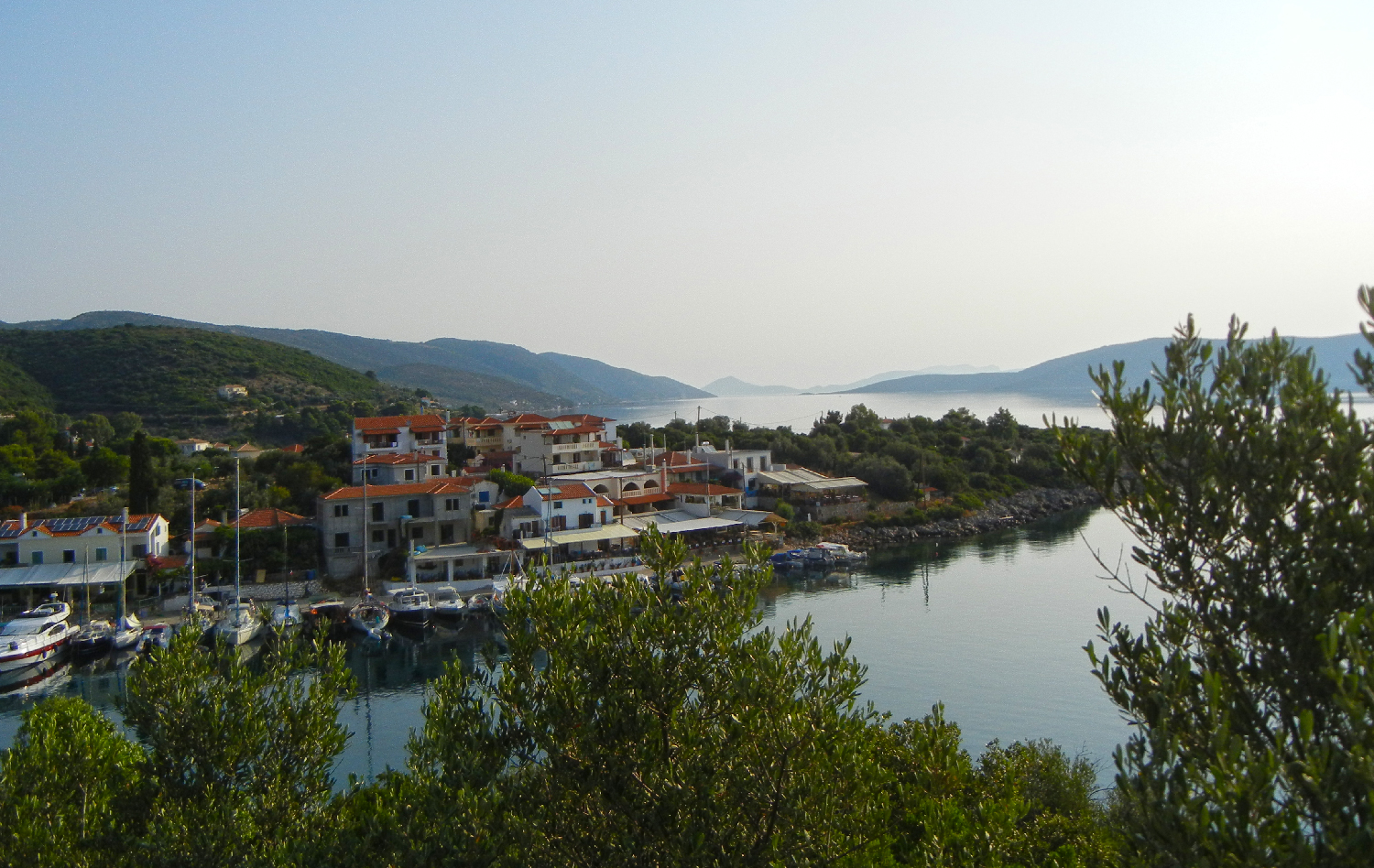

Steni Vala (Greek: Στενή Βάλα) is the second most populous village on the Greek island of Alonnisos. Located on the east coast roughly 11km north of Patitiri. It has several tavernas and a campsite. There is a large beach just north of the village.
