= Piperi (island) =

Greek island in the Aegean Sea

Native name: Πιπέρι
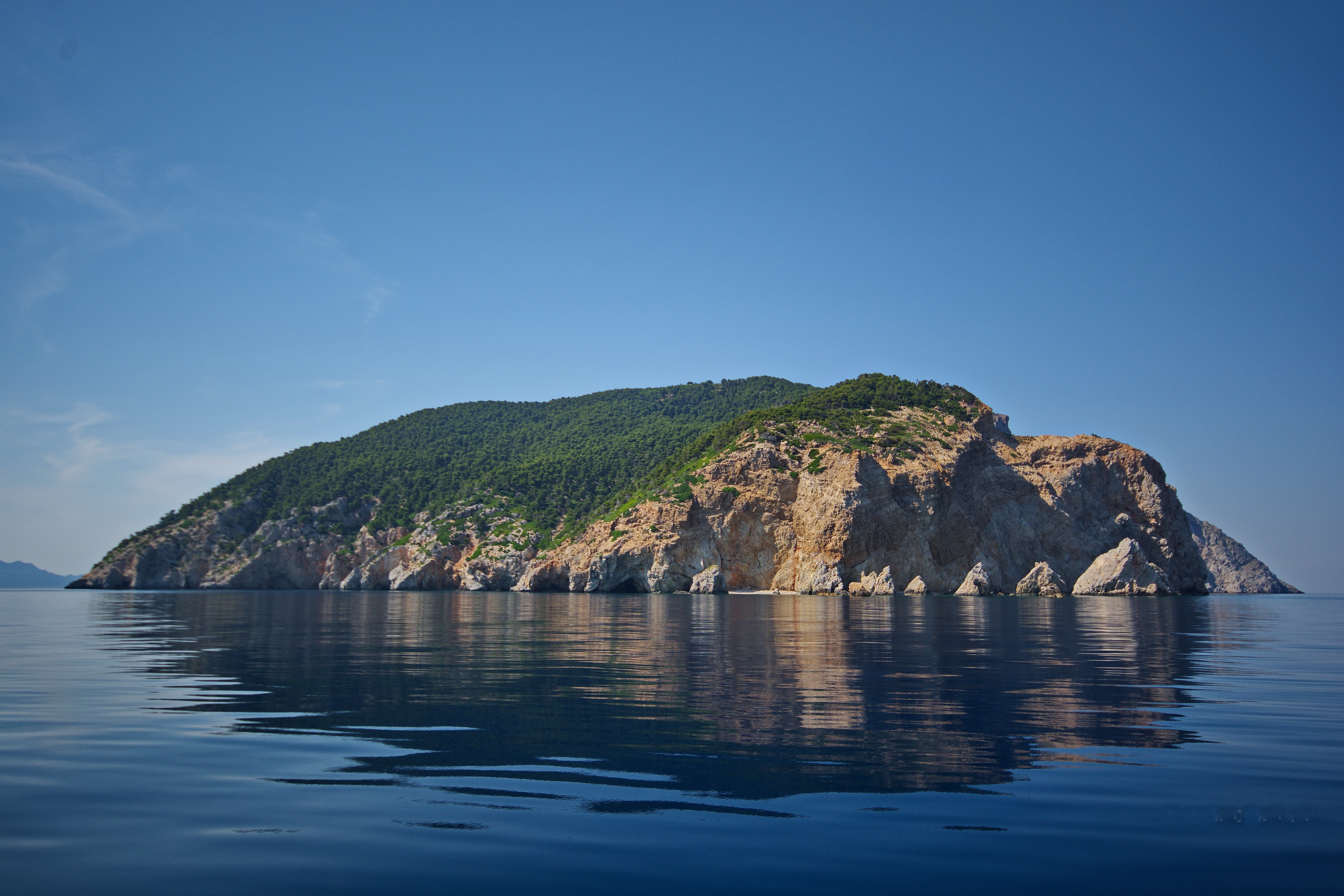
- View of Piperi

- Location within Greece

Geography
- Coordinates: 39.348°N 24.324°E
- Archipelago: Sporades
- Highest elevation: 324 m (1063 ft)

Administration
- Greece
- Region: Thessaly
- Regional unit: Sporades
- Municipality: Alonnisos

Demographics
- Population: 6 (2011)

Piperi (Greek: Πιπέρι pronounced [piˈperi], meaning pepper) is a Greek island in the Northern Sporades archipelago along the east coast of Greece, in the Aegean Sea. It is administratively part of the municipality of Alonnisos and, after Skyros, is the Sporades' easternmost island. Piperi is the core of the marine park and the approach within 3 nautical miles is forbidden. As of 2011, the resident population of the island was 6.

== Nearest islands and islets ==
Its nearest islands and islets are Gioura to the west and Psathoura to the northwest. The island of Piperi is in Zone A of the Alonnisos Marine Park, the core of the Park, and is strictly protected. Its approach by any vessel without special permission is forbidden. The restrictions protect important habitats of the monk seal and of the birds of prey which live and reproduce on the inaccessible rocks of the island, which are also home to some rare plant species. Piperi has precipitous, rocky shores and its vegetation is dominated by pine forests, although there are also some holly, frygana, and chasmophytes to be found on the cliffs. There are 33 species of birds and it is estimated that the island is home to about 350–400 pairs of Eleonora's falcon (Falco eleonorae).
