= Patitiri =

Patitiri Πατητήρι
- Settlement
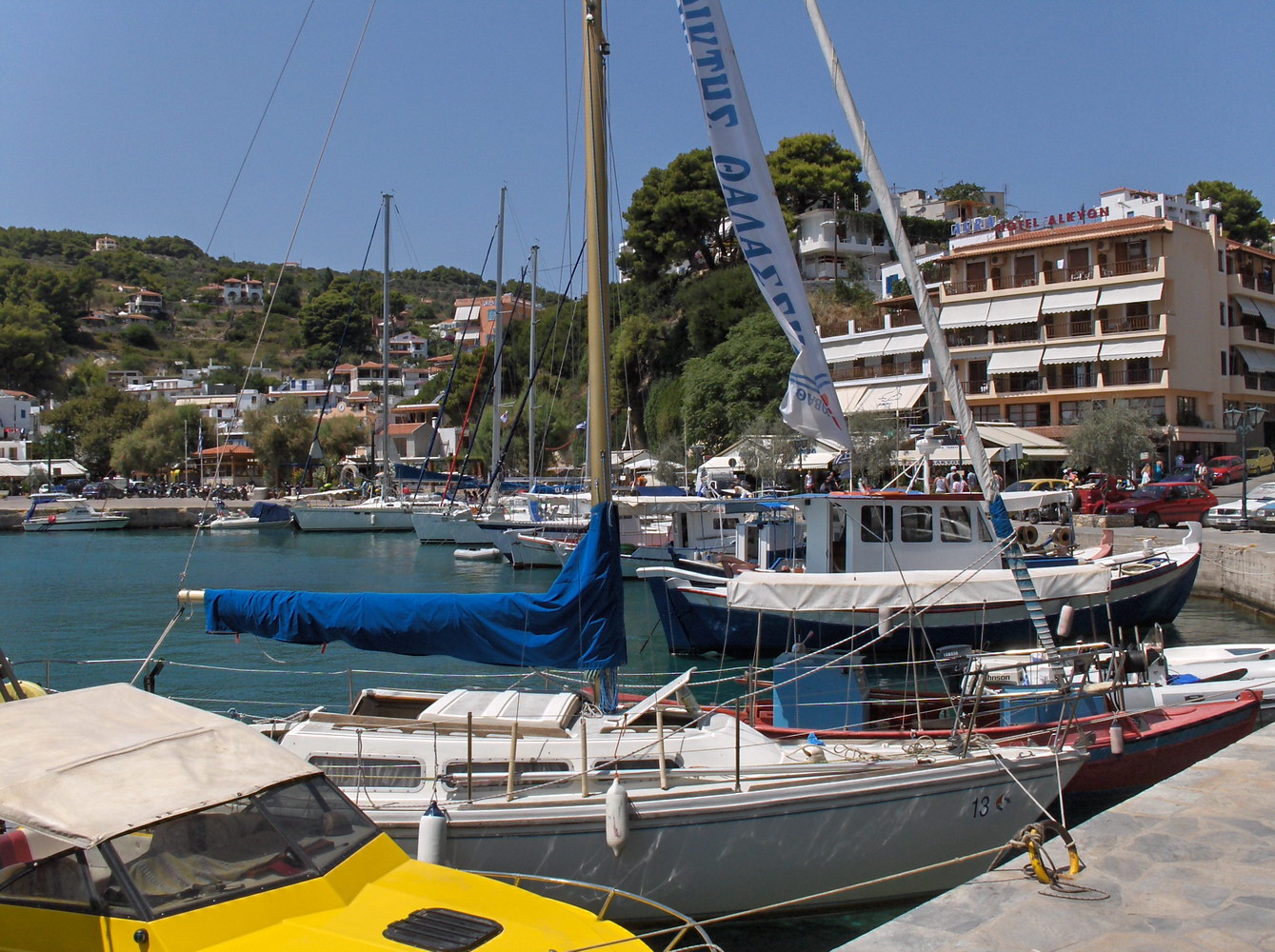
- Port of Patitiri

- Location within Greece
- Coordinates: 39°8.7′N 23°51.8′E
- Country: Greece
- Administrative region: Thessaly
- Regional unit: Sporades
- Municipality: Alonnisos

Population (2021)
  - Total: 1,387
- Time zone: UTC+2 (EET)
  - Summer (DST): UTC+3 (EEST)
- Postal code: 370 04
- Area code: 11
- Vehicle registration: BO

Patitiri (Greek: Πατητήρι) is the capital town of the island of Alonnisos in the Sporades archipelago, Greece. It is located in the southern part of the island. Patitiri was destroyed in the 1965 earthquake.

== Population ==
Year	Population
1961	366
1991	1,846
2001	1,697
2011	1,628
2021	1,387
