= Skantzoura =

Greek island in the Aegean Sea

Native name: Σκάντζουρα
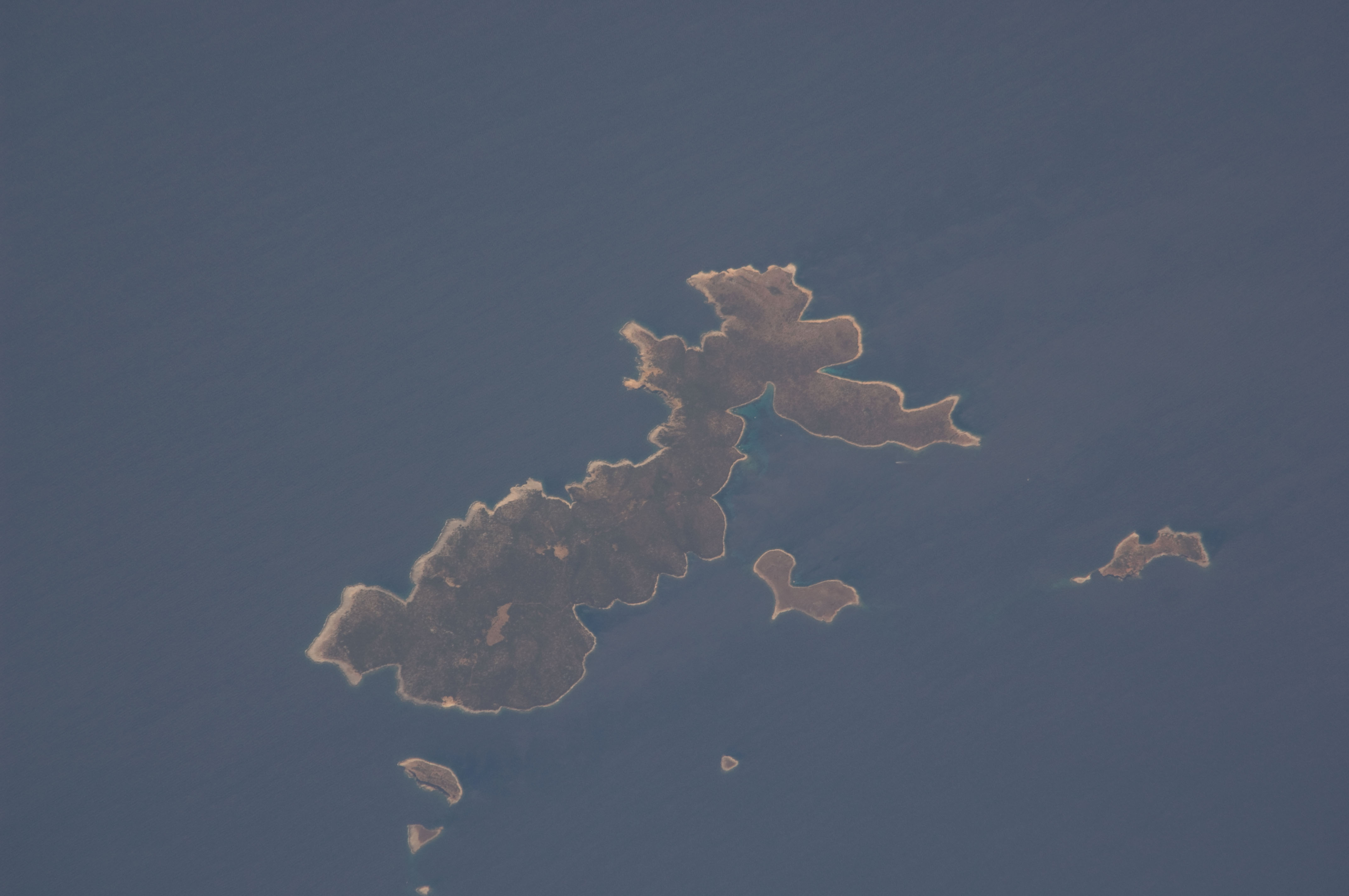

- Location within Greece

Geography
- Coordinates: 39.08°N 24.11°E
- Archipelago: Sporades
- Highest elevation: 107 m (351 ft)

Administration
- Greece
- Region: Thessaly
- Regional unit: Sporades
- Municipality: Alonnisos

Demographics
- Population: 0 (2011)

Skantzoura (Greek: Σκάντζουρα) is an island in the Sporades archipelago, along the east coast of Greece. The island is located 18 km (11 mi) southeast of the larger island of Alonnisos (to which it belongs administratively) and 31 km (19 mi) northwest of the island of Skyros. As of 2011, it had no resident population. Skantzoura is in Zone B of the Alonnisos Marine Park.

Anciently, the island was called Scandira or Skandeira (Ancient Greek: Σκανδείρα) and Scandila.
