= Gioura =

Unpopulated island in the Sporades, Greece

Native name: Γιούρα
- Location within Greece

Geography
- Coordinates: 39.39°N 24.17°E
- Archipelago: Sporades
- Total islands: 3
- Highest elevation: 177 m (581 ft)
- Highest point: Mt. Vouni

Administration
- Greece
- Region: Thessaly
- Regional unit: Sporades
- Municipality: Alonnisos

Demographics
- Population: 0 (2011)

Additional information
- Postal code: 370 05
- Area code: 24240
- Vehicle registration: BO

Gioura (Greek: Γιούρα pronounced [ˈʝura]), sometimes romanized as Youra, is a Greek island and abandoned settlement in the eastern part of the Northern Sporades archipelago. It is administratively part of the municipality of Alonnisos. The island's name comes from the ancient Greek Gerontia (Γεροντία). The 1991 census counted one inhabitant, making it the smallest municipal district in Greece in terms of population. As of 2011, it had no resident population. Gioura is in Zone A of the Alonnisos Marine Park.

The Cyclops Cave is the largest cave in the Sporades, and an archaeological site dating from the Mesolithic through the Late Neolithic periods.

== Nearest islands and islets ==
Its nearest islands and islets are Pelagos/ Kyra Panagia to the west, Psathoura to the north and Piperi to the east.
