= Peristera =

Greek island in the Aegean Sea

Native name: Περιστέρα
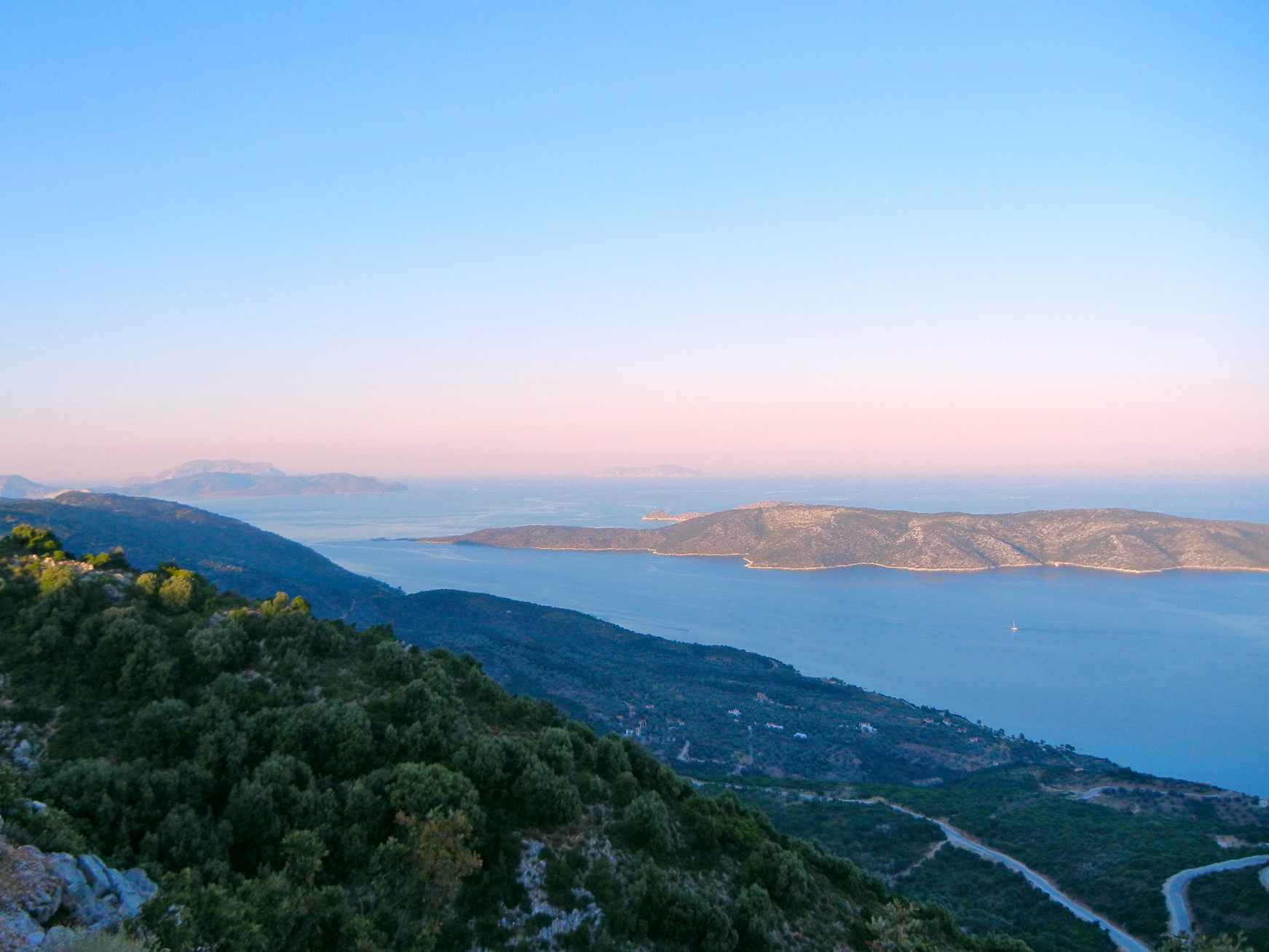

- Location within Greece

Geography
- Coordinates: 39.18°N 23.97°E
- Archipelago: Sporades
- Total islands: 2
- Highest elevation: 250 m (820 ft)
- Highest point: Mt. Stefani

Administration
- Greece
- Region: Thessaly
- Regional unit: Sporades
- Municipality: Alonnisos

Demographics
- Population: 30 (2011)

Additional information
- Postal code: 37005
- Area code: 24240
- Vehicle registration: BO

Peristera (Greek: Περιστέρα, feminine form of pigeon), also Aspro, locally Xero (meaning dry), Eudemia in antiquity, is a Greek island in the Sporades, in the Aegean Sea. It is administratively part of the municipality of Alonnisos and is also directly east of the namesake island. As of 2011, the resident population of the island was 30. Peristera is in Zone B of the Alonnisos Marine Park. The Peristera shipwreck, a 5th-century BC merchant vessel, is located off Peristera.

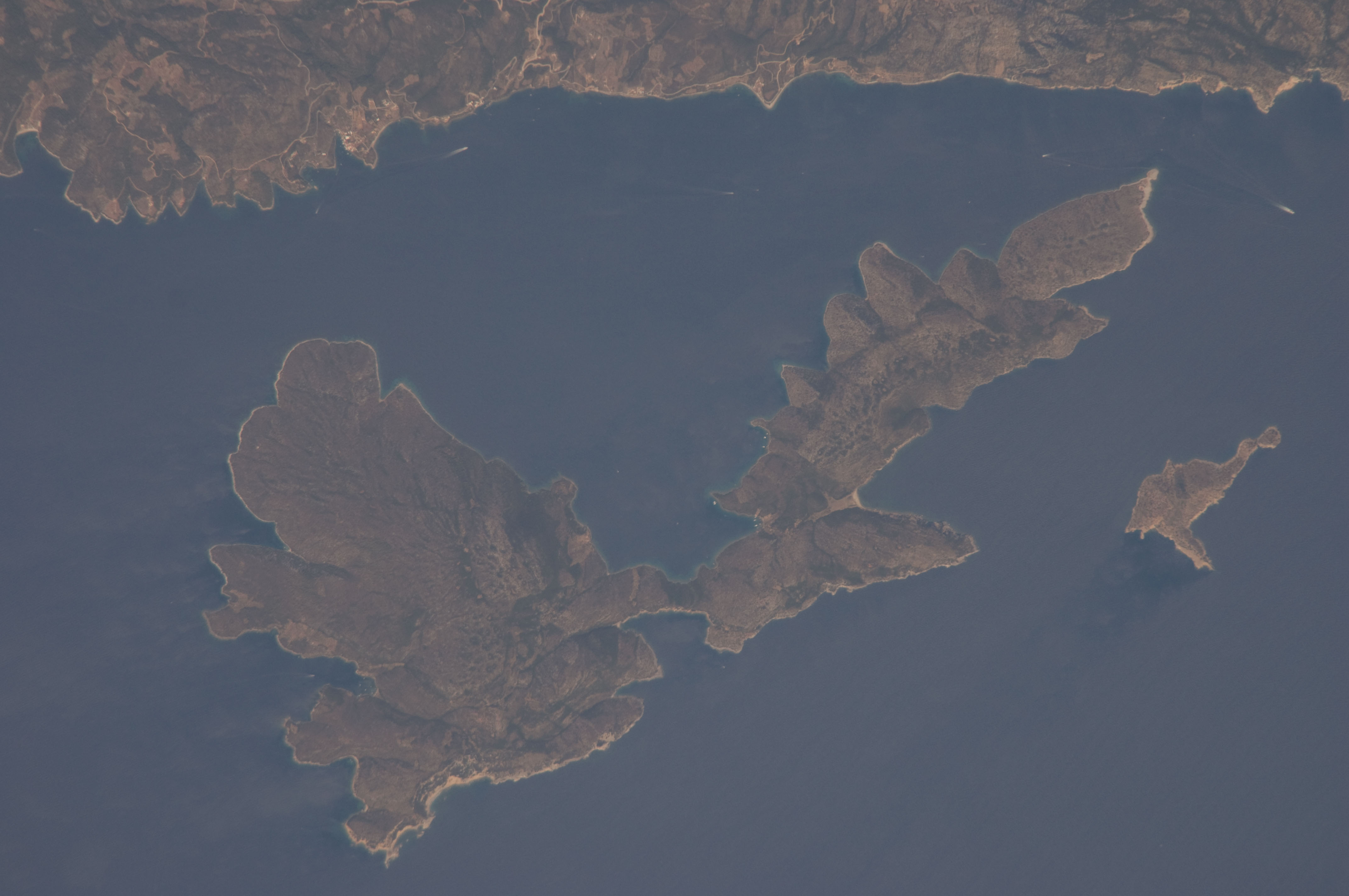
The Island of Peristera as seen from space

== Nearest islands and islets ==
Its nearest islands and islets are Alonnisos to the north and west and Adelfoi Islets to the west.
