= Kyra Panagia =

Greek island in the Aegean Sea

Kira Panagia
Native name: Κυρά Παναγιά
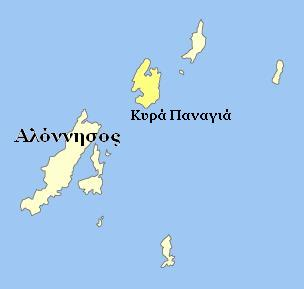

- Location within Greece

Geography
- Coordinates: 39.33°N 24.07°E
- Archipelago: Sporades
- Total islands: 2
- Highest elevation: 302 m (991 ft)
- Highest point: Mt. Panagias

Administration
- Greece
- Region: Thessaly
- Regional unit: Sporades
- Municipality: Alonnisos

Demographics
- Population: 2 (2011)

Additional information
- Postal code: 370 05
- Area code: 24240
- Vehicle registration: BO

Kyra Panagia (Greek: Κυρά Παναγιά [ciˈra panaˈʝa]) is a Greek island in the Sporades archipelago, in the northern Aegean Sea. It is administratively part of the municipality of Alonnisos in the Sporades regional unit. The island is also known by the name of Pelagos and rarely Pelagonisi. In Antiquity it was known as Ephthyros (Έφθυρος) and Polyaigos (Πολύαιγος). A bay in the southwest of the island is named Agios Petros. Kyra Panagia has belonged to the Athonite monastery of Megisti Lavra, located on Mount Athos, since it was granted the island by the Byzantine emperor Nikephoros II Phokas in 963. There is a monastery renovated in 2017 after 8 years of work and inhabited by a single monk, on the east coast of the island. As of 2011, the resident population of the island was 2. Kyra Panagia is in Zone A of the Alonnisos Marine Park.

== Nearest islands and islets ==
Its nearest islands and islets are Gioura to the northeast and the main island of Alonnisos to the southwest.
