= Sporades =

Sporades Περιφερειακή ενότητα Σποράδων
- Regional unit
- Municipalities of Sporades

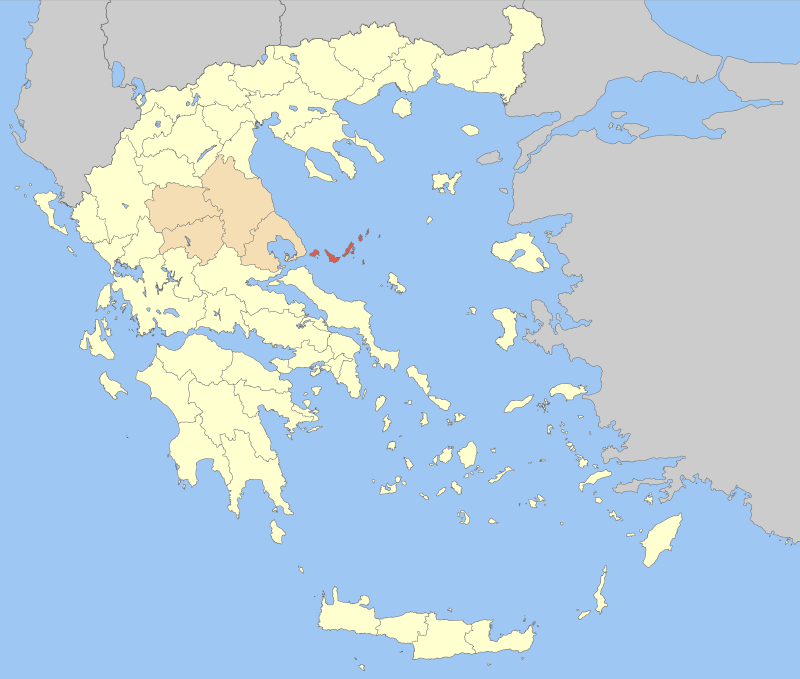
- Sporades within Greece

- Location within Greece
- Coordinates: 39°7′N 23°43′E
- Country: Greece
- Administrative region: Thessaly

Area
  - Total: 275.7 km^{2} (106.4 sq mi)

Population (2021)
  - Total: 13,458
  - Density: 48.81/km^{2} (126.4/sq mi)
- Time zone: UTC+2 (EET)
  - Summer (DST): UTC+3 (EEST)

The (Northern) Sporades (Note: /ˈspɒrədiːz/; Greek: Βόρειες Σποράδες, Vóries Sporádhes [ˈvories spoˈraðes]) are an archipelago along the east coast of Greece, northeast of the island of Euboea, in the Aegean Sea. They consist of 24 islands, four of which are permanently inhabited: Alonnisos, Skiathos, Skopelos and Skyros. They may also be referred to as the Thessalian Sporades (Θεσσαλικές Σποράδες).

== Etymology ==
"Sporades" means "those scattered" (compare with "sporadic"). From Classical Antiquity the name has referred to the Aegean island groups outside the central archipelago of the Cyclades.

== Geography ==
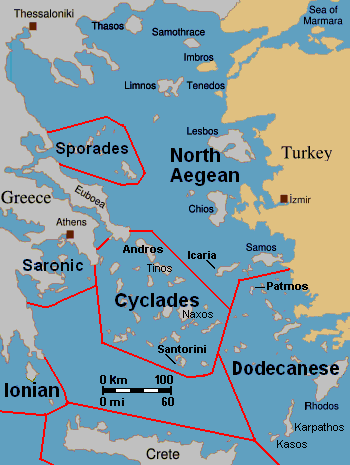
The Sporades within the Aegean Sea

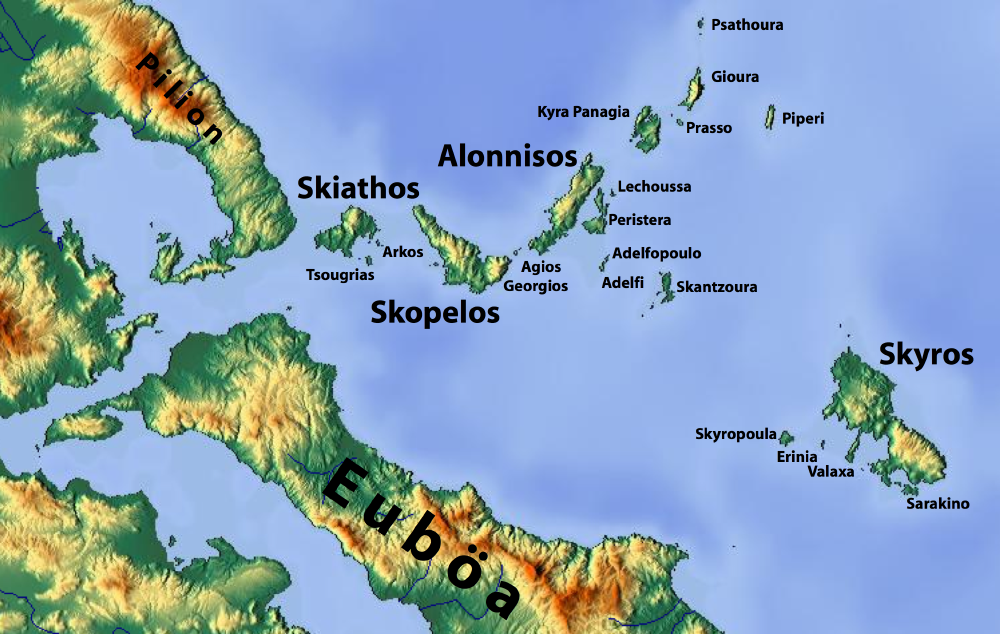
Northern Sporades

In modern geographical parlance, there are five different Sporades groups:

- Thessalian Sporades (Θεσσαλικές Σποράδες) or Northern Sporades. Since c. 1960, the term "Sporades" refers mainly to these islands:
  - Skopelos
  - Alonnisos
  - Skiathos
  - Skyros
  - Kyra Panagia
  - Peristera
  - Gioura
  - Skantzoura
  - Piperi
  - Tsougria
- Saronic Islands or Western Sporades(Δυτικές Σποράδες): Salamis, Aigina, Poros, Hydra, Spetses, and the other islands of the Saronic Gulf and the Myrtoan Sea.
- Southern Sporades (Νότιες Σποράδες), i.e. the Dodecanese, to which group Samos and Ikaria are sometimes appended.
- Eastern Sporades or Anatolic Sporades (Ανατολικές Σποράδες), i.e. the islands of the eastern and northeastern Aegean, near the coast of Asia Minor: Samos, Ikaria, Lesbos, Chios, Tenedos, Psara, Oinousses and smaller island groups.
- Thracian Sporades (Θρακικές Σποράδες): Thasos, Samothrace, Imbros, Lemnos and Agios Efstratios.

The two latter groups together form the North Aegean islands.

== Administration ==
As part of the 2011 Kallikratis government reform, the Sporades Regional Unit (Περιφερειακή Ενότητα Σποράδων) was created out of part of the former Magnesia Prefecture, region of Thessaly. The regional unit is subdivided into 3 municipalities. These are:

- Skiathos (1)
- Skopelos (3)
- Alonnisos (2)

The island of Skyros and a few uninhabited islets in its area are part of the Euboea regional unit and the administrative region of Central Greece.

== See also ==
- List of islands of Greece

== Sources ==
- "Skyros – Britannica Concise" (description), Britannica Concise, 2006, webpage: EB-Skyros.
