= Skiathos (town) =

Skiathos Σκιάθος
- Settlement
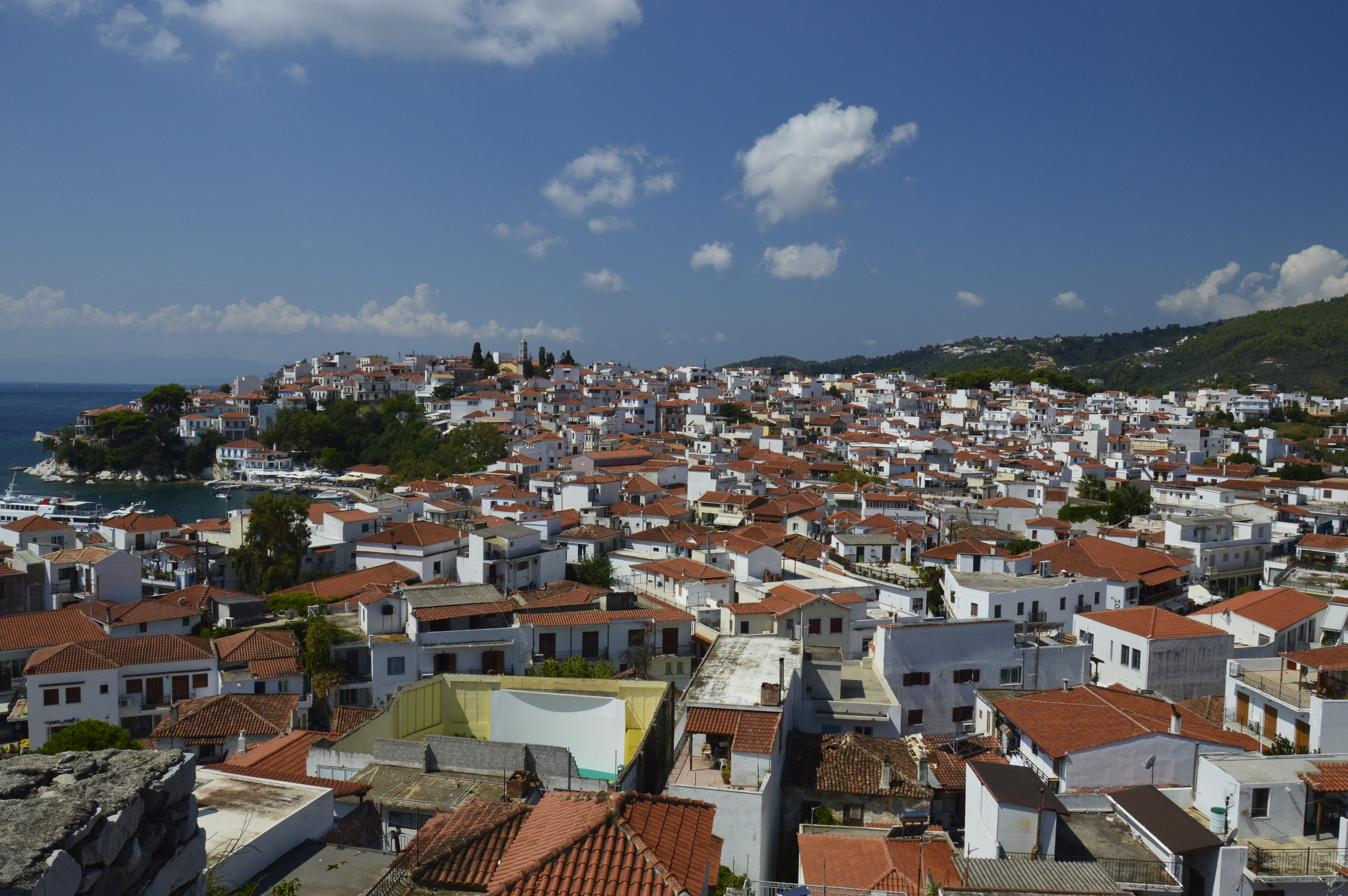
- Skiathos town

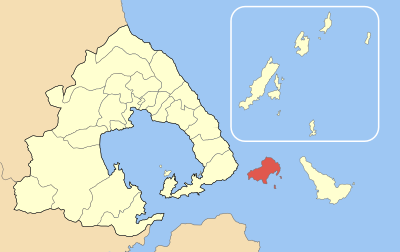

- Location within Greece
- Coordinates: 39°10′N 23°29′E
- Country: Greece
- Administrative region: Thessaly
- Regional unit: Sporades
- Municipality: Skiathos
- Highest elevation: 436 m (1,430 ft)
- Lowest elevation: 0 m (0 ft)

Population (2021)
  - Total: 4,897
- Time zone: UTC+2 (EET)
  - Summer (DST): UTC+3 (EEST)
- Postal code: 370 02
- Area code: 24270
- Vehicle registration: ΒΟ
- Website: www.n-skiathos.gr

Skiathos (Greek: Σκιάθος) is a city on the island of Skiathos in the Aegean Sea belonging to Greece. Skiathos town has a school, a lyceum, a gymnasium, many churches, banks, a post office, and a square. It has a port which shelters small boats and from where ferry services connect to Skopelos, Volos, Agios Konstantinos and the rest of Greece.

== History ==
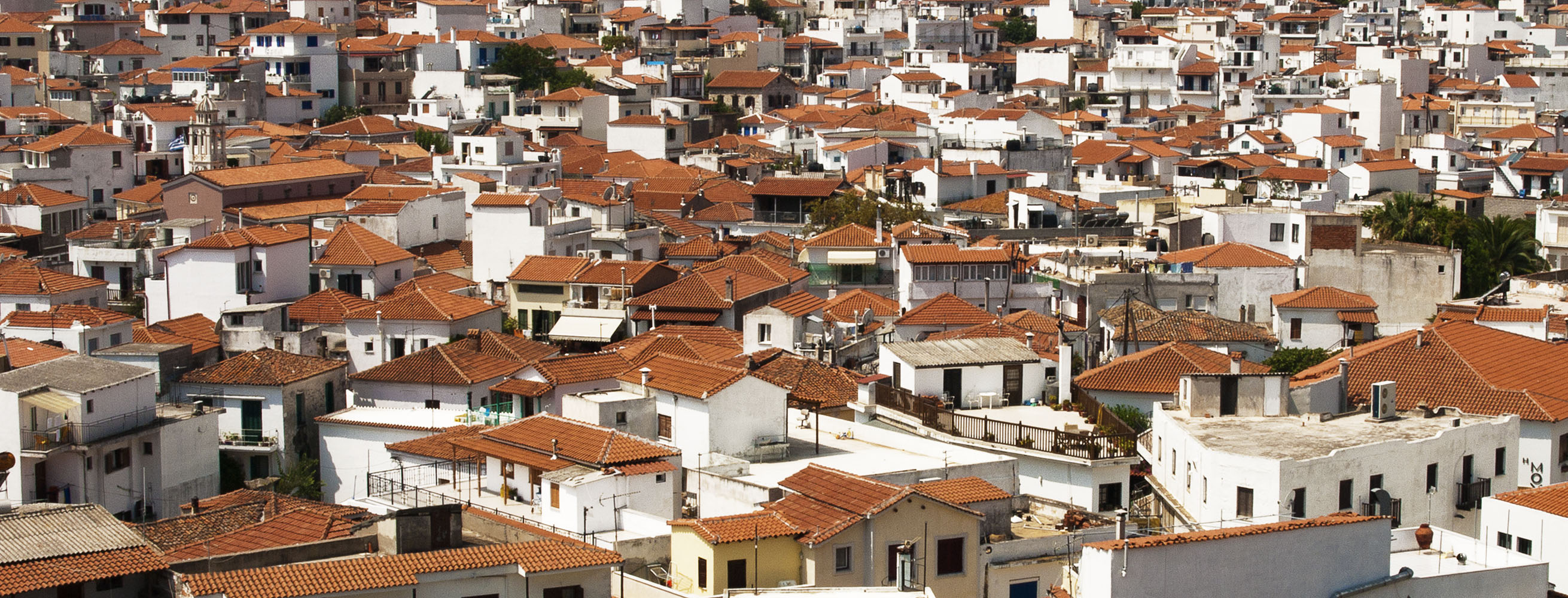
Overview of Skiathos

In Ancient times, the island played a minor role during the Persian Wars. In 480 BC, the fleet of the Persian king Xerxes was hit by a storm and was badly damaged on the rocks of the Skiathos coast. Following this the Greek fleet was held to stalemate with the Persian fleet at Artemisium but finally managed to destroy the Persian fleet at the Battle of Salamis. Skiathos remained in the Delian League until it lost its independence. The city was destroyed by Philip V of Macedon in 200 BC.

=== Venetian Era ===
In 1207 the brothers Geremia and Andrea Ghisi captured the island and built the Bourtzi, a small Venetian-styled fortress similar to the Bourtzi in Nafplio, on an islet just out of Skiathos town, to protect the capital from the pirates. But the Bourtzi was ineffective in protecting the population and in the mid-14th century the inhabitants moved the capital from the ancient site to Kastro, located on a high rock, overlooking a steep cliff above the sea at the northernmost part of the island. Kastro remained the only settlement of the island until the end of the Greek War of Independence, when the island's capital was relocated to the original site, where it still remains.

=== Ottoman Era ===
In 1704 monks from Athos built the Evangelistria Monastery, Skiathos which played a part in the Greek War of Independence as a hide-out for Greek rebels. The first flag of Greece was created and hoisted in Skiathos in 1807. Several prominent military leaders. (including Theodoros Kolokotronis and Andreas Miaoulis), had gathered there for consultation concerning an uprising, and they were sworn to this flag by the local bishop.

During the 19th century Skiathos became an important shipbuilding centre in the Aegean due to the abundance of pine forests on the island. The pine woods of the island were then almost obliterated. This was brought to a halt though, due to the emergence of steamboats. A small shipwright remains north of Skiathos town, which still builds traditional Greek caïques.

=== Modern Skiathos ===
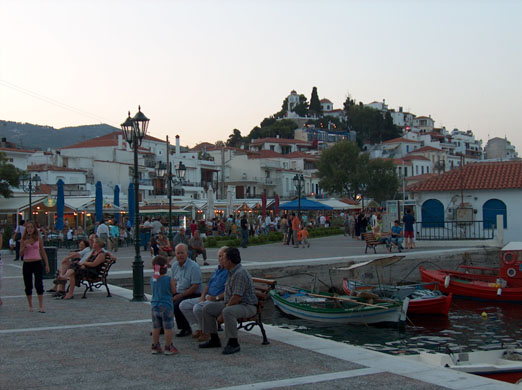
A snapshot from Skiathos.

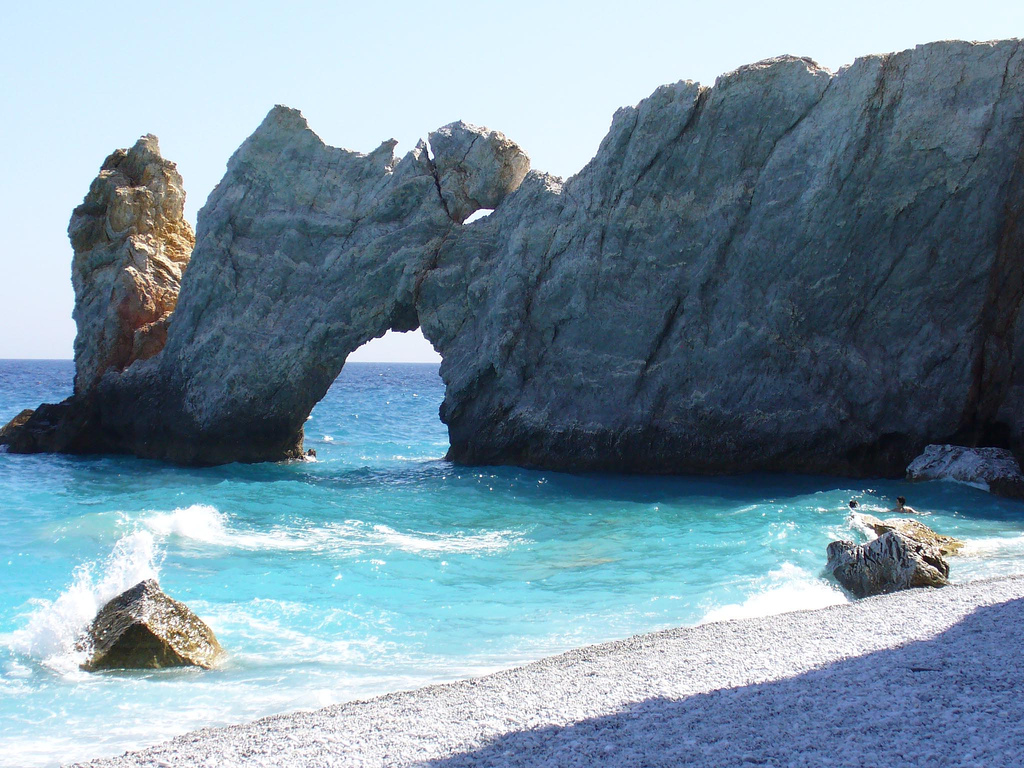
Lalaria beach.

In 1964 Skiathos was designated by the Greek National Tourism Organisation as a development zone for tourism. The results of this decision have largely transformed the island, due to tourist-orientated construction projects. These include the construction of the coast road from Skiathos town to Koukounaries, the construction of Skiathos Airport in 1984 and the construction of the first large hotel over Koukounaries beach. Along the coast road many hotels have been constructed since the island became an important tourist destination.

There were protests in the early-2000s, one against mining in September 2002 as they were pushing away mining trucks which was owned by the municipality and another in 2004, a power line which would have connect hydro with the rest of the Sporades was also being protested due to the plan being in a forested area.

== Culture and intellectual life ==
Skiathos has a notable literary and artistic tradition shaped by several prominent writers, scholars, and musicians. This heritage spans from the 19th- and early 20th-century prose of Alexandros Papadiamantis and Alexandros Moraitidis, as well as the poetry of Zisis Oikonomou and the folklore studies of priest and scholar Georgios Rigas, to contemporary music. The latter is represented by composer and guitarist Adonis Mitzelos, who has roots on the island and whose work encompasses Greek rock, entechno (artistic popular music), and orchestral compositions. In 2019, Mitzelos founded the cultural institution "Skiathos of the Poets" to promote the island's literary and intellectual heritage.

In the center of Skiathos town, the Papadiamantis House Museum operates in the two-storey house where Alexandros Papadiamantis lived and died. Built around 1860 by his father, the building was designated a protected historical monument by the Hellenic Ministry of Culture in 1965 and preserves original furnishings, manuscripts, and personal belongings of the author.

== Geography ==
The area around the villages and Skiathos Town are farmland. The island of Skopelos can be seen from Skiathos with the more distant islands of Euboea and Scyros also visible in clearer conditions.

== Transportation ==
There is frequent bus connection from Koukounaries to Skiathos town with buses stopping approximately every 20 minutes, costing €3.00 to travel from one end of the island to the other. Taxis are also very cheap.

Skiathos is served by Skiathos International Airport

== Historical Population ==
Year	Town
1981	4,129
1991	5,096
2001	6,160
2011	4,883
2021	4,897

== Gallery ==
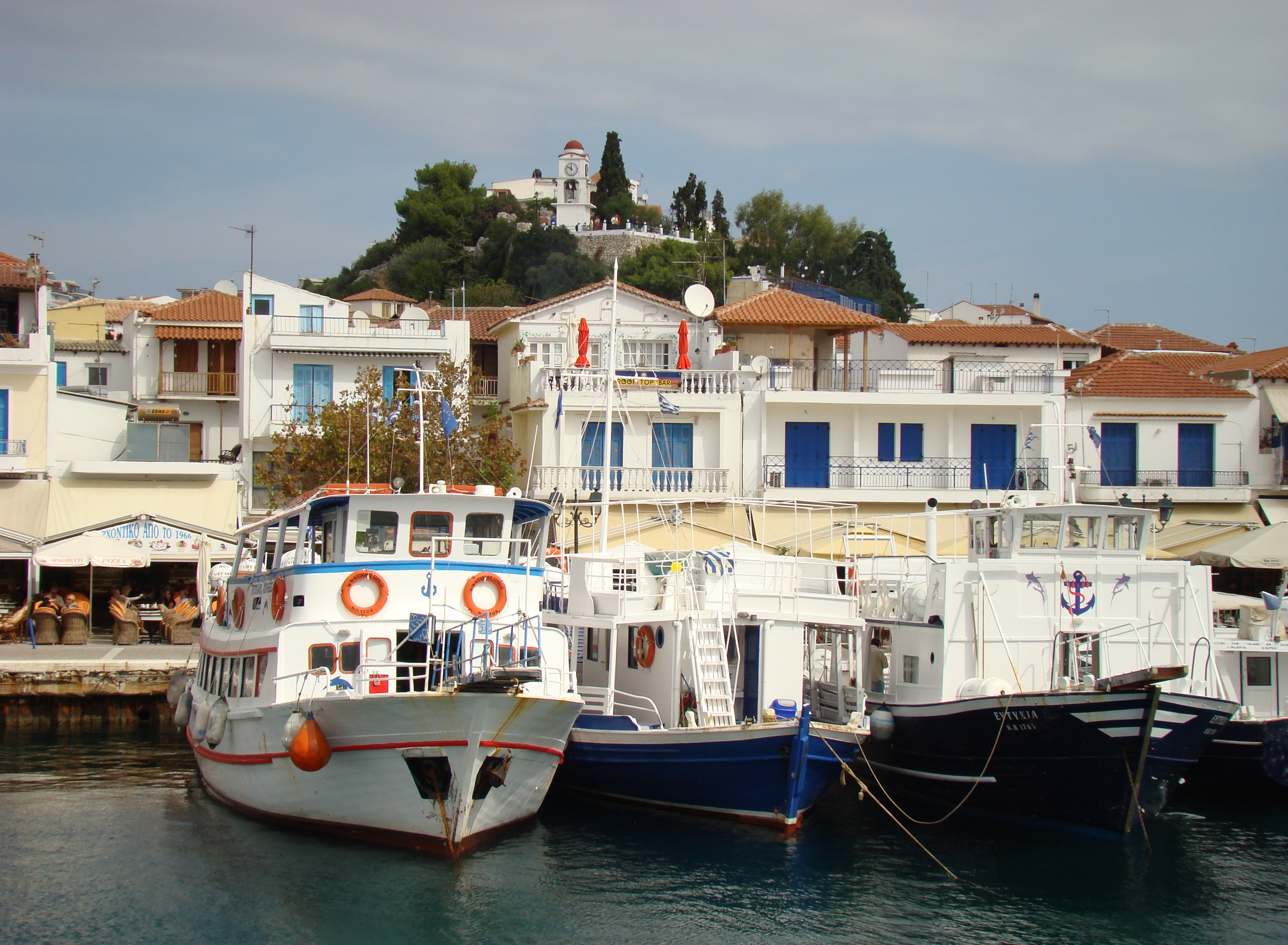
View of the port

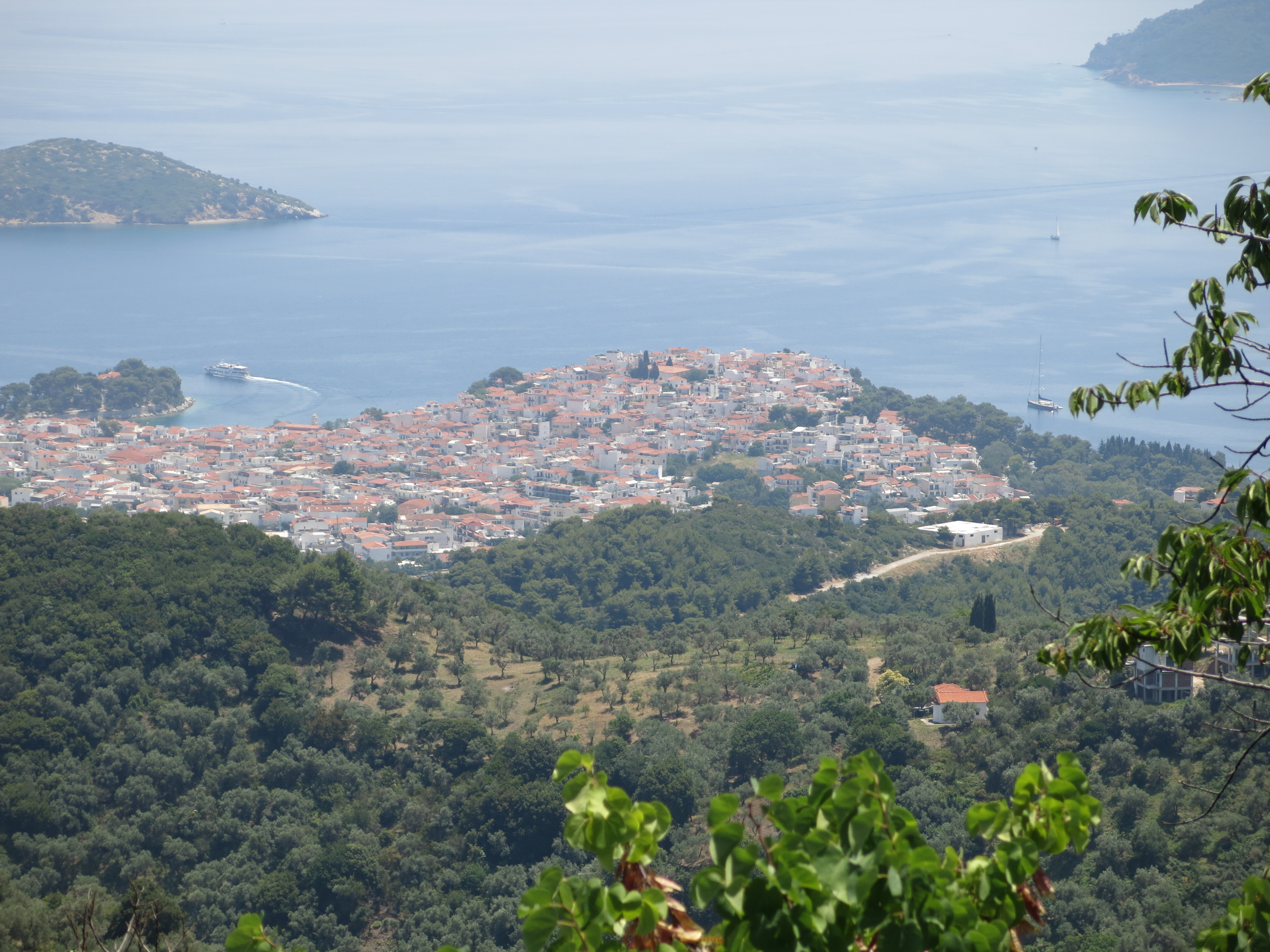
Panoramic view

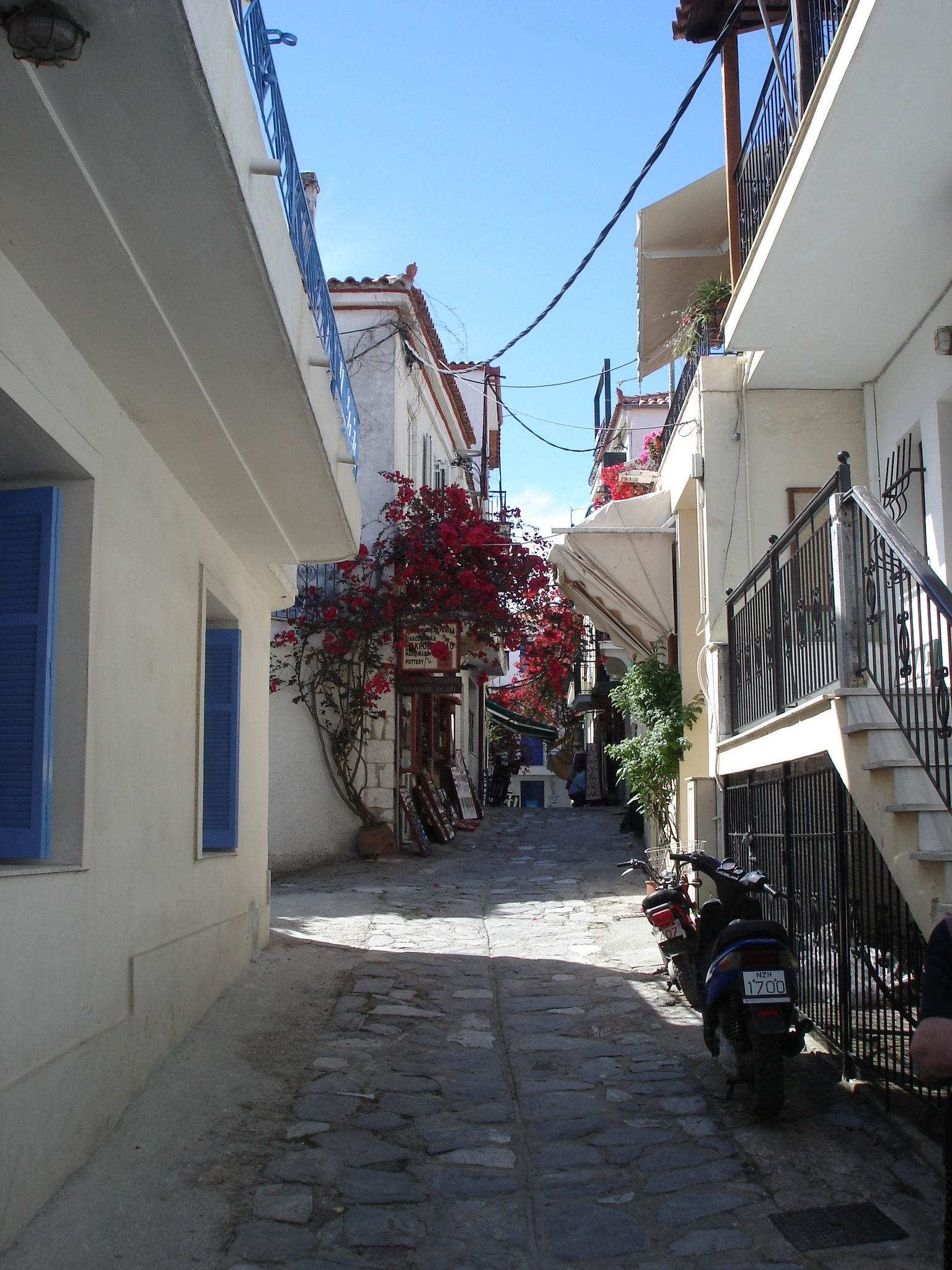
Street in Skiathos Town

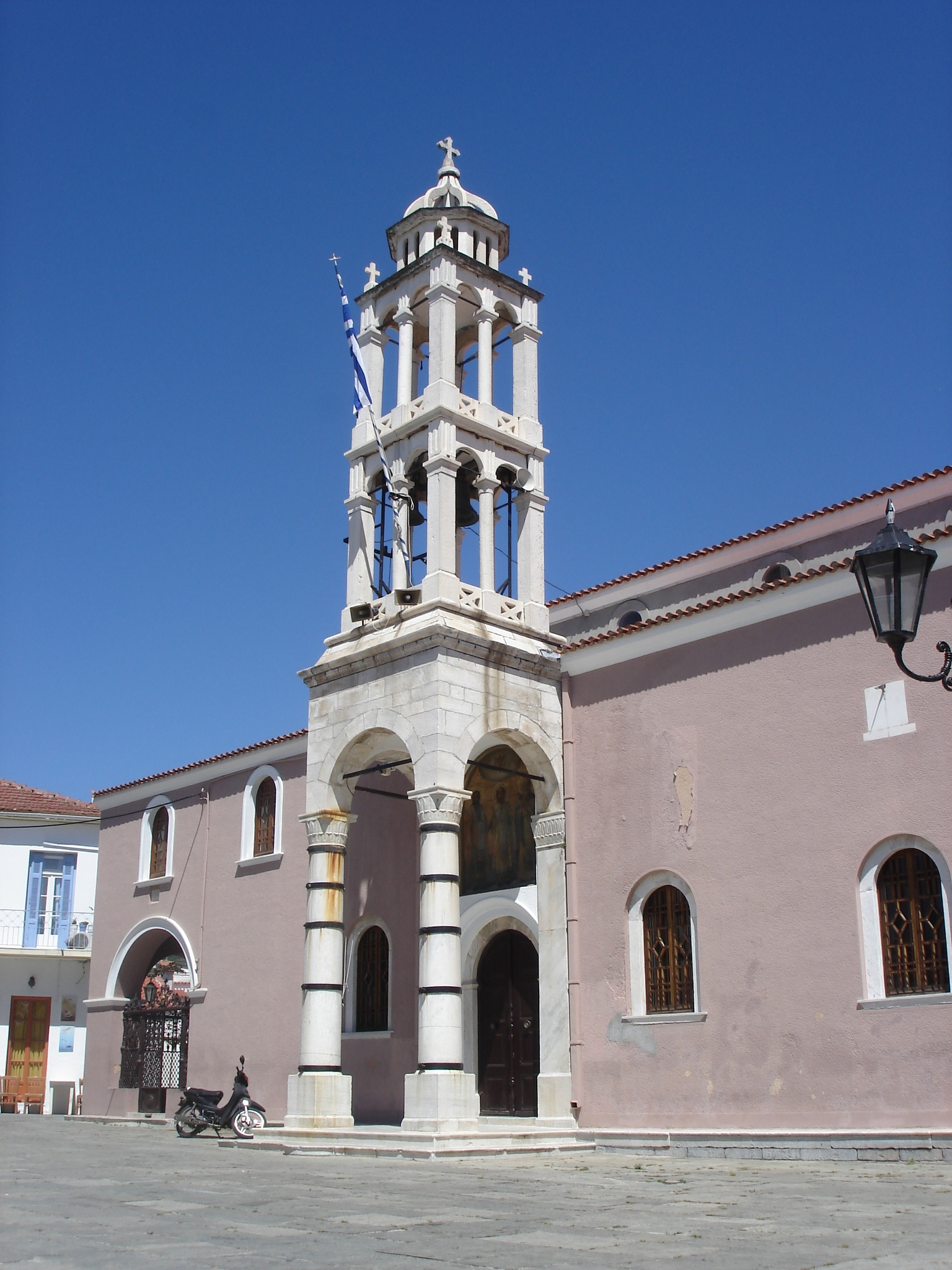
Church in Skiathos Town
