= Skiathos International Airport =

Skiathos International Airport "Alexandros Papadiamantis"

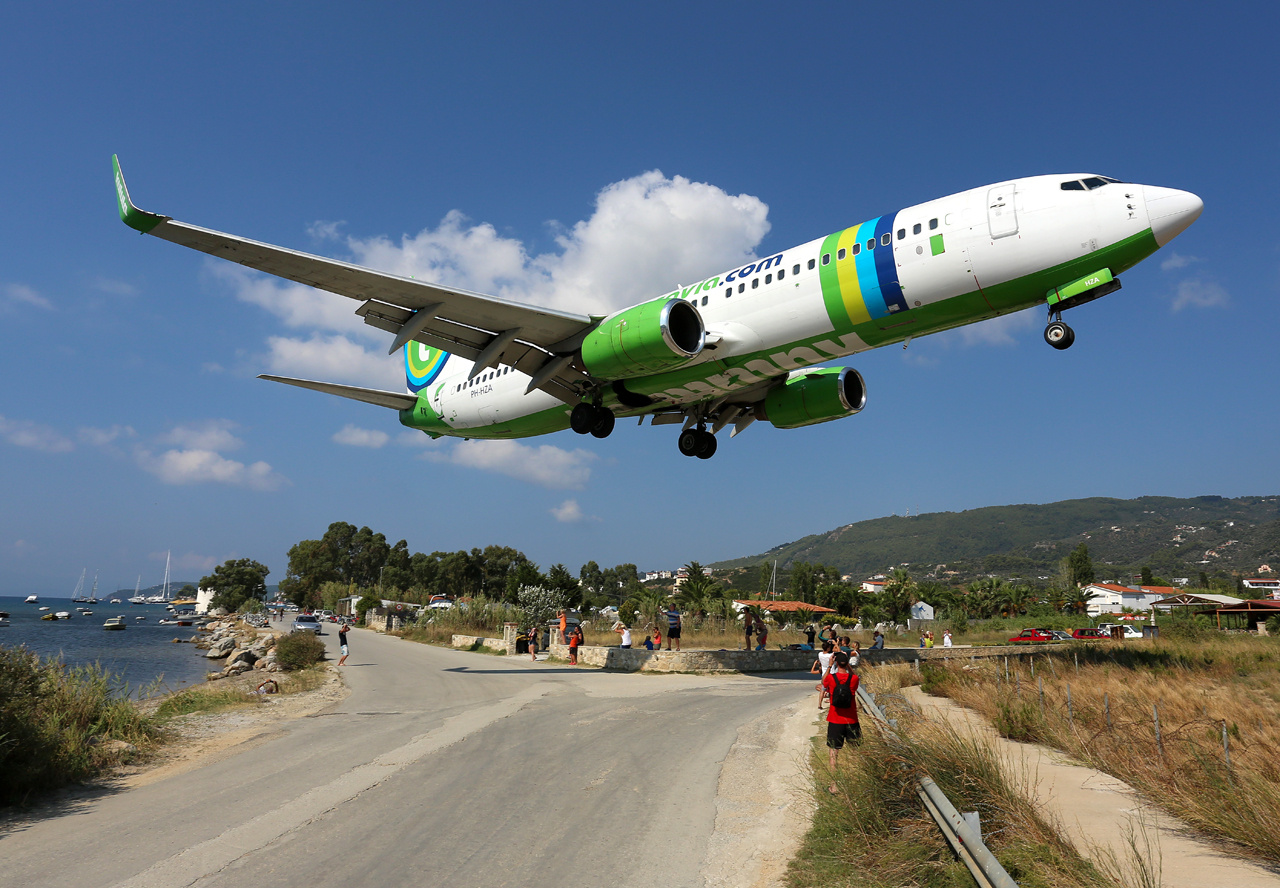
- IATA: JSI; ICAO: LGSK

Summary
- Airport type: Public
- Owner: Greek State
- Operator: Fraport AG/Copelouzos Group joint venture
- Location: Skiathos, Greece
- Elevation AMSL: 54 ft (16 m)
- Coordinates: 39°10′39″N 023°30′13.23″E
- Website: jsi-airport.en

Map
- Location of airport in Greece

Runways
Direction	Length		Surface
Direction	ft	m	Surface
01/19	5,341	1,628	Asphalt

Statistics (2024)
- Passengers: 600,786
- Passenger traffic change: ▲8.7%
- Aircraft movements: 5,149
- Aircraft movements change: ▼0.2%
- Source:Fraport Greece

Skiathos Alexandros Papadiamantis Airport (IATA: JSI, ICAO: LGSK) is an airport on the island of Skiathos, Greece. Its 5,341-foot (1,628-meter) runway is able to accommodate aircraft up to the size of a Boeing 757-200. The runway is characterised as 'short and narrow'. Because of the uneven terrain on the island of Skiathos, Skiathos Airport was created by reclaiming land from the sea between Skiathos island and the smaller island of Lazareta (a former leper colony) effectively joining the two islands into one larger island, though it was built on land already part of Skiathos. The location was chosen by a mechanic who lived in Volos. The airport is named after Alexandros Papadiamantis, a Greek novelist and native of the island.

The airport's short runway and its proximity to an adjacent public road have made it a popular destination for planespotters. It is often compared to Princess Juliana International Airport on Saint Maarten since both airports offer the public an ability to legally experience landing approaches and takeoffs at very close range.

== History ==
The airport first operated in 1972.

A passenger terminal and a new control tower was constructed in 1988 (38 years ago). In 2001 (25 years ago) the terminal was closed down after a minor earthquake, and a new passenger terminal opened in 2002, to better accommodate the growing number of passengers.

From 2019, as part of the Fraport construction works the airport has 2 current terminals. Terminal 1 was reconstructed and is currently the Domestic Terminal, and Terminal 2 is for international arrivals.

Skiathos Airport has no jetways, meaning, prior to the 2016 work, passengers walked the short distance from the aircraft to the terminal building. Now, buses drive passengers the short distance.

In 2014 the runway was extended by 110 metres (360 ft) on the north side of the airport. In 2016 an extension was added to the ramp for 6 airliner parking stands, along with an additional taxiway. The previous two parking stands are now used for smaller aircraft.

The island has only two roundabouts, one at the airport and one just outside of the Skiathos Town, operational in 2023. Its only set of traffic lights is at the southern end of the runway in an attempt to prevent jet blast accidents.

In December 2015, the privatization of Skiathos Island National Airport and 13 other regional airports of Greece was finalised with the signing of the agreement between the Fraport AG/Copelouzos Group joint venture and the state privatization fund. "We signed the deal today," the head of Greece's privatization agency HRADF, Stergios Pitsiorlas, told Reuters. According to the agreement, the joint venture will operate the 14 airports (including Skiathos Island National Airport) for 40 years as of 11 April 2017.

== Airlines and destinations ==
The following airlines operate regular scheduled and charter flights at Skiathos Airport:

Airlines	Destinations
Air Serbia	Seasonal charter: Belgrade
Avanti Air	Seasonal charter: Klagenfurt
Austrian Airlines	Seasonal: Vienna
British Airways	Seasonal: London–City
Cyprus Airways	Seasonal: Larnaca
Discover Airlines	Seasonal: Frankfurt, Munich,
easyJet	Seasonal: Basel/Mulhouse, Bristol, London–Gatwick, Manchester, Milan–Malpensa, Naples
Edelweiss Air	Seasonal: Zurich
Jet2.com	Seasonal: Birmingham, Bristol, East Midlands, Edinburgh (begins 6 May 2027), Leeds/Bradford, London–Gatwick, London–Luton, London–Stansted, Manchester, Newcastle upon Tyne
Neos	Seasonal: Milan–Malpensa,
Olympic Air	Athens
Scandinavian Airlines	Seasonal charter: Copenhagen, Gothenburg, Oslo, Stavanger, Stockholm–Arlanda
Ryanair	Seasonal: Bari, Bergamo, Bratislava, Bucharest–Otopeni, Budapest, Pisa, Prague, Rome–Fiumicino, Sofia
Sky Express	Athens
Sunclass Airlines	Seasonal charter: Copenhagen, Oslo, Stockholm–Arlanda
Transavia	Seasonal: Amsterdam, Paris–Orly
TUI Airways	Seasonal: Birmingham, Bristol, East Midlands, London–Gatwick, Manchester, Newcastle upon Tyne
TUI fly Netherlands	Seasonal: Amsterdam
Wizz Air	Seasonal: Milan–Malpensa, Naples, Rome–Fiumicino

== Statistics ==
The data taken from the official website of the airport.

Year	Passengers		
Year	Domestic	International	Total
2009	▼16,470	▼218,601	▼235,071
2010	▲16,880	▼213,609	▼230,489
2011	▲20,473	▲226,185	▲246,658
2012	▼18,465	▲236,440	▲254,905
2013	▲25,216	▲240,557	▲265,773
2014	▲32,097	▲283,300	▲315,397
2015	▲34,560	▲318,523	▲353,083
2016	▲44,174	▲350,827	▲395,001
2017	▲43,740	▲380,366	▲424,106
2018	▲48,228	▲389,688	▲437,916
2019	▲55,535	▲390,684	▲446,219
2020	▼19,541	▼69,375	▼88,916
2021	▲34,666	▲171,341	▲206,007
2022	▲49,775	▲461,836	▲511,611
2023	▲58,821	▲494,023	▲552,844
2024	▼58,375	▲542,411	▲600,786
2025	▲65,501	▲573,741	▲639,242

=== Traffic statistics by country (2024) ===
Traffic by country at Skiathos International Airport – 2024
Place	Country	Total passengers
1	United Kingdom	243,171
2	Italy	99,464
3	Greece	58,375
4	Austria	30,714
5	Sweden	27,597
6	Germany	26,338
7	Romania	21,284
8	Denmark	14,488
9	Norway	13,522
10	Czech Republic	13,237
11	Hungary	11,124
12	Serbia	10,670
13	France	8,792
14	Netherlands	6,404
15	Cyprus	6,310

== Ground transport ==
Skiathos Airport is located 4.5 km from the city of Skiathos and is accessible either from Skiathos ringroad or the coast road. The journey to and from the city centre takes about 10–15 minutes, depending on traffic. 24/7 metered taxi service is available outside the Skiathos Airport Terminal building.

== See also ==
- List of airports in Greece
