= Evangelistria Monastery, Skiathos =

Monastery

Coordinates: 39°11′23″N 23°28′48″E

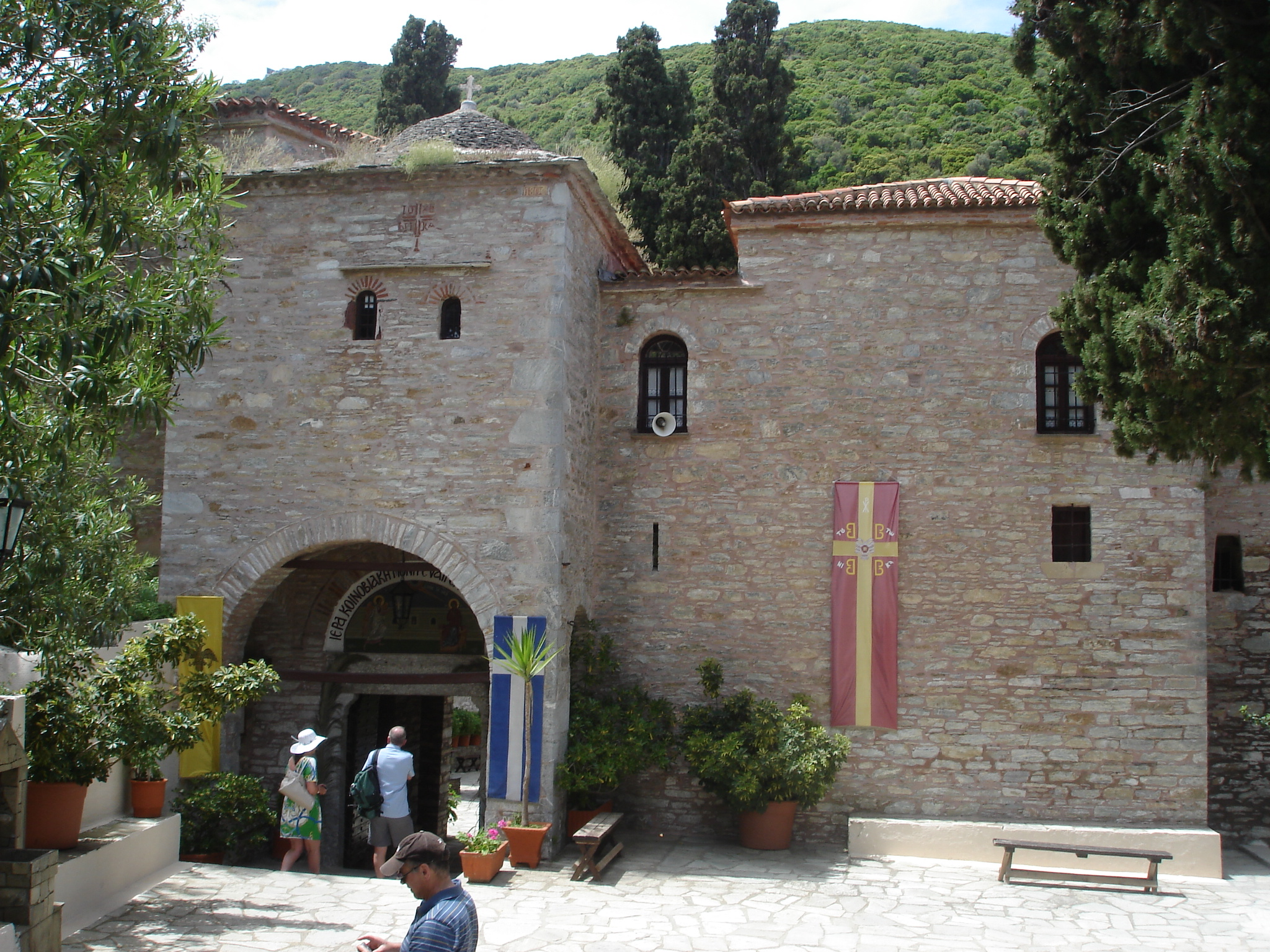
Monastery gatehouse

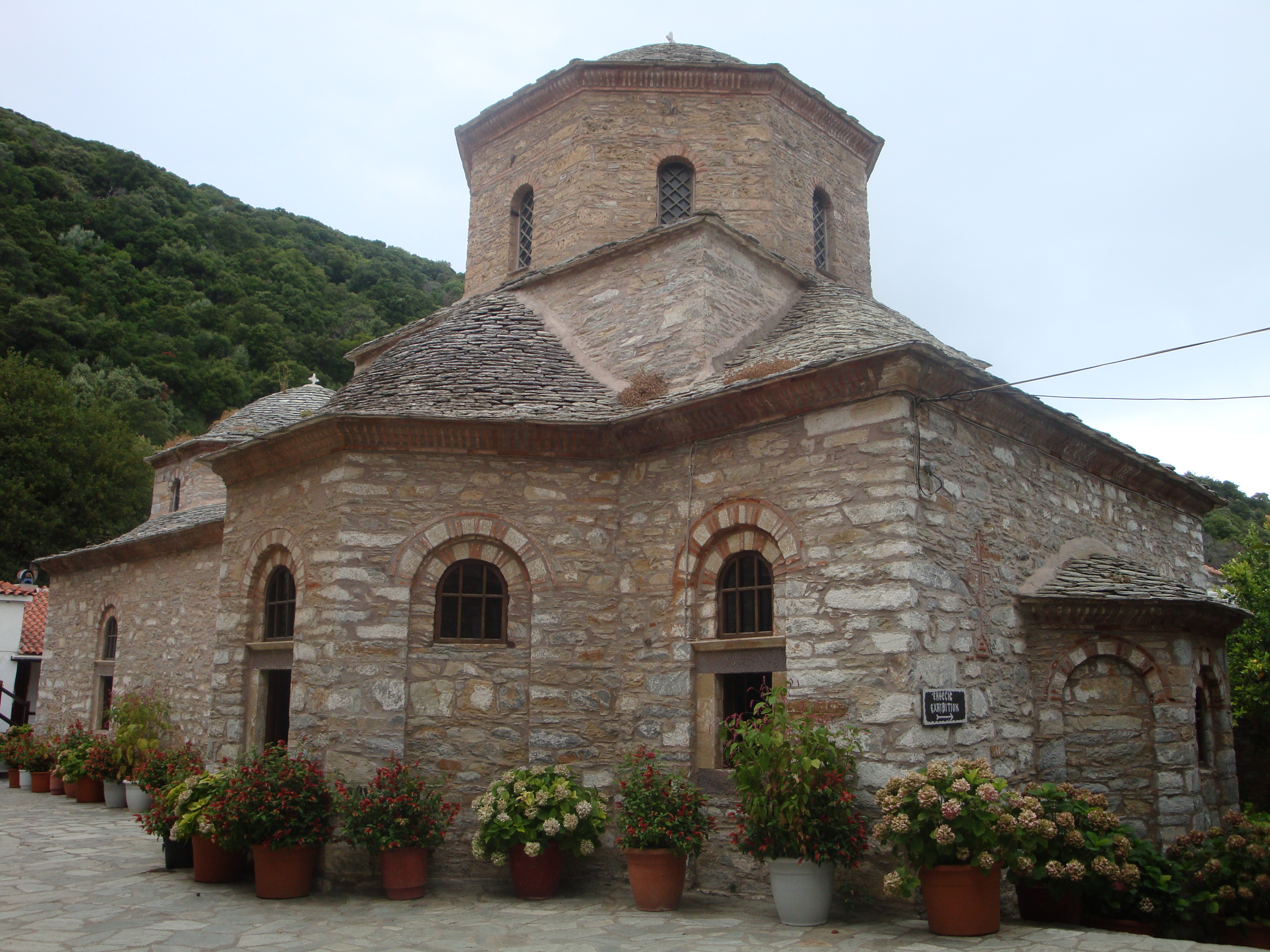
Catholicon of the Evangelistria Monastery

The Monastery of the Annunciation (Greek: Ιερά Μονή Ευαγγελισμού της Θεοτόκου), commonly known as the Evangelistria Monastery (Greek: Ιερά Μονή Ευαγγελίστριας), is a monastery dedicated to the Annunciation of the Virgin Mary which sits on a hillside some 4 km north of Skiathos town on the Greek island of Skiathos. Although some buildings are ruined, the church and accommodation buildings have been restored.

The monastery was founded in 1794 by a group of Kollyvades monks, who had left the monastery of Mount Athos after disagreements about matters of Christian ritual. They were led by an ordained monk, Niphon of Chios, and included Gregorios Hatzistamatis, a local monk who had inherited land on Skiathos from his father.

In 1807, a group of Greek freedom fighters met at the monastery and swore the Oath of Freedom on a newly designed Greek flag, a white cross on a sky-blue background, which was woven on a loom at the site. The fighters included Theodoros Kolokotronis, Andreas Vokos Miaoulis, Thymios Vlachavas, Nikotsaras and others.

The Catholicon of the monastery is a Byzantine-style cross-in-square three-aisled church, with three domes, and stands at the centre of the complex. The iconostasis is wood carved and bears icons dating from the 17th and 18th centuries.

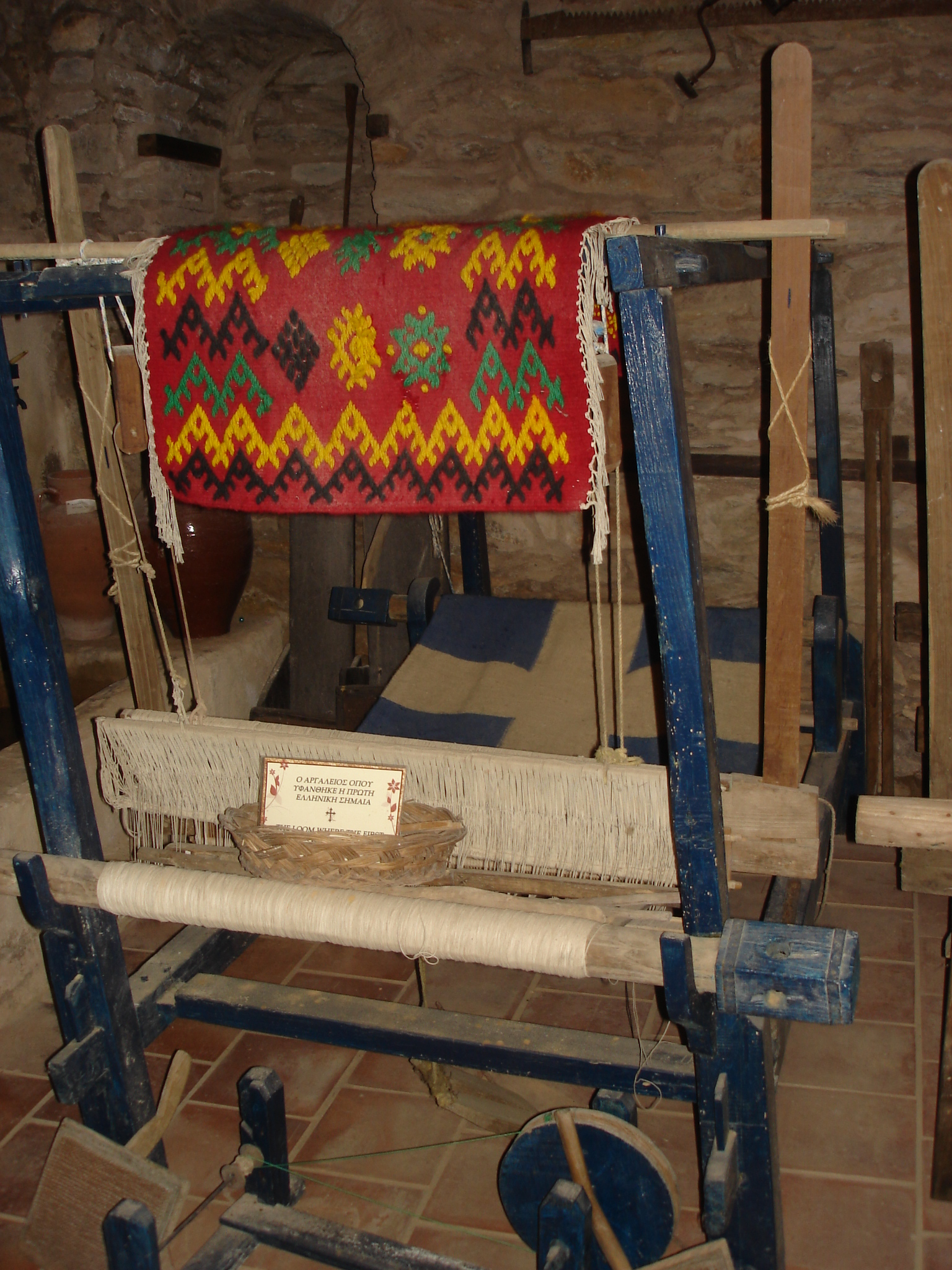
The loom on which the first Greek flag was made.

The museum houses ecclesiastical artefacts and presents information on the history of the Monastery such as priests' vestments, rare books and manuscripts from the 17th century, gospels from the 18th century, silver and wooden crosses and Byzantine icons. The loom on which the first Greek flag was created can be seen. There is also a photographic record of the subsequent Greek War of Independence, which lasted from 1821 until 1829.

Vineyards have been created for the production of Alypiakos, a red Muscat which was first produced on the island in the 5th century BC. The wine is named after Father Alypos, the fourth abbot of the monastery. Output has increased year on year, some of which is used within the Monastery on religious occasions.

Today, the monastery is served by only four resident monks; three others associated with the monastery reside elsewhere. On 25 March each year the ceremony of the Annunciation of the Virgin Mary takes place.

Access is by foot from Skiathos town up a steep metalled road or by public minibus from Skiathos town bus terminus. Entrance to the monastery itself is usually free.
