= Skiathos =

Island in the Northern Sporades, Greece

Skiathos Σκιάθος
- Municipality
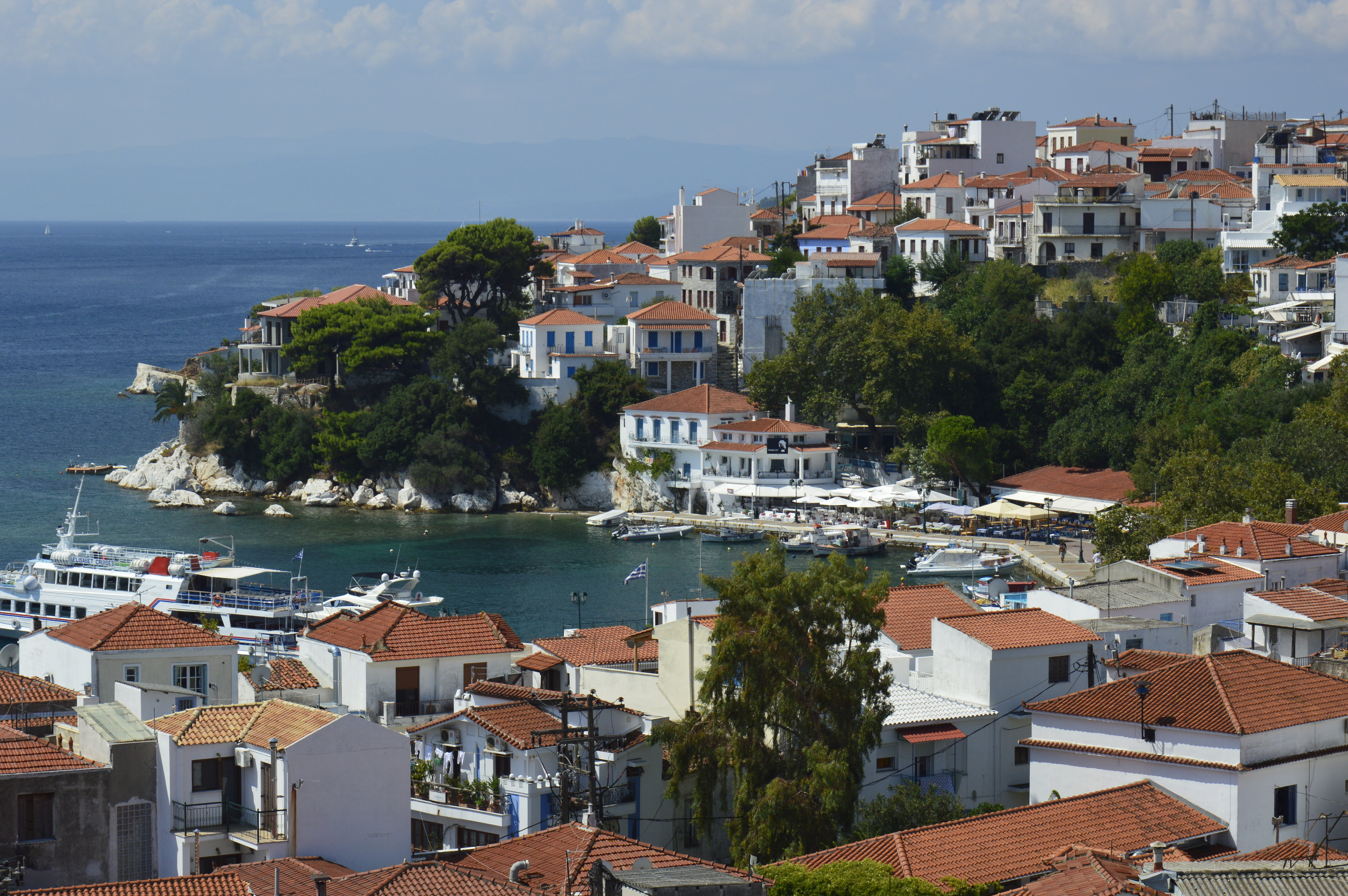
- View of the harbour of Skiathos (town)

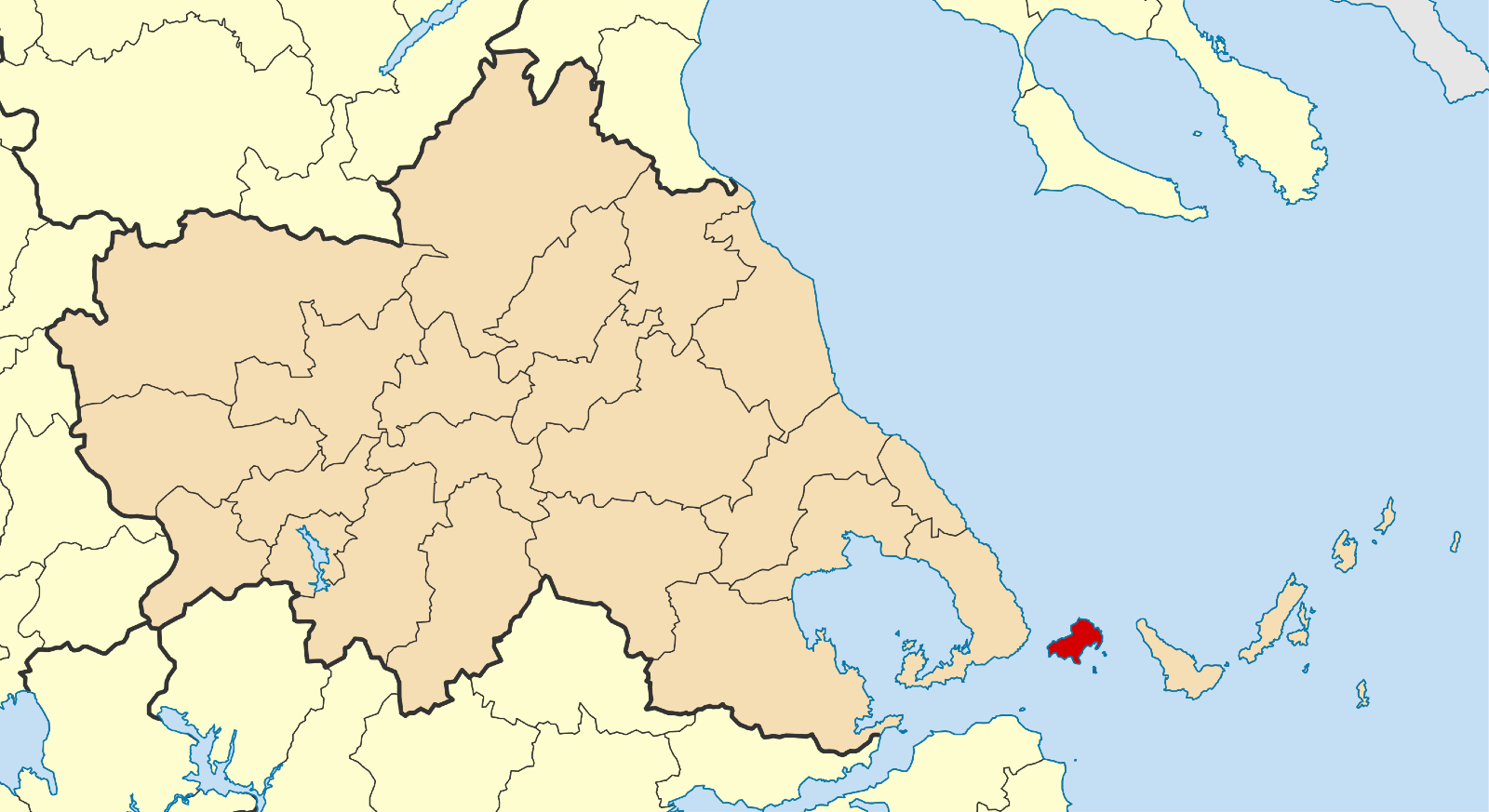

- Location within Greece
- Coordinates: 39°10′N 23°29′E
- Country: Greece
- Administrative region: Thessaly
- Regional unit: Sporades
- Seat: Skiathos

Area
  - Municipality: 49.898 km^{2} (19.266 sq mi)
- Highest elevation: 433 m (1,421 ft)
- Lowest elevation: 0 m (0 ft)

Population (2021)
  - Municipality: 5,802
  - Density: 116.3/km^{2} (301.2/sq mi)
- Time zone: UTC+2 (EET)
  - Summer (DST): UTC+3 (EEST)
- Postal code: 37002
- Area code: 24270
- Vehicle registration: BO
- Website: www.skiathos.gr

Skiathos (Greek: Σκιάθος, romanized: Skiáthos, IPA: [ˈscaθos]) is a small Greek island in the northwest Aegean Sea. Skiathos is the westernmost island in the Northern Sporades archipelago, east of the Pelion peninsula in Magnesia on the mainland, and west of the island of Skopelos.

== Geography ==
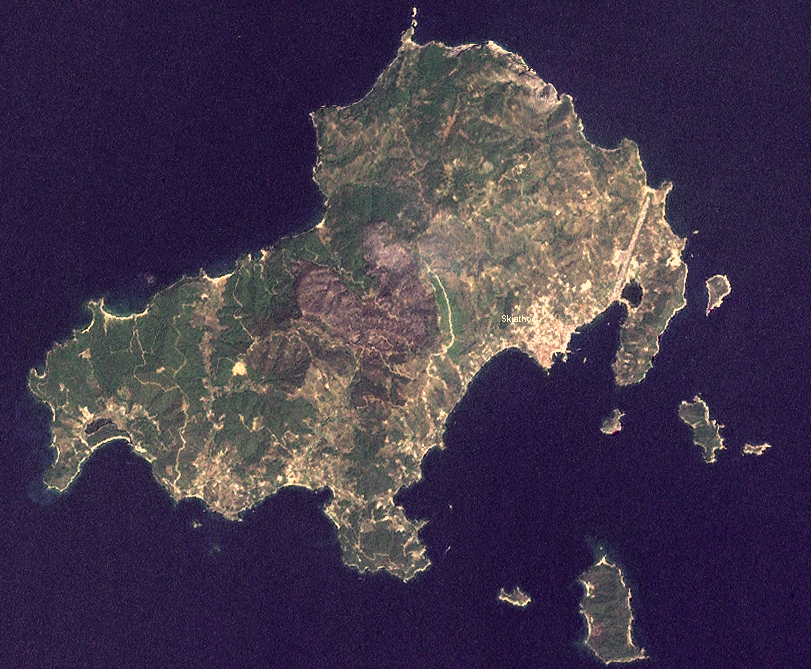
Satellite photo of Skiathos

The island has a north to southwestern axis and is about 12 kilometres (7 miles) long and 6 kilometres (4 miles) wide on average. The coastline is indented with inlets, capes and peninsulas. The southeast and southwest parts have gentler slopes and that is where most settlements and facilities are located. The terrain is more rugged on the north coast, with the highest peak at 433 m (1,421 feet) on mount Karafiltzanaka (39.1904°N 23.4685°E).

The main town is Skiathos (pop. 4,883 in 2011), in the eastern part of the island. Other main settlements are Kalyvia (312), Troullos (158), Χanemos (143), Koukounaries (119), and Achladias (118).

The Municipality of Skiathos includes the islets of Tsougria, Tsougriaki, Maragos, Arkos, Troulonisi and Aspronisi. The municipality has an area of 49.898 km^{2}. They are scattered a few kilometres off the southeast coastline and are clearly visible from the town and the beaches. The island of Skopelos is visible from Skiathos with the more distant islands of Euboea and Skyros visible under very clear weather conditions.

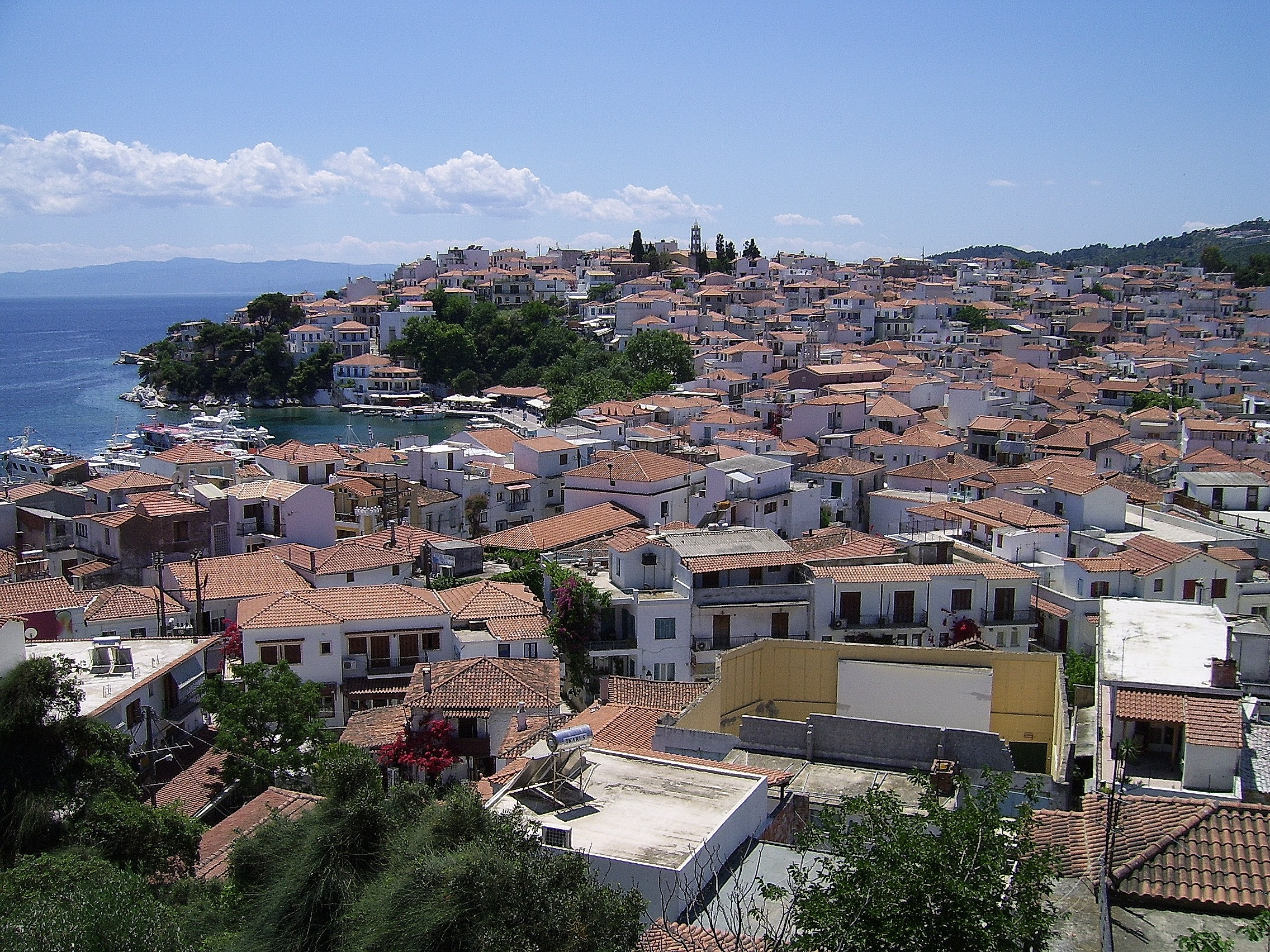
Skiathos town

The main paved road runs along the southeastern stretch of the island with several narrow dirt roads branching off towards the interior and the northern coast. Farmland exists around the major settlements on the island.

Despite its small size, Skiathos with its many beaches and wooded landscape is a popular tourist destination. It has over 60, mostly sandy, beaches scattered around the 44 km (27 mi) coastline. These include Achladies, Troulos, Vromolimnos, Koukounaries, Asselinos, Megali Ammos and Mandraki.

Much of the island is wooded with Aleppo pine and a small stone pine forest at the Koukounaries location where there is a lagoon and a popular beach. The island's forests are concentrated on the southwest and northern parts, but pine trees are prevalent throughout the island.

== History ==
In Ancient times, the island played a minor role during the Persian Wars. In 480 BC, the fleet of the Persian King Xerxes was hit by a storm and was badly damaged on the rocks off the Skiathos coast. Following this the Greek fleet blockaded the adjacent seas to prevent the Persians from invading the mainland and supplying provisions to the army facing the 300 Spartans defending the pass at Thermopylae. The Persian fleet was defeated there at Artemisium and finally destroyed at the Battle of Salamis a year later. Skiathos then became part of the Delian League. This original city was destroyed by Philip V of Macedon in 200 BC.

In 1207 the Ghisi brothers captured the island and built the Bourtzi, a small Venetian-styled fortress similar to the Bourtzi in Nafplio, on an islet just out of Skiathos Town, to protect the capital from the pirates. But the Bourtzi was ineffective in protecting the population and in the mid-14th century the inhabitants moved the capital from the ancient site that lay where modern Skiathos Town is to Kastro (the Greek word for castle), located on a high rock, overlooking a steep cliff above the sea at the northernmost part of the island. The island returned to Byzantine control in the 1270s, and remained in Byzantine hands until after the Fall of Constantinople in 1453, when it passed to the Republic of Venice. Like the rest of the Northern Sporades, Skiathos was conquered by the Ottoman admiral Hayreddin Barbarossa in 1538.

In 1704 monks from Athos built the Evangelistria Monastery, which played a part on the Greek War of Independence as a hide-out for Greek rebels. The first flag of Greece was created and hoisted in the Evangelistria Monastery in Skiathos in 1807, where several prominent military leaders (including Theodoros Kolokotronis and Andreas Miaoulis) had gathered for consultation concerning an uprising, and they were sworn to this flag by the local bishop.

After the War of Independence and demise of piracy in the Aegean, Kastro became less important. In 1830s, the island's capital was moved to the original site — where it still remains. Today, the ruins of Kastro is a tourist attraction.

During the 19th century Skiathos became an important shipbuilding centre in the Aegean due to the abundance of pine forests on the island. The pine woods of the island were then almost obliterated. This was brought to a halt though, due to the emergence of steamboats. A small shipwright remains north of Skiathos Town, which still builds traditional Greek caiques.

== Culture and intellectual life ==
Skiathos has a notable literary and artistic tradition shaped by several prominent writers, scholars, and musicians. This heritage spans from the 19th- and early 20th-century prose of Alexandros Papadiamantis and Alexandros Moraitidis, as well as the poetry of Zisis Oikonomou and the folklore studies of priest and scholar Georgios Rigas, to contemporary music. The latter is represented by composer and guitarist Adonis Mitzelos, who has roots on the island and whose work encompasses Greek rock, entechno (artistic popular music), and orchestral compositions. In 2019, Mitzelos founded the cultural institution "Skiathos of the Poets" to promote the island's literary and intellectual heritage.

In the center of Skiathos town, the Papadiamantis House Museum operates in the two-storey house where Alexandros Papadiamantis lived and died. Built around 1860 by his father, the building was designated a protected historical monument by the Hellenic Ministry of Culture in 1965 and preserves original furnishings, manuscripts, and personal belongings of the author.

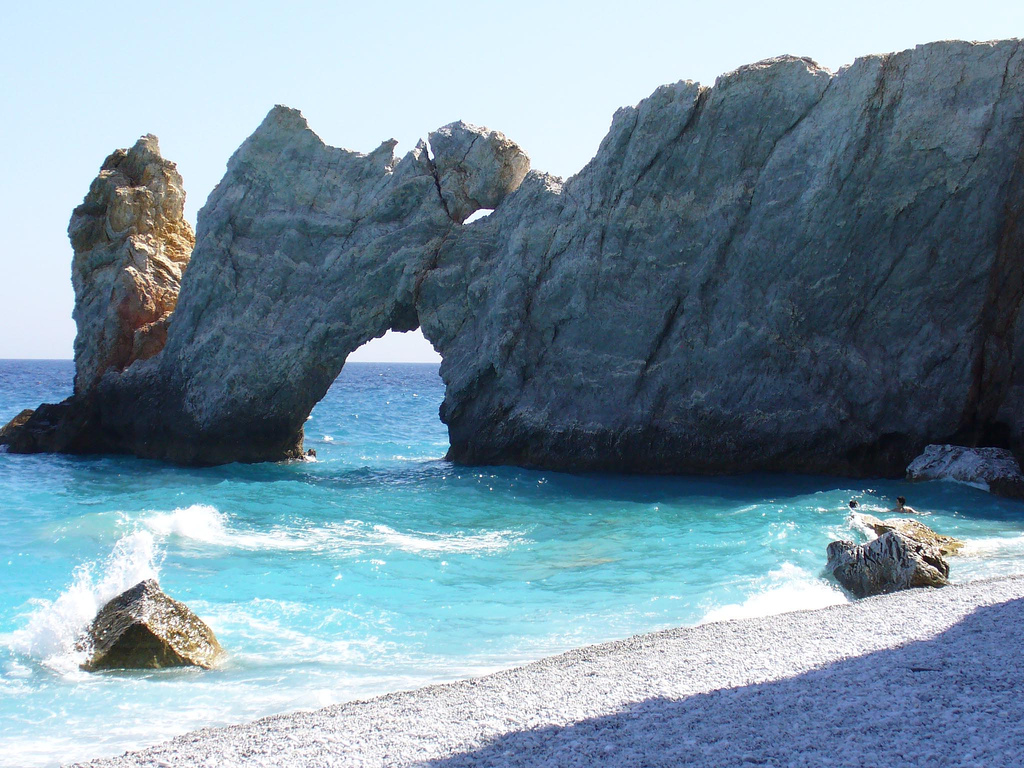
Lalaria Beach

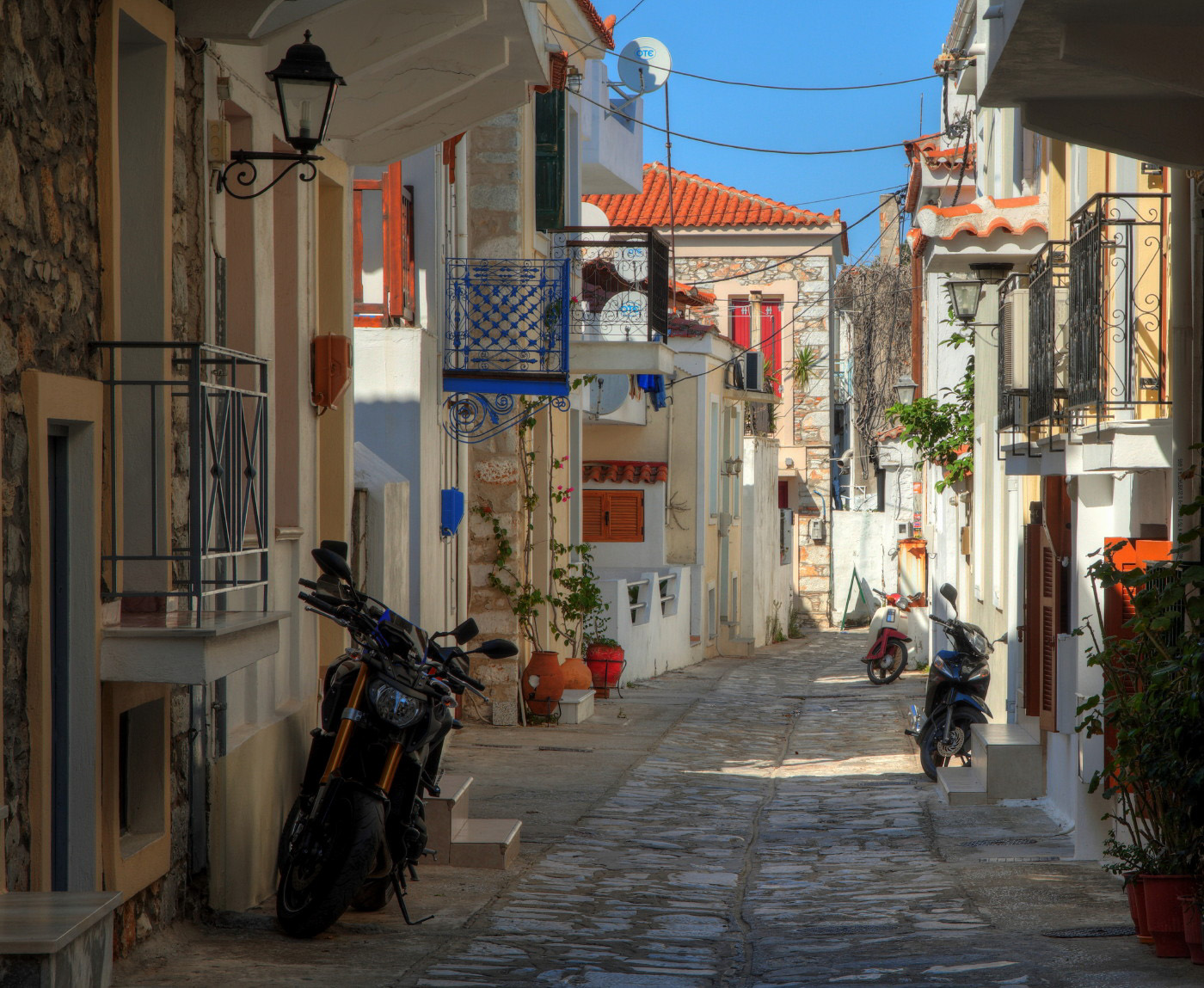
Street in Skiathos town

Houses of Skiathos

== Transport ==
There is a regular boat service to the island and the rest of the Sporades islands with departures from Volos and Agios Konstantinos. The boats are operated mainly by Hellenic Seaways using its high-speed Flying Cat vessels as well as conventional ferries.

Skiathos International Airport is at the northeast of the island next to a lagoon and a lowland isthmus separating the island from the peninsula of Lazareta. As of summer 2011, Skiathos Airport was served by Olympic Air flights from both Athens and Thessaloniki, while foreign airlines provide charter flights from a range of airports in European countries such as the United Kingdom, France, Austria, the Netherlands, Italy, Cyprus and Scandinavian countries. During the winter 2013/14, work began to expand the airport, with a runway extension and increased hard standing for parked aircraft.

The airport of Skiathos has become a destination for plane spotters and those who want to observe aircraft take off from a close distance.

The modern major road runs along the eastern and southern coast. Narrower roads, some paved and some dirt, reach the interior and the northwest coastline. There is regular, and during tourist season, very frequent bus transit from the main town to the many beaches in the southwest.

There are three bus routes on the island. The core route is from the main town to the popular golden beaches of Vassilias, Achladies, Asenlinos, and Agia Eleni. There are in total 26 bus stops, with stop 26 arriving at the popular Banana Beach. This route operates a fleet of five coaches as frequently as five times an hour during the summer peak season throughout the day, but is significantly reduced during the winter. The second route departs from Skiathos Town, to the Monastery of Evangelistria at an hourly daily schedule, and the third bus route to Xanemos on the north coast with up to six round trips daily, both operated using mini-buses.

== Sites of interest ==
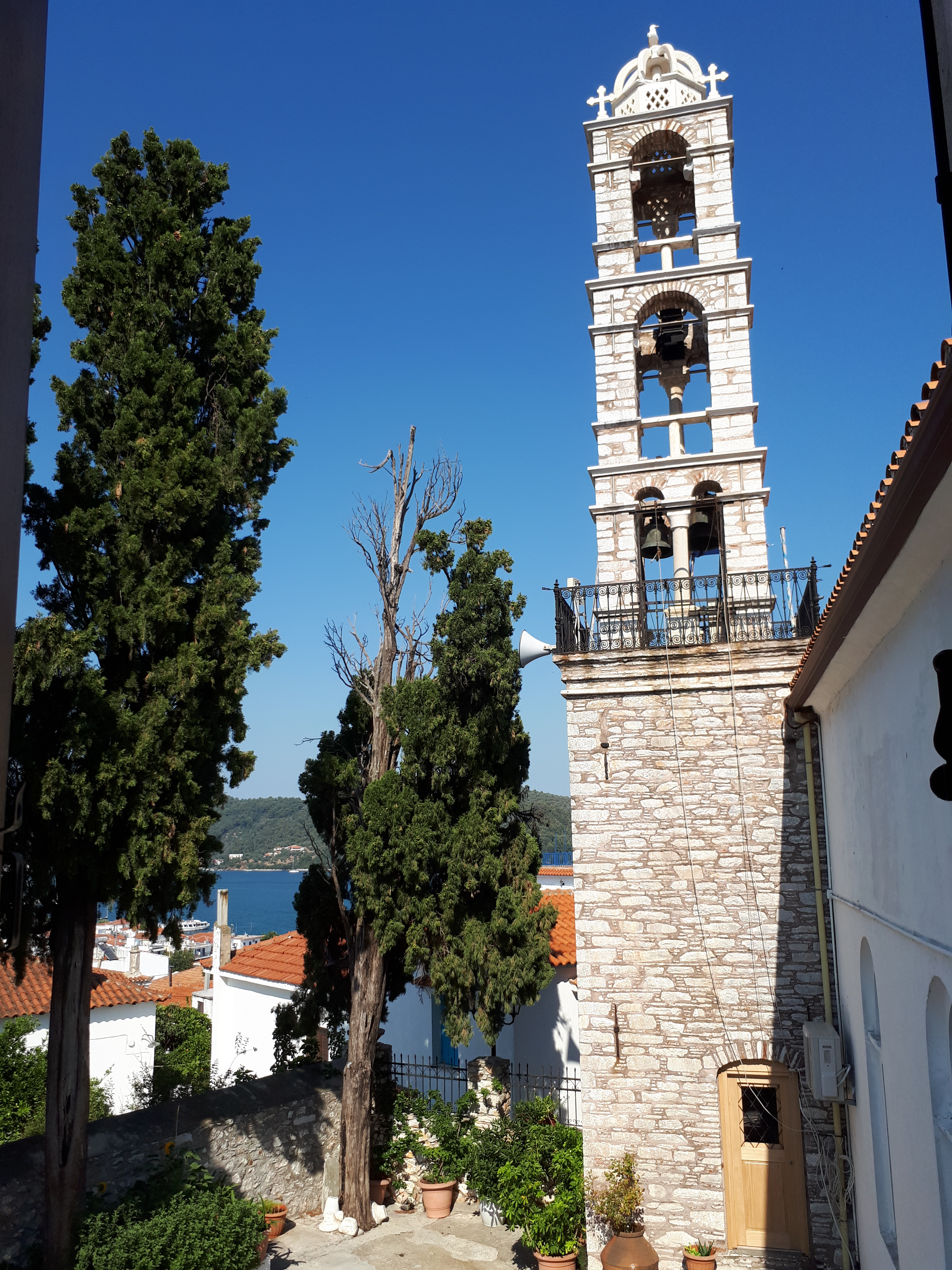
The Church of Panaghia Limniá was built in 1837 and is located in the town of Skiathos.

=== Sites of interest in the town ===
- Church of Panaghia Limnià, built in 1837
- Church of Tris Ieràrches
- Bourtzi Peninsula
- Papadiamantis House - Museum

=== Sites of interest on the island ===
- Skiathos Medieval Castle
- Holy Monastery of Evangelistria
- Old Monastery of Panaghia Ekonistria
- Old Monastery of Panaghia Kechrià
- Byzantine Church of Christ (in the Castle)

=== Beaches ===
- Koukounaries Beach
- Lalaria
- Banana beach
- Xanemos
- Megali Ammos
- Achladies
- Vromolimnos
- Agia Paraskevi
- Troulos
- Asselinos (Small and great)
- Maratha
- Mandraki
- Limani tou Xerxi
- Kechria
- Kastro
- Tsougria (island)

== In cinema ==
Skiathos and its neighbour Skopelos were the filming locations of the 2008 film Mamma Mia!.

== Notable residents ==
- Zisis Oikonomou (1911–2005), poet and prose writer
- Alexandros Papadiamantis (1851–1911), writer
- Richard Romanus (1943–2023), actor
- Mitzelos Adonis (1961), Music Composer, Writer, Orchestrator and Guitarist with International Action and Acceptance
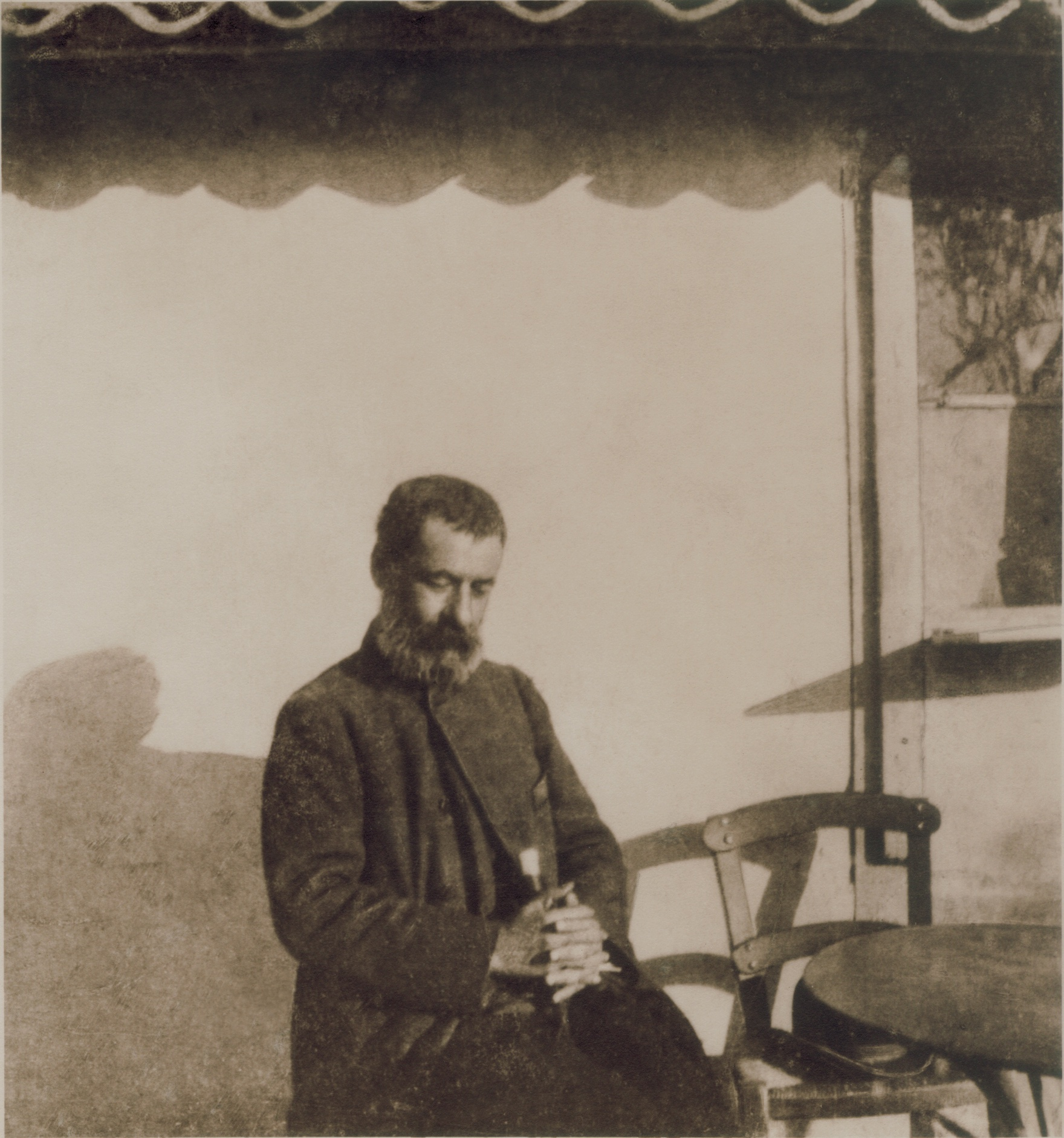
Alexandros Papadiamantis photographed by fellow Greek writer Pavlos Nirvanas, 1906

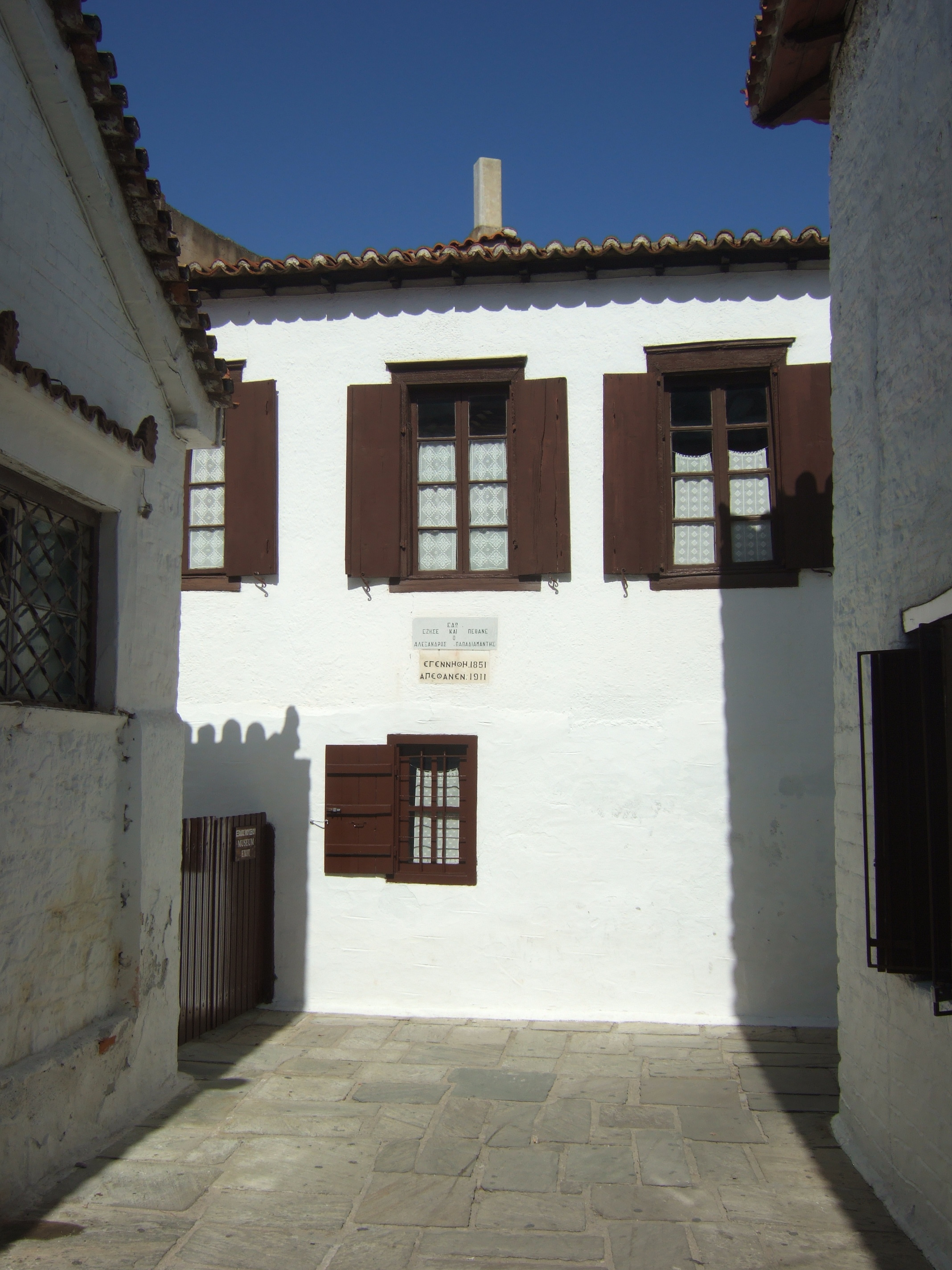
Papadiamantis house-museum

== Gallery ==
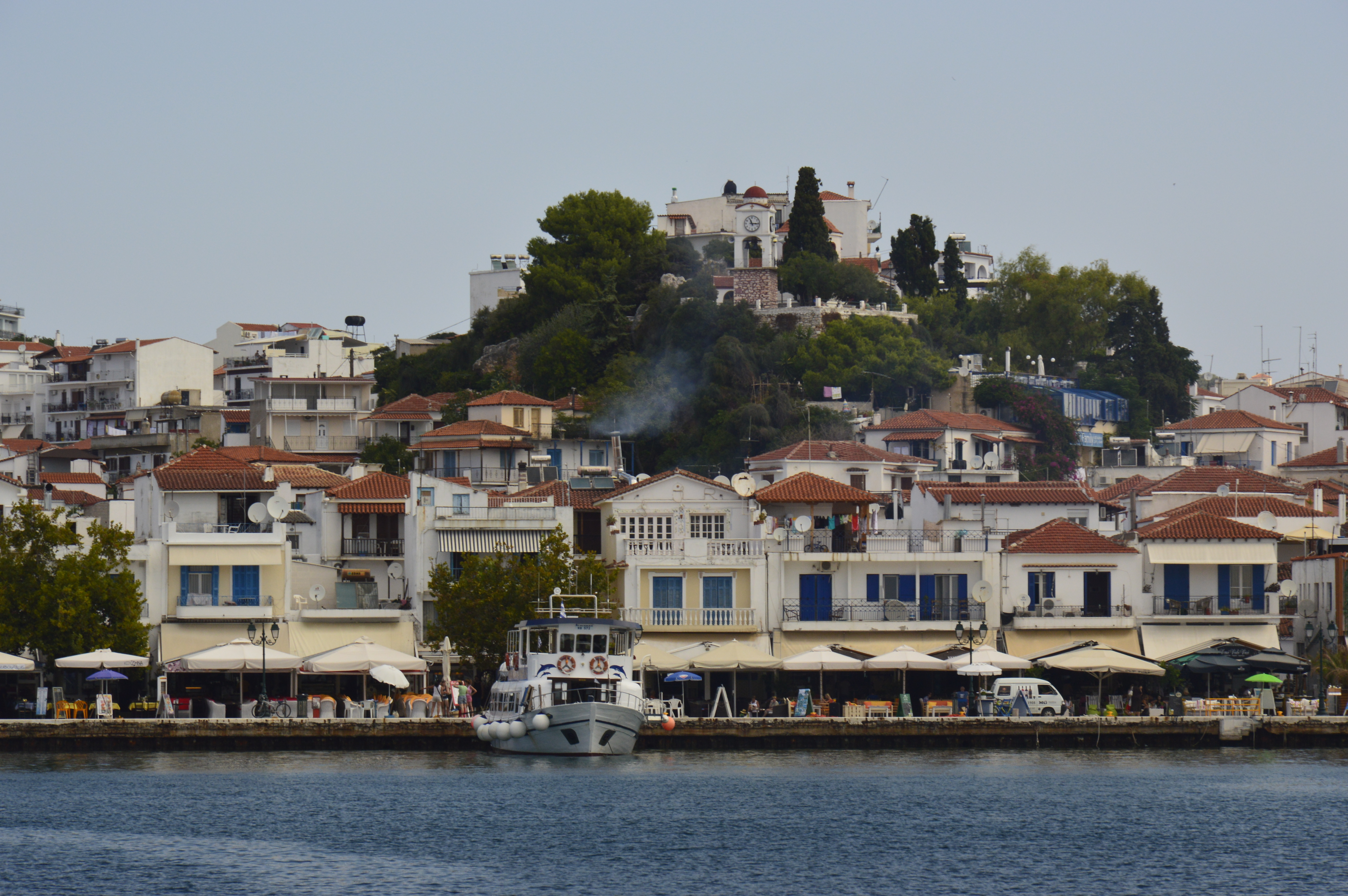
Another view of the port

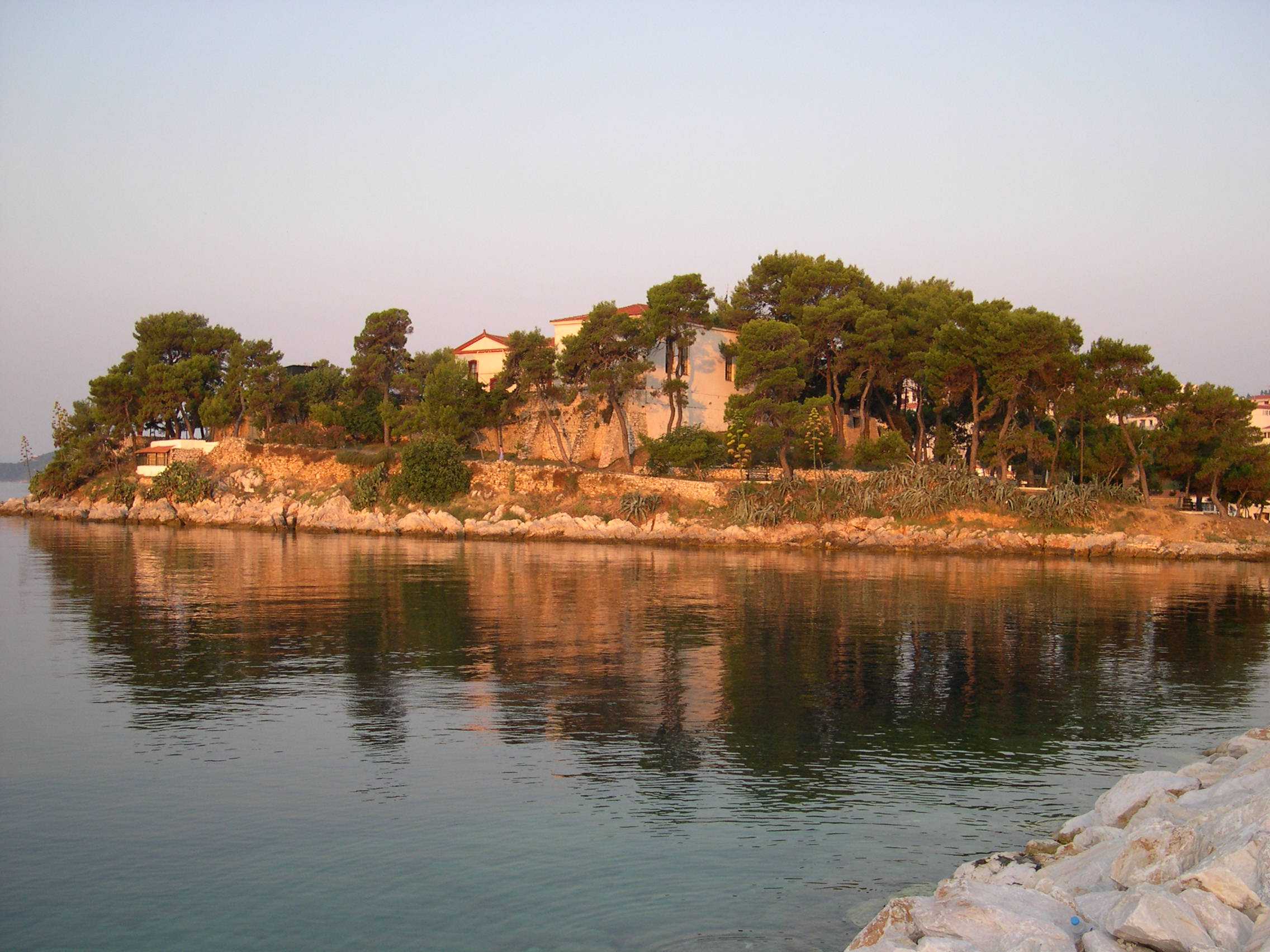
Bourtzi at Skiathos town

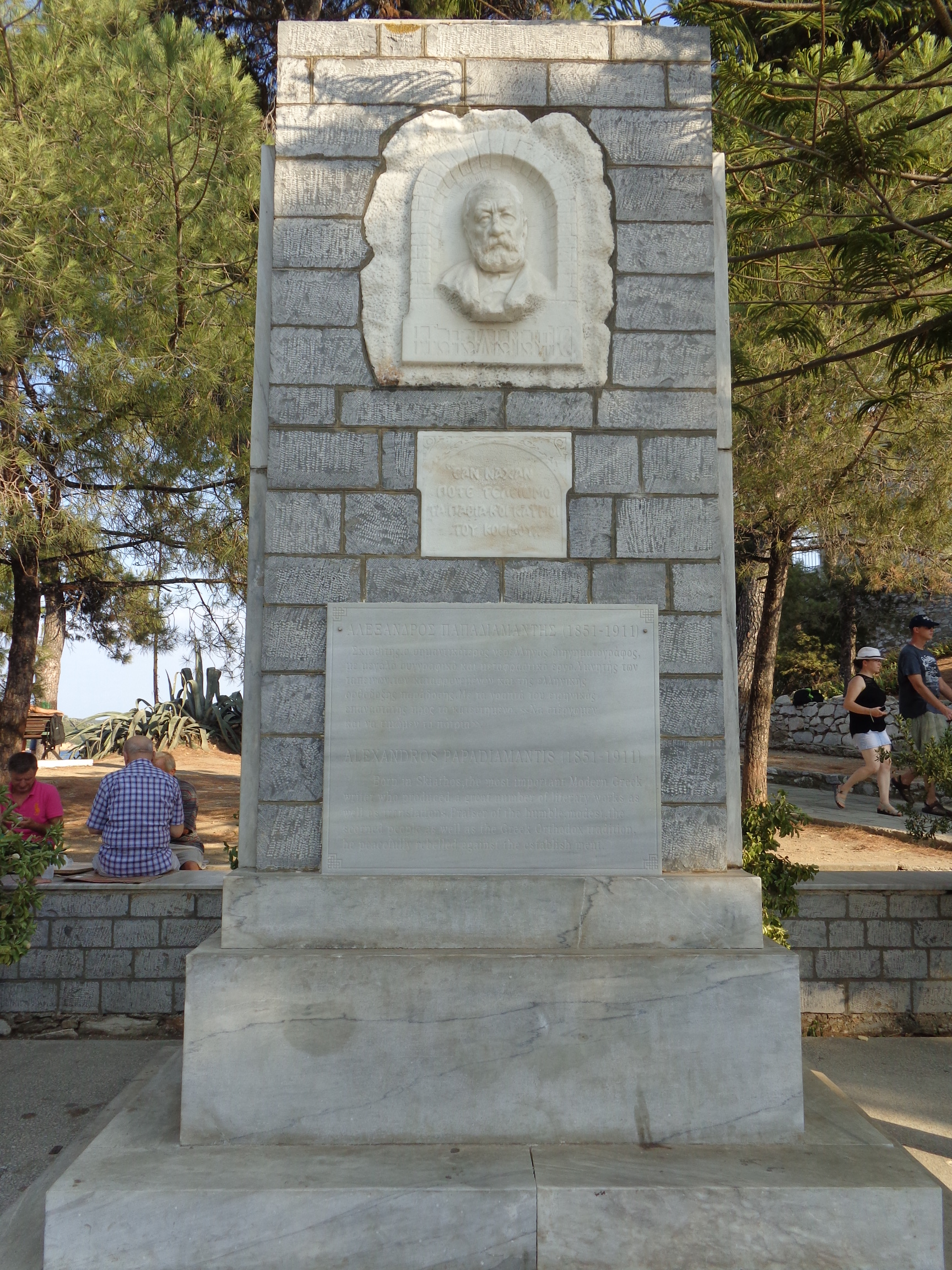
Monument of Papadiamantis

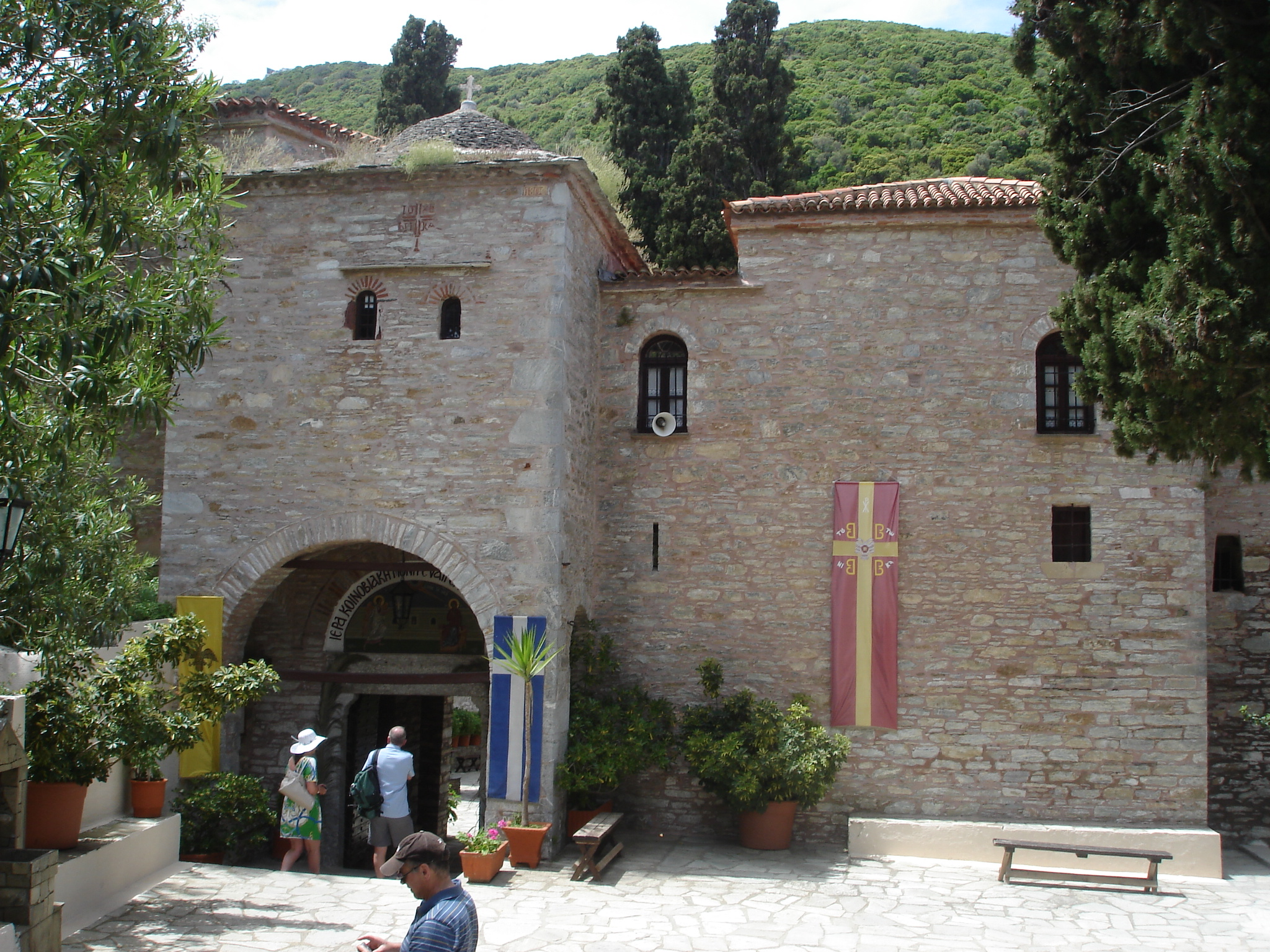
Gatehouse of Evangelistria Monastery

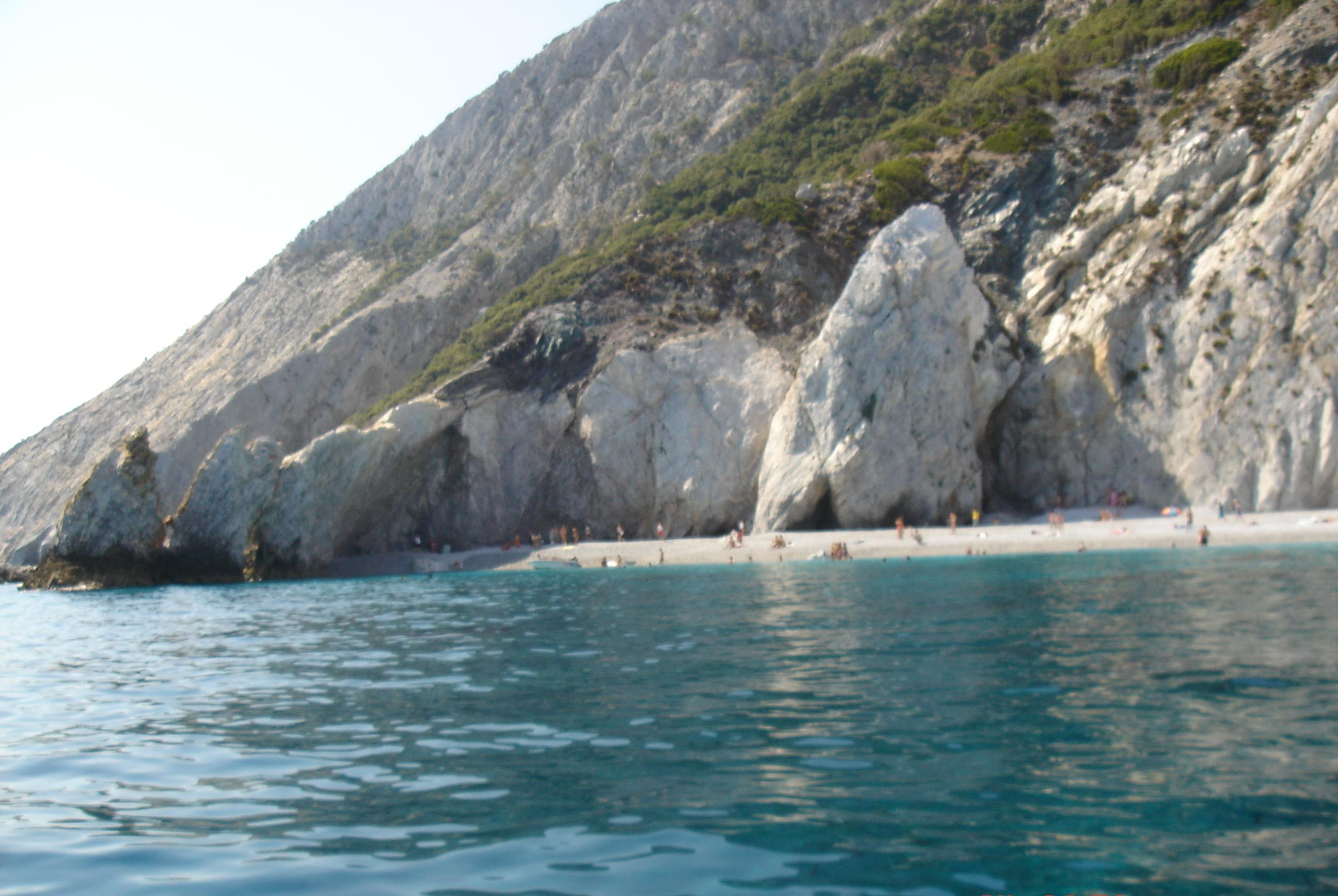
Beach in Skiathos

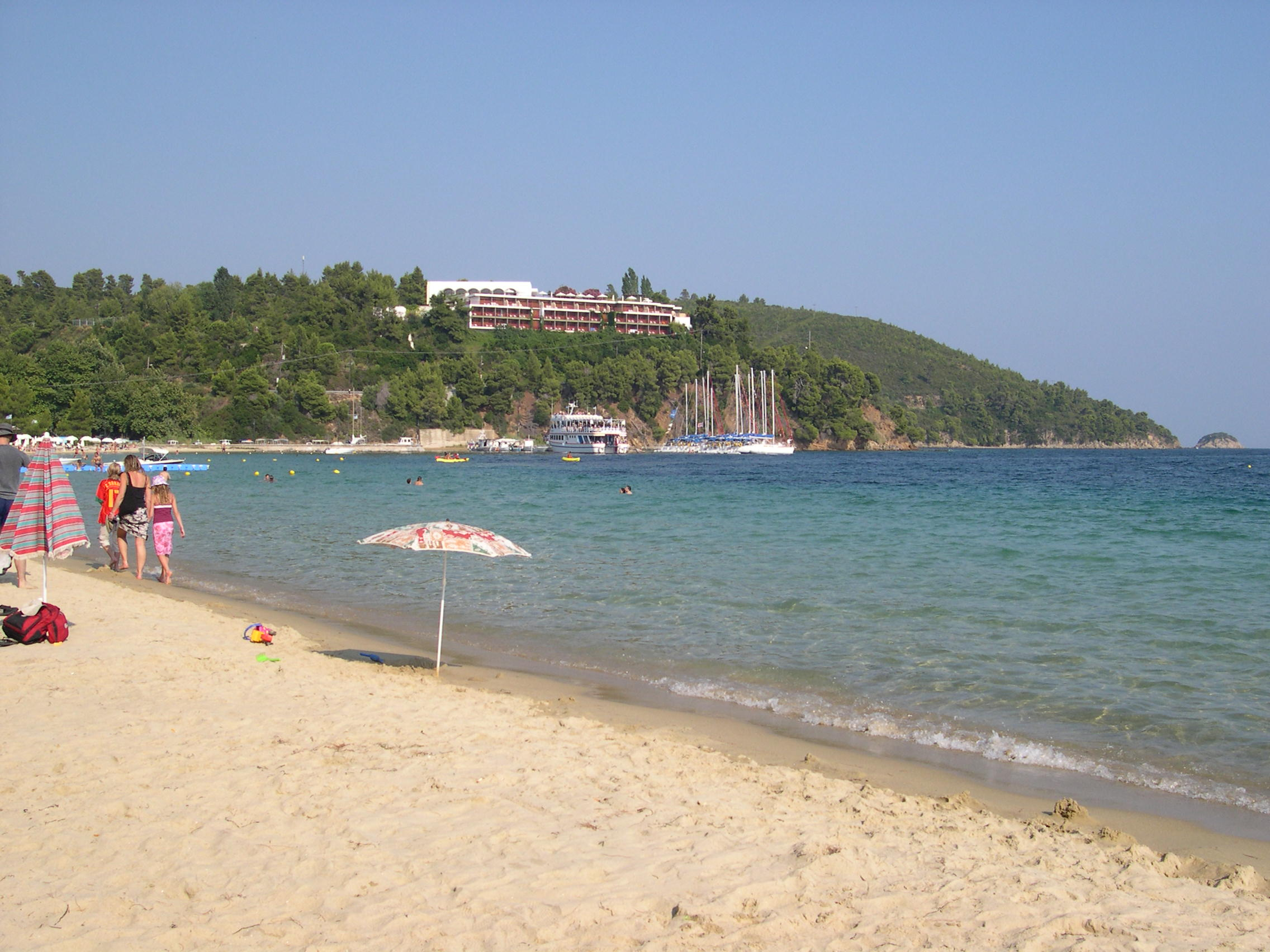
Koukounaries Beach
