= Zisis Oikonomou =

Greek poet and prose writer

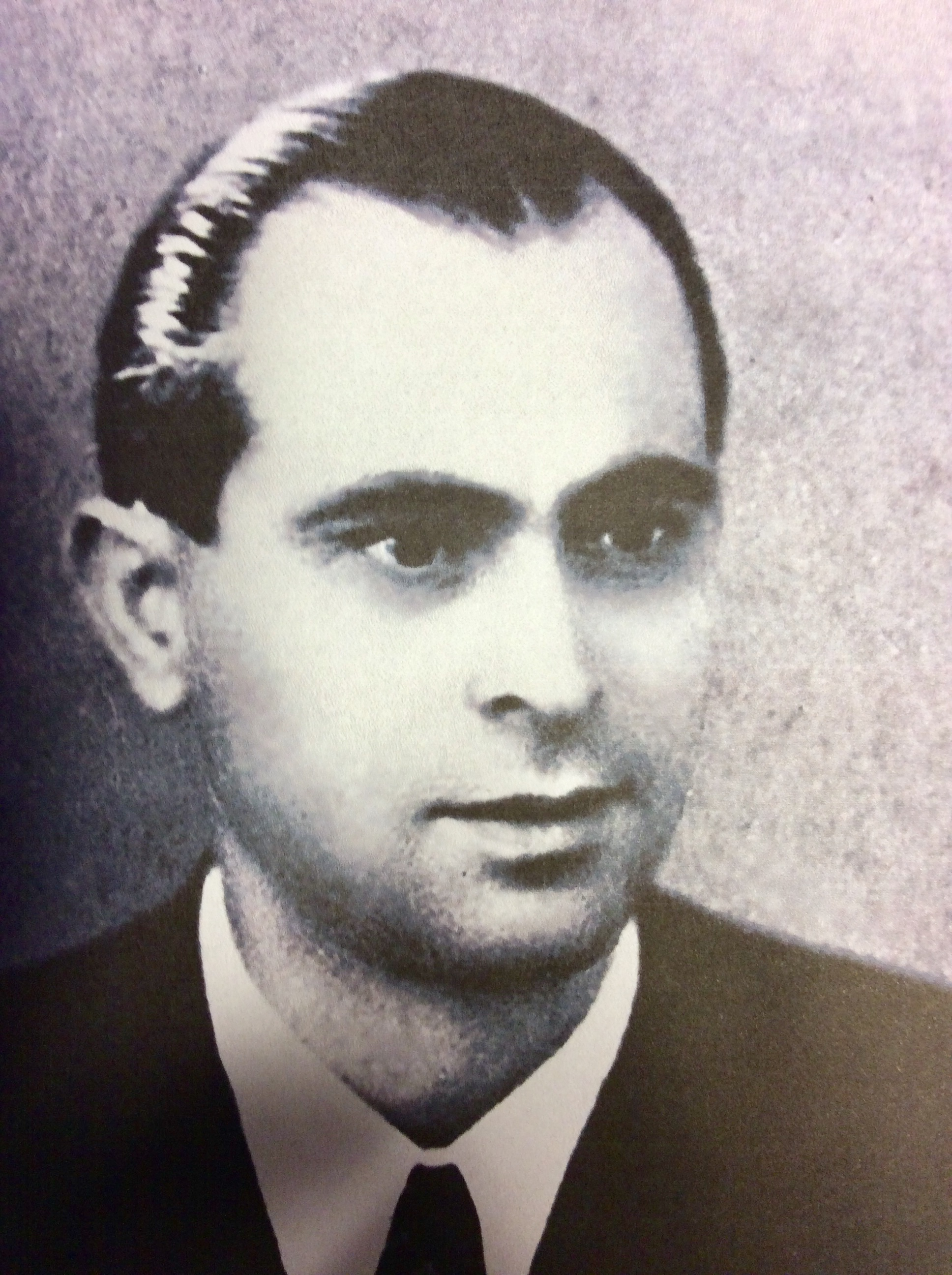
Zisis Oikonomou

Zisis Oikonomou (Greek: Ζήσης Οικονόμου ['zizis ikɔ'nɔmu]; 25 April 1911 – 3 August 2005), also spelled Zisis Economou, was a Greek poet and prose writer. In 1977 he received the poetry award from the Academy of Athens for all his work and especially for his book Cloudless Silence (Greek: "Αιθρία σιγή"). In 1995, he was honoured with the Greek National Prize of Poetry.

== Biography ==
Oikonomou was born on the Greek island of Skiathos, where he also spent his childhood years. His father was a captain and owner of a sailing ship. He died when Zisis Oikonomou was 10 years old. His mother managed to raise him and his two siblings by working on the loom and trading in carpets from Skiathos.

Zisis Oikonomou belongs to the interwar generation of Greek poets. His poetic career covers a widespread thematic and stylistic range. In the literature he first appeared in 1930 with a publication of verses in the Athenian journal Nea Genia. In 1934 his first collection of poems was published.

In the Greek-Italian War (1940/41) Oikonomou was an interpreter of Italian and German in the staff of the 3rd Army Corps. In 1941–45, during the Greek occupation, a small ship served as a residence for him and his wife Eugenia (née Deligianni). They travelled the islands of the northern Aegean Sea and the Gulf of Euboea – until they were suspected and harassed in interrogations by Italians, Germans and even by their own compatriots. His excellent language skills, his sincerity and fearlessness helped Oikonomou to escape the many dangerous situations of that time.

Oikonomou was extremely linguistically gifted. He was fluent in 10 languages and dealt with cross-cultural, cross-class and cross-political life issues. Oikonomou was passionate about travelling. He published his experiences, insights and impressions in magazines and newspapers – with his name, but also with a pseudonym.

From the mid-50s until 1976, he interrupted his publications and dealt with research on linguistics, sociology and politics. His main objective was to search for a unified worldview that draws elements from all areas of science and knowledge. Starting from the optimistic worldview of futurism and surrealism and praising modern technologies, he quickly entered into the phase of retreat and reservation against western rationalism and turned towards an individualistic worldview, influenced by the study of Eastern religions (mainly of Buddhism) and philosophers like Schopenhauer, Berdyaev and Keyserling. This search also affected his poetry, whose language became increasingly simple and effective. Oikonomou also dealt with the theatre and wrote several pieces.

During his time in Athens many acquaintances and good friendships developed. Among his intellectual and literary friends in Athens were Dimis Apostolopoulos, Sarantaris, Varikas, Ritsos and Kazantzakis.

Oikonomou always remained an impartial researcher. His non-conformist, free thinking and acting often aroused the resistance of his compatriots and literary colleagues.

In his old age Oikonomou returned to his home island Skiathos.

== Works ==
The literary work of Zisi Oikonomou comprises the areas of poetry, diaries, essays, studies and theatre.

=== Poetry ===
- Η εποποιία των αγενών μετάλλων. 1934.
- Ο κόσμος στη δύση του. 1935.
- Ανάρρωση. 1935.
- Τοπία. 1936.
- Η προσευχή της γης. Athens 1938.
- Ωκεάνεια. Govostis, Athens 1939.
- Η συνοδεία του ανέμου. Govostiv, Athens 1945.
- Στο σταυροδρόμι του χρόνου· Ποιήματα. Govostis, Athens 1946.
- Προς τον καθαρό εαυτό. 1953.
- Αιθρία σιγή. Kedros, Athens 1976.
- Ποιήματα 1934–1953. Kedros, Athens 1977.
- Και επί γης ειρήνη. Kedros, Athens 1984.
- Μαύρο χιούμορ γιαυτά που μας συμβαίνουν. 1988.

=== Diaries ===
- Το ημερολόγιο ενός ζώου. Govostis, Athens 1938.
- Το ημερολόγιο της ερημιάς και της σιωπής. Polytypo, Athens 1989.

=== Essays ===
- Η διαμονή εκείνου που έφυγε. 1938.
- Περ’ απ’ τον παράδεισο της κοινότητας. Govostis, Athens 1939.
- Η ομολογία της ταπείνωσης. Govostis, Athens 1944.
- Πολιτική και πνεύμα. Govostis, Athens 1944.
- Σκέψεις για τη μουσική και για την ποίηση. 1946.
- Μοίρα και λόγος. Govostis, Athens 1948.
- Μηδενισμός και ψυχική επανάσταση. 1978.
- Πολιτισμός θανάτου και ζωτική εγρήγορση. 1982.
- Η γυναίκα της ανδροκρατίας και οι κοινωνίες των υπερκαταναλώσεων. Polytypo, Athens 19xx.
- Χρονικό της Νέας Ευταξίας για τη Νέα Εποχή (άλλα σατιρικά και άλλα). Polytypo, Athens 1994.

=== Studies ===
- Ο Παπαδιαμάντης και το νησί του (μικρογραφία της ανθρωπότητας). Athens 1979.

=== Theater ===
- Το κάτω πάτωμα· Drama in three acts and five pictures. Govostis, Athens 1947.
- Νεκρή ζώνη. 1947.
- Ώρα να πιείτε το τσάι σας· Drama in three acts. Govostis, Athens 1947.
- Το στοιχειωμένο σπίτι· Drama. Govostis, Athens 1948.
- Η επιστροφή του ασώτου· Drama in two acts and three scenes. Govostis, Athens 1948.
- Το μακρινό ταξίδι και δύο άλλα μονόπρακτα. Govostis, Athens 1949.

== Translated works ==
=== In English ===
- Kimon Friar: Modern Greek Poetry, Efstathiadis Group, Athens 1982, p. 248-252 (4 poems).

=== In German ===
- Zisis Oikonomou: Heitere Stille, Gedichte, Zweisprachig: Griechisch-Deutsch, Übersetzung: Leo Mergel, O.L. Mergel, Eutingen 2018, ISBN 978-3-7450-7307-2 (67 poems).

== Awards ==
- In 1977 Zisis Oikonomou received the Poetry Award from the Academy of Athens for all his work and especially for his book "Cloudless Silence" (Greek "Αιθρία σιγή").
- In 1995 he was honoured with the Greek National Prize of Poetry for his book “Chronicle of the New Order for the New Age” (Greek: "Χρονικό της Νέας Ευταξίας για τη Νέα Εποχή") and the entirety of his works.

== Literature ==
Selection (in Greek):

- Alexandros Argyriou: "Zisis Economou", The Greek poetry – Neoteric poets of Interwar period. Sokolis, Athens 1979, page 138–142 (of introduction) and 98–99.
- Alexis Ziras: "Economou Zisis", World Biography, Dictionary 7. Ekdotiki Athinon, Athens 1987.
- Michalis M. Miraklis, Georgia Theofani: "Economou Zisis", Encyclopaedia of Modern Greek Literature, Pataki, Athens 2007.

== Zisis Oikonomou Museum ==
In his will, Zisis Oikonomou bequeathed the house where he was born to the Skiathos Municipality for cultural use. After restoration funded by regional and local resources, the municipality transformed the house into a museum, showcasing Zisis Oikonomou's rich intellectual legacy through personal items and memorabilia. Visitors gain insight into the poet's life and work through images, text, and audio. All information is available in nine languages (Greek, English, German, French, Italian, Russian, Swedish, Norwegian, Danish) and can be accessed via QR code on visitors' mobile devices. Additionally, there is an option for a virtual tour of the museum on the internet ().
