= Papadiamantis House Museum =

Museum in Skiathos, Greece

Coordinates: 39°09′47″N 23°29′24″E

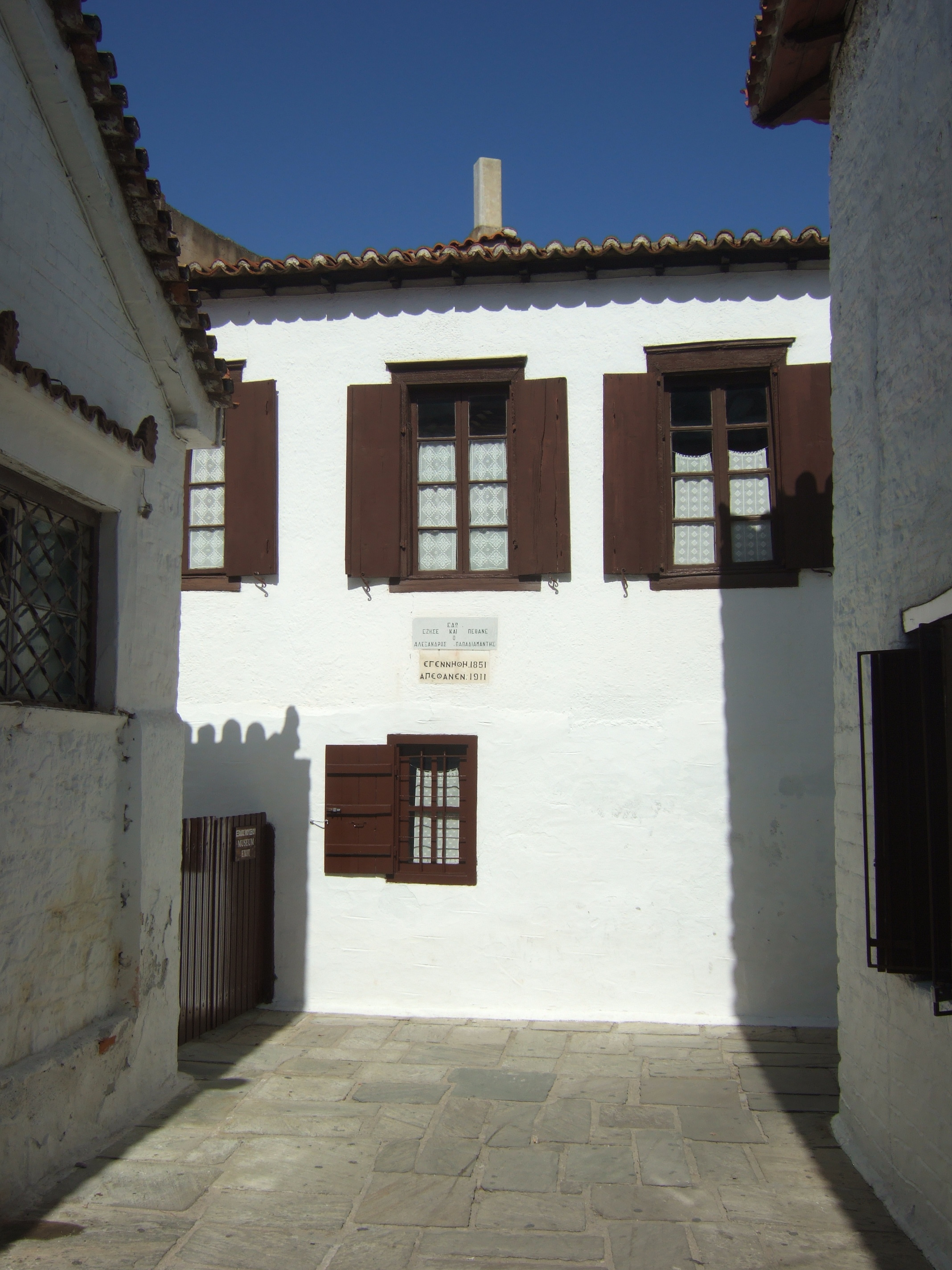
View of the house

Papadiamantis House Museum is a museum in Skiathos in the Sporades, Greece, dedicated to the Greek writer Alexandros Papadiamantis (1851–1911). Following his death, his house was transformed into a modern museum with displays related to his life and attracts many visitors.

Papadiamantis was actually born in a previous house on the site but grew up in the present two-story house which his father built in 1860. At the left side of the entrance is the living room with the fireplace and original furniture (including his bed and the long narrow divan), where Papadiamantis spent the last moments of his life in the winter of 1911 and at the right a small room where the author's father, who was a priest, kept his books and religious vestments. Other rooms used by the family for storage house a display dedicated to the author's life and work.
