= Koukounaries =

Koukounaries Κουκουναριές
- Settlement
- Location within Greece
- Coordinates: 39°9′N 23°24′E
- Country: Greece
- Administrative region: Thessaly
- Regional unit: Sporades
- Municipality: Skiathos

Population (2021)
  - Total: 44
- Time zone: UTC+2 (EET)
  - Summer (DST): UTC+3 (EEST)
- Vehicle registration: ΒΟ

Koukounaries (Greek: Κουκουναριές, pronounced [kukunaˈrʝes]l "stone pines") is a location and a beach in the southwest part of the Skiathos island in Greece. It is 16 km southwest of the main town on the island. Skiathos is part of the Sporades group of islands in the Northern Aegean Sea.

At Koukounaries there is a lagoon and a wooded peninsula with a stone pine (Pinus pinea) forest separating the lagoon from the Aegean Sea. On the seaward side of the peninsula there is a popular beach called Koukounaries or Chrysi Ammos (Greek: Χρυσή Άμμος, meaning 'golden sand').

Koukounaries was once known as Maratha (Μάραθα). Until 1964, when Skiathos was designated by the Greek National Tourism Organisation as a special development zone for tourism, the Town of Skiathos was the only settlement on the island. Following the GNTO's zoning, a paved road along the coast connected the Town of Skiathos to Koukounaries. Around the same time, the first large scale resort development on the island was built in Koukounaries. Koukounaries is the last stop of the bus route from Skiathos Town.

Currently, Koukounaries is a popular tourist destination during summer with numerous hotels, hostels, camping sites, tavernas, restaurants, bars, "ouzeri", and cafes.

== Population ==
Year	Population
2001	126
2011	119
2021	44

== Gallery ==
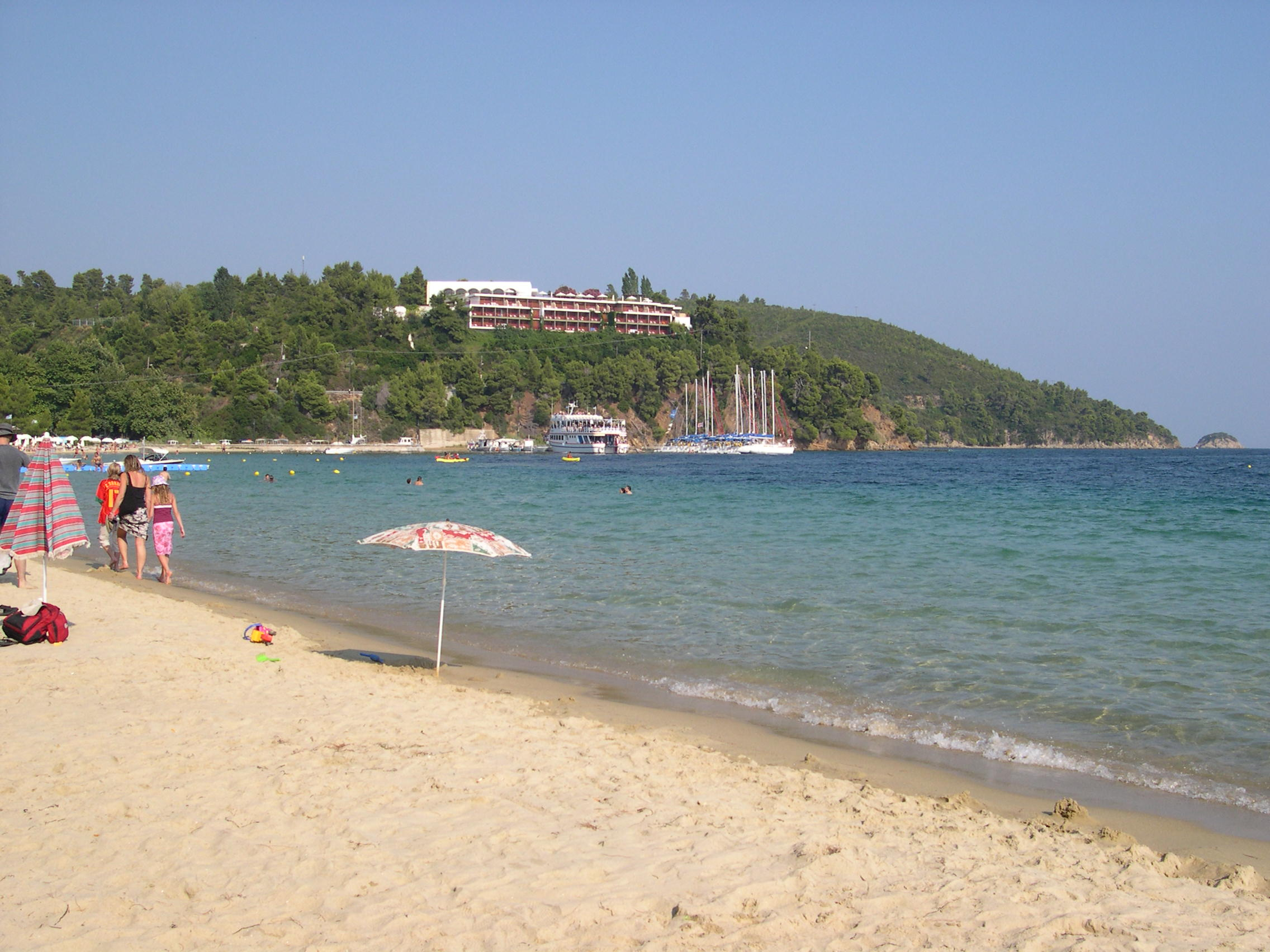
Koukounaries beach, July 2005

Koukounaries beach, October 2008
