= List of Greek horse breeds =

This is a list of the horse breeds usually considered to be of Greek origin. Some may have complex or obscure histories, so inclusion here does not necessarily imply that a breed is predominantly or exclusively from Greece.

| English name | Name in Greek | Notes | Image |
|---|---|---|---|
| Andravida | | | |
| Arravani | | | |
| Messara (Cretan) | Μεσσαρίτικο άλογο, Messarítiko álogo | endangered-maintained | |
| Peneia Pony | αλογάκι της Πηνείας, alogáki tis Pineías | endangered-maintained | |
| Pindos Pony | αλογο της Πίνδου, alogo tis Píndou | endangered-maintained | |
| Skyros Pony | αλογάκι της Σκύρου, alogáki tis Skýrou | critical-maintained | |
| Thessalian Pony | | | |
