= Horses in Greece =

Equine culture in Greece

Horses have had a significant place in the history and culture of Greece since ancient times. They appear frequently in the literature, art and mythology of the Mycenaean and later civilisations of Ancient Greece.

As in other European countries, the number of horses in the country fell sharply in the twentieth century with the advent of motor transport. In the twenty-first century there are six recognised horse breeds and several feral populations of various sizes.

== History ==
The earliest archaeological remains of horses found in mainland Greece are bones dating from the Middle Bronze Age, no earlier than 1800 BC.

=== Ancient Greece ===
The first known pictorial depictions of horses in Ancient Greece are in Mycenaean shaft graves dating from about 1650–1550 BC, where artefacts also document the use of the chariot.

The equestrian culture of ancient Greece is documented in two treatises on horsemanship from about 350 BC by the Athenian historian and soldier Xenophon: the Hipparchicus (Ἱππαρχικός, Hipparchikós), which deals mainly with the duties of the cavalry commander; and Περὶ ἱππικῆς, Perì hippikēs – often translated as On Horsemanship – which deals with the selection, care and training of horses in general. These were considered the earliest extant works on horsemanship in any literature until the publication in 1931 of the work of Kikkuli of the Mitanni Kingdom, which dates from about 1360 BC. An earlier treatise by Simon of Athens – twice mentioned by Xenophon – was believed lost, but some fragments survive and were published in 1912.

Horses were used for human transport, either as riding animals or harnessed to a chariot; for heavy transport, donkeys, oxen and mules were used. The saddle and the stirrup were unknown in ancient Greece, but the spur and a simple bridle were used. The horse was associated with the wealth, prestige and nobility of its owner, as in texts such as the Iliad, where King Nestor equates captured horses with precious booty.

=== Modern Greece ===
In the twentieth century, the Greek horse population declined sharply. In 2011 it stood at about 30000; most Greek horse breeds were at risk of extinction.

== Breeds and types ==
Six breeds of horse are officially recognised in Greece: the Andravida, the Messara or Cretan, the Peneia Pony, the Pindos Pony, the Skyros Pony and the Thessalian Pony; the Aravani of western Macedonia is not recognised in its home country, but is reported to DAD-IS by Germany, where there is a breed society and a stud-book.

There are also a number of feral populations, deriving from horses abandoned or escaped for reasons such as the depopulation of the countryside, the mechanisation of agriculture or the Greek Civil War of 1946–1949. Among these are: a group of about 40 bay horses in the delta of the Achelous River in Epirus; a small number of horses of Pindos type on Mount Ainos, on the Ionian island of Cephalonia; a herd of some hundreds in the area of Amvrakikos in Epirus; about 90 head in the delta of the Axios River close to Thessaloniki, and on a nearby island; a herd of about 400 on Pagaio Mountain, near Drama in East Macedonia and Thrace, in north-eastern Greece; a group of about 30 in the delta of the Kalamas River, near Igoumenitsa in Thesprotia, Epirus; about 200 on the island of Petalas in the Echinades; approximately 1000 horses in the southern Rhodope Mountains in the north of the country; and a population of about 200 on Menoikio, in Serres.
