= Trochadi =

Leather sandal

The trochadi (τροχάδι) is a type of leather sandal that is produced in Skyros, Greece.

The roots of the trochadi are claimed to be from Ancient Greece. The name comes from the Greek verb "τρέχω", which means to run. It is the responsibility of the father to make trochadia for his sons (in the past the trochadi was exclusively worn by men).

== Sources ==
- Ιστορικό Μουσείο, Λαογραφική συλλογή: ένα τροχάδι παραδοσιακό και ένα με λάστιχο, νεώτερα. (Υπεύθυνη: Βιδάλη Αγγέλα, Επιμελήτρια Λαογραφικής Συλλογής)
- Μουσείο Υποδημάτων, Μ. Αλεξάνδρου 47, Καστανιά Καρδίτσας (Υπεύθυνος: Παύλος Κόγιας)
- Λάμπρου, Α. 1994, Οι σκυριανές φορεσιές, Ναύπλιο, Πελοποννησιακό Λαογραφικό Ίδρυμα. (Εξαντλημένο)
- Μιχαήλ Κωνσταντινίδου, 1901,Η νήσος Σκύρος από των αρχαιοτάτων χρόνων μέχρι των καθ’ημάς, Ιστορικό δοκίμιο, Αθήνα, Τυπογραφείο Δ. Γ. Ευστρατίου - Σε ηλεκτρονική μορφή:Online resource
- Δημητρίου Παπαγεωργίου, 1909, Ιστορία της Σκύρου από των αρχαιοτάτων χρόνων, Πάτρα, Τυπογραφείο Ανδρ. Β. Πασχά - Σε ηλεκτρονική μορφή: Online resource
- Αγγελικής Χατζημιχάλη, 1925, Ελληνική Λαϊκή Τέχνη – Σκύρος, Αθήνα, ΤΥΠΟΙΣ Α.Ε.Β.Ε. Π.Γ. Μακρής και Σια
- Κουκουλές Φαίδων, 1951, Βυζαντινών Βίος και Πολιτισμός, Τέταρτος Τόμος, Εκδόσεις Παπαζήση
