= Valaxa =

Greek island in the Sporades

Native name: Βάλαξα
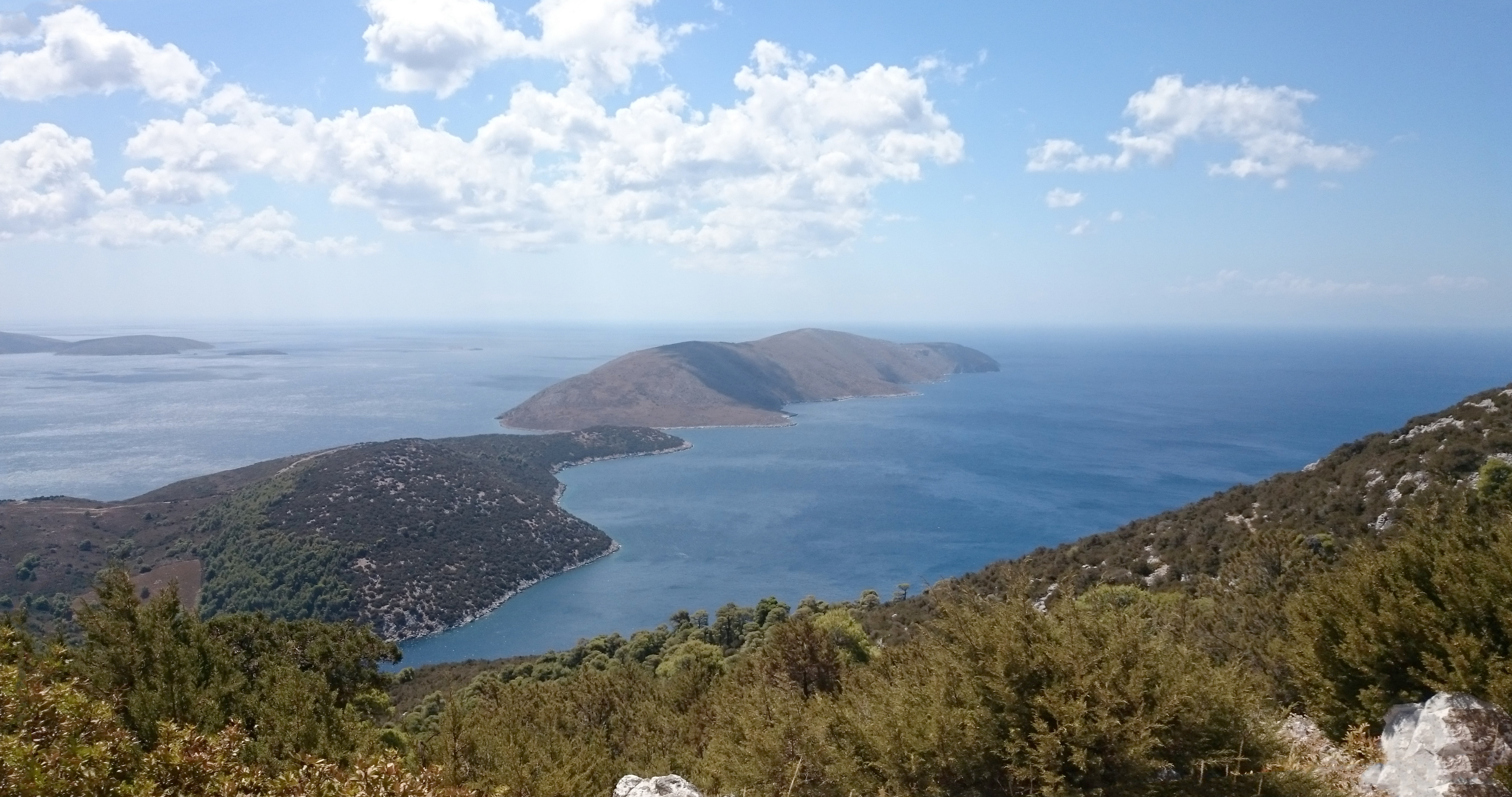
- A view of the island of Valaxa.

- Location within Greece

Geography
- Coordinates: 38.82°N 24.49°E
- Archipelago: Sporades
- Area: 4.34 km^{2} (1.68 sq mi)
- Highest elevation: 100 m (300 ft)

Administration
- Greece
- Region: Central Greece
- Regional unit: Euboea
- Municipality: Skyros

Demographics
- Population: 0 (2001)

Valaxa (Greek: Βάλαξα) is a Greek island in the Sporades archipelago. It is located southwest of the island of Skyros, of which it is administratively a part. Valaxa's southernmost point, Latomeio Point, has a flashing light as a guide. Lighthouse

== Nearest Islands and Islets ==
Its nearest islands and islets are Erinia to the west and Skyros to the north and east.
