= Axios horse =

Greek horse breed

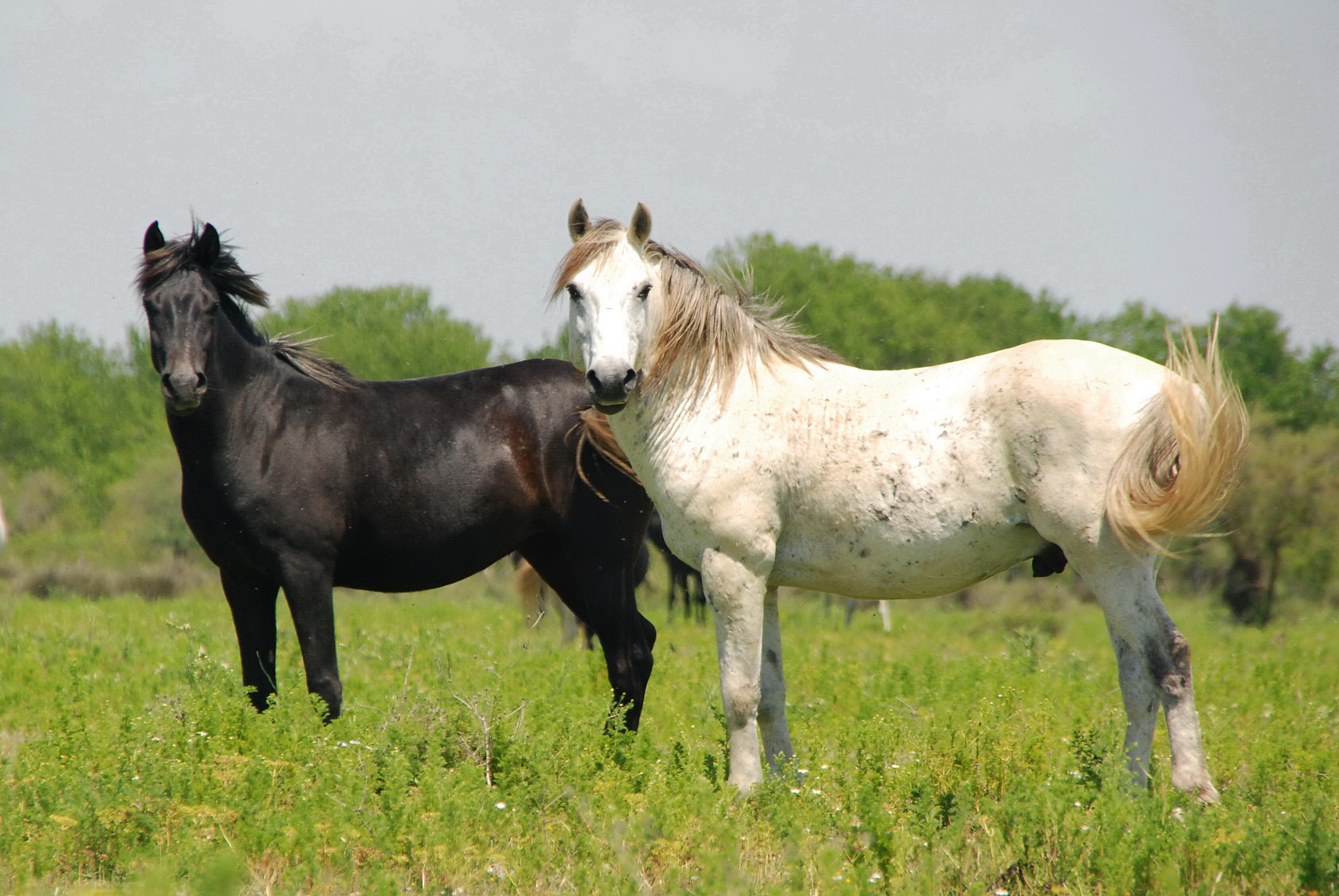
- Axios horses in the delta vegetation
- Country of origin: Greece
- Use: Feral horse

Traits
- Color: Gray, bay, seal brown, black, chestnut, roan

The Axios is a breed of feral horses native to the Axios delta in Greek Macedonia, northern Greece. These robust, medium-sized animals, closely related to the Pindos and Thessalian breeds, originate from work horses released by local Greek farmers in the 1960s and 1970s. The rich wetland formed by the delta provides them with a favorable biotope, enabling them to survive as wild herds in the national park that has since been created. In 2010, there were less than a hundred individuals, which places the Axios among the critically endangered equine populations. These water-going horses are now a major attraction for tourists to Greece. However, the breed faces a number of threats, including competition for food from cattle and the capture of mares by farmers, and its long-term survival is not assured.

== History ==
According to John Menegatos, professor of agriculture at the University of Athens, the Balkan pony, ancestor of today's Greek ponies, can be divided into two types: mountain and lowland. Specific to the Axios delta, the Axios belongs to the second group.

These animals are the offspring of agricultural workhorses, abandoned by their owners in the late 1960s and early 1970s, due to the mechanization of this activity. The horses are released into the Axios delta, a wetland where they find an abundant source of food, and where they reproduce. However, their presence is sometimes a nuisance for local farmers, as they leave their biotope during periods of flooding, and seek out sources of food in the surrounding crops, which they damage. In 1997, an official count revealed around 80 horses.

In 2008, people in charge of the Axios, Loudias, Aliakmonas National Park carried out a study to characterize this equine population. They counted five groups and a few isolated horses, all in good physical condition. A project funded by the European Union from 2007-2013 will provide shelter for these horses and an observation post for ecotourism. From 2008 to 2012, however, according to Amaltheia, the Greek association for the protection of small animal breeds, no specific management measures were implemented.

== Description ==
Considered ponies, they are closely related to the Pindos and Thessalian breeds. Some have probably been crossed with Thoroughbreds. The conformation is uniform, with a medium size and robust trunk.

Like all horses in the wild, Axios ponies live in herds comprising a breeding stallion and several mares, with stallions without a herd forming groups of single males. They have no owner. The main causes of mortality are wounds and anthracosis.

Coats include gray, bay, seal brown, black, chestnut and roan.

== Tourism ==
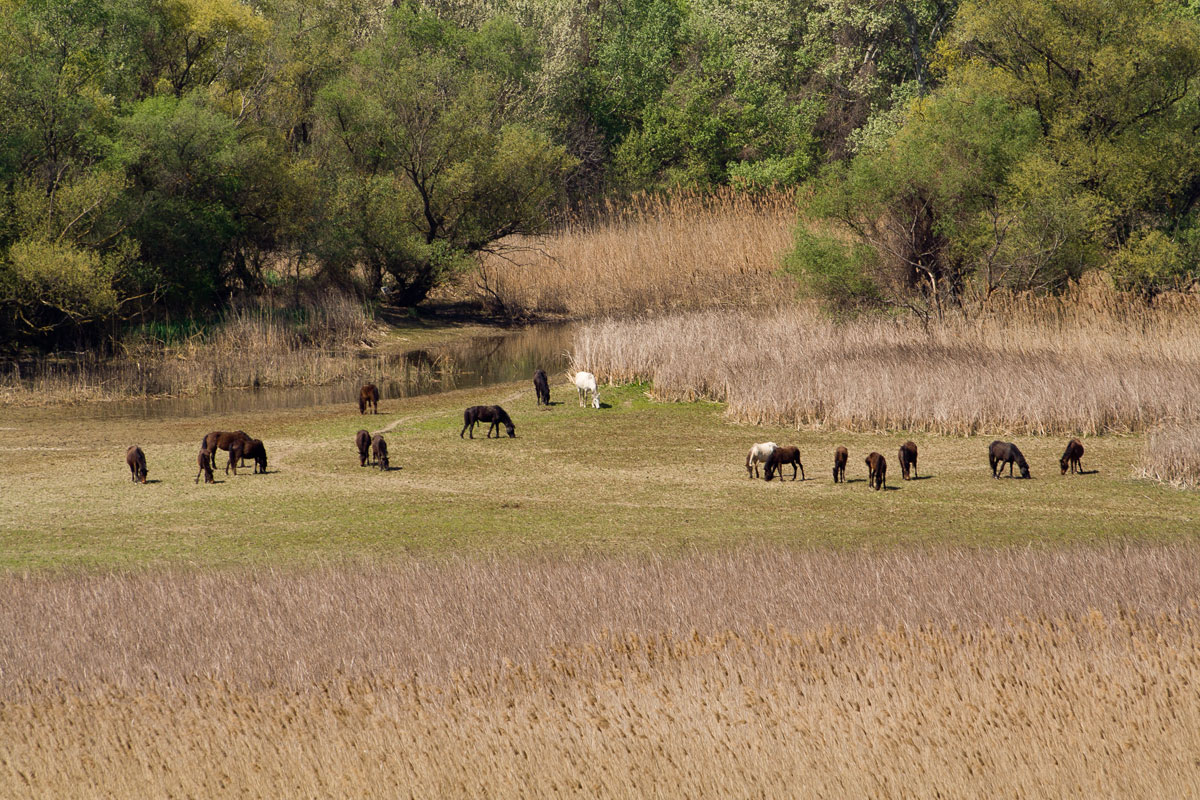
Herd near the Axios river

The characterization studies suggested that the presence of these horses could be used to develop equestrian tourism in Greece. Indeed, the presence of wild horses contributes to the appeal of the region in which they live.

The horses of Axios are now an important part of the region's fauna, attracting the attention of visiting tourists. Websites dedicated to sightseeing in Greece mention their presence, as does a guide to birdwatching in Greece, emphasizing the "majestic" aspect of watching horses in the water.

== Distribution and threats ==
Horses are considered an integral part of the Axios delta ecosystem. They compete with domestic cattle and sheep for access to food resources, livestock being the main source of soil and environmental degradation. Despite the presence of wolves, these horses do not seem to suffer any significant predation.

The main threats to them are the presence of illegal waste dumps, illegally erected fences and decomposing animal corpses on the ground, which are the cause of contamination. The region is affected by West Nile fever, and females are probably regularly captured by locals, also jeopardizing the survival of this population.

In 2008, around 68 horses were counted, meaning that the breed's numbers are stable or declining slightly. Most live in the Axios delta, with a further 20 or so on an island off the river delta near Thessaloniki. There are also some near the Aliakmon river. In 2010, the population remained at around 90, and the Delachaux guide also cites 90 individuals. This places the Axios among the critically endangered horse breeds. Although the area has been declared a national park and is classified as Natura 2000, the breed's long-term survival is not assured.

== See also ==
- Pindos Pony
- List of horse breeds
- Horses in Greece

== Bibliography ==
- Konstantinidou, Myrto; Kostaras, Nikolas (2008). Survey regarding the population & ethology of feral Axios horses in Greece 2008. Amaltheia: Greek Society for the Protection and Preservation of Indigenous Breeds of Domestic Animals.
- Kugler, Waltraud; Monitoring Institute (2009). Rare Breeds and Varieties of Greece : Atlas 2010 (PDF). Montricher: Institute for Rare Breeds and Seeds in Europe.
- Kugler, Waltraud; Broxham, Elli (2014). The Ecological Value of Feral Livestock Populations in Europe : Overview, situation and development of a network for management of wild livestock populations, Final report (PDF). SAVE-Project.
- Porter; Alderson, Lawrence; Hall, Stephen J. G.; Sponenberg, Dan Phillip (2016). Mason's World Encyclopedia of Livestock Breeds and Breeding (6th ed.). CAB International. ISBN 978-1-84593-466-8.
- Rousseau, Élise (2016). Guide des chevaux d'Europe (in French). Delachaux et Niestlé. ISBN 978-2-603-02437-9.
