= Erinia =

Island in Greece

Native name: Ερηνιά
- Location within Greece

Geography
- Coordinates: 38.83°N 24.433°E
- Archipelago: Sporades
- Area: 0.55 km^{2} (0.21 sq mi)
- Highest elevation: 15 m (49 ft)

Administration
- Greece
- Region: Central Greece
- Regional unit: Euboea

Demographics
- Population: 0 (2001)

Erinia, also Rineia (Greek: Ερηνιά or Ρήνεια), is a Greek island in the Sporades archipelago. It is located west of the island of Skyros.

== Nearest islands and islets ==
Its nearest islands and islets are Skyropoula to the west, Skyros to the north and Valaxa to the east.
