= Peneia Pony =

Breed of horse

Peneia
- Conservation status: Endangered
- Other names: Georgalidiko; Pinia
- Country of origin: Greece
- Distribution: Peloponnese

Traits
- Height: 10.1-14 hands
- Distinguishing features: Short croup; Sloping back; Long legs; Small hooves

The Peneia Pony (Greek: άλογο Πηνείας, or Greek: Πινειώτικο άλογο) is a rare breed of pony from the Peloponnese in southern Greece, originating in the former prefecture of Elis, which included the village of Peneia (Pineia).

== Characteristics ==
Peneias generally stand between 10.1 and 14 hands high, and are usually bay, black, chestnut, or gray, although other colors are seen. They have a well-proportioned head with a convex profile and a well-set neck running into low withers, a wide chest, and muscular, sloping shoulders. They have a short back, sloping croup, and long legs with small, tough hooves.

It is a fairly hardy and sure-footed breed, well adapted mountainous terrain. The natural gait of the Peneia breed is fairly stilted, so they are usually taught a smoother gait called the aravani (Greek: αραβάνι) which makes riding more comfortable. Two other names for this breed, the Ravani (Greek: Ραβάνι) and the Georgalídiko (Greek: Γεωργαλίδικο or Γιοργαλίδικο), refer to this smooth gait. These terms can also be used generically, to refer to both the Peneia and the similarly-gaited Messara. The terms giorgalídiko and ravani are derived from the Turkish language yorgala [at] and rahvan [at] (at is Turkish for "horse"). Yorgala describes a lateral ambling gait that is said to resemble that of a camel, while rahvan means "hyperactive". Yorgala is itself derived from the Greek word γοργός (gorgós), meaning "swift."

The Peneia, along with a number of other gaited horses, was the object of a research study to determine the presence of the DMRT3_Ser301STOP mutation, which is associated with gaited horses. It was possible to detect the presence of that mutation in the Peneia with a frequency of 97.1%.

== History ==
The breed was founded on an autochthonous Greek variety very possibly related to the Pindos, and later crossed with Anglo-Arab, Anglo-Norman and Nonius strains. It may have originated from Messara ponies who were requisitioned for use on the Pindos front during the Greco-Italian War in 1940 and 1941. Its herdbook was only established in 1995. The breed is found in Elis and Achaea in the northwest of the Peloponnese.

According to Greek Agriculture Ministry statistics, as of 2002 there were two hundred thirty-one breeding mares and sixty-nine stallions. As of 2017, only about one hundred specimens of the breed existed, placing it in danger of extinction.

== Uses ==
Peneias are used as draft animals, pack animals, and mounts for riding and jumping. The stallions are often used for breeding hinnies. Crosses with the Thoroughbred have produced faster horses, while the Hellenic National Stud Book Society is promoting a new breeding program crossing Peneia stallions with light draft mares.
