= Skyropoula =

Island in Greece

Native name: Σκυροπούλα
- Location within Greece

Geography
- Coordinates: 38.84°N 24.36°E
- Archipelago: Sporades
- Highest elevation: 188 m (617 ft)

Administration
- Greece
- Region: Central Greece
- Regional unit: Euboea
- Municipality: Skyros

Demographics
- Population: 0 (2011)

Additional information
- Area code: 242x0

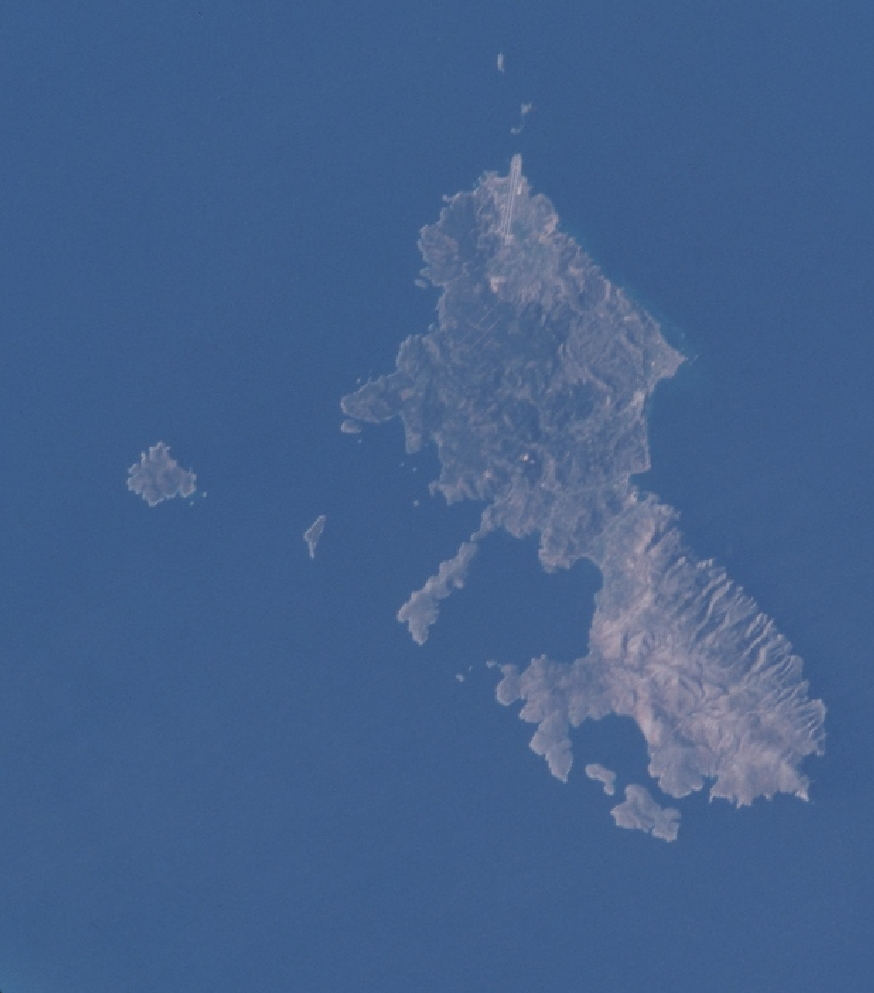

Skyropoula (Greek: Σκυροπούλα, lit. 'Little Skyros') is a Greek island in the Sporades archipelago, along the east coast of Greece. The islet of Erinia lies directly to the east as well as the main island of Skyros. From 1860 until 2001, it was the private island of the Antoniadis family. This family has a long military and naval tradition; most recently, Admiral Antonis Antoniadis served as Chief of the Hellenic Navy General Staff from 2002 to 2005. In May 2001, the island became the property of an unidentified Cypriot businessman. As of 2011, it had no resident population.

== Nearest islands and islets ==
Its nearest islands are Skantzoura to the north and Euboea to the south.
