= Silva Project =

Organization

The Silva Project is a non-profit organization centered in Corfu, Greece dedicated, in part, to the preservation of the Skyros Pony.

The Silva Project was founded by Mrs. Silvia Dimitriadis Steen, who has founded several other charitable organizations in Greece, most notably the Theotokos Institute for Special Children.
