= Axios Delta National Park =

National park in Central Macedonia, Greece

- Axios-Loudias-Aliakmonas National Park
- IUCN category VI (protected area with sustainable use of natural resources)
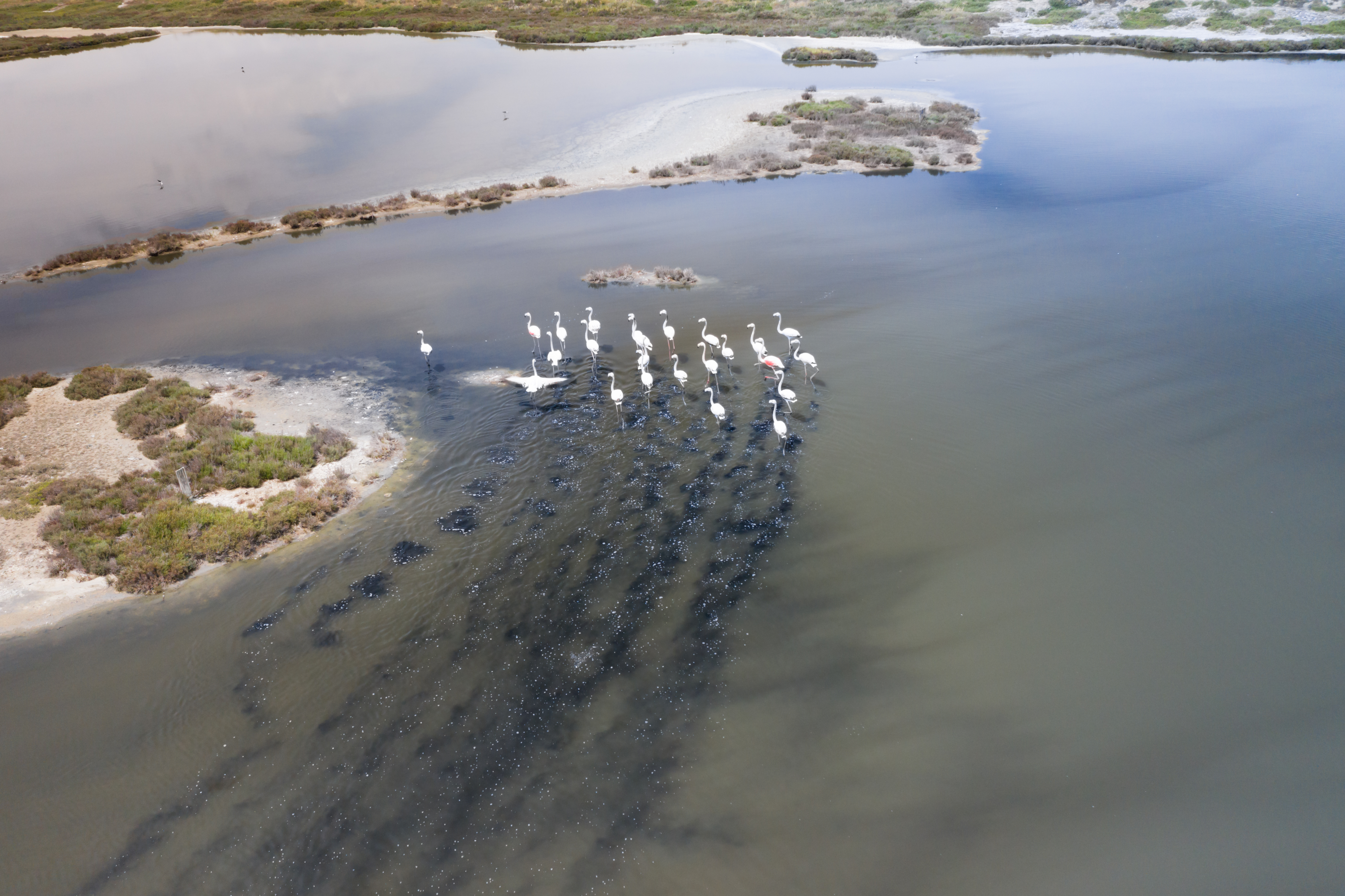

- Location within Greece
- Location: Central Macedonia, Greece
- Nearest city: Thessaloniki
- Coordinates: 40°30′35″N 22°39′59″E
- Area: 338 km^{2} (131 sq mi)
- Established: 2009

The Axios Delta National Park (Greek: Εθνικό Πάρκο Δέλτα Αξιού), officially the Axios-Loudias-Aliakmonas Delta National Park (Εθνικό Πάρκο Δέλτα Αξιού-Λουδία-Αλιάκμονα), is a national park on the west coast of the Thermaic Gulf in Greece, consisting of multiple wetlands. It covers an area of 338 km^{2} (131 sq mi) and is a Ramsar site, an Important Bird Area and part of the Natura 2000 network.

== Geography ==
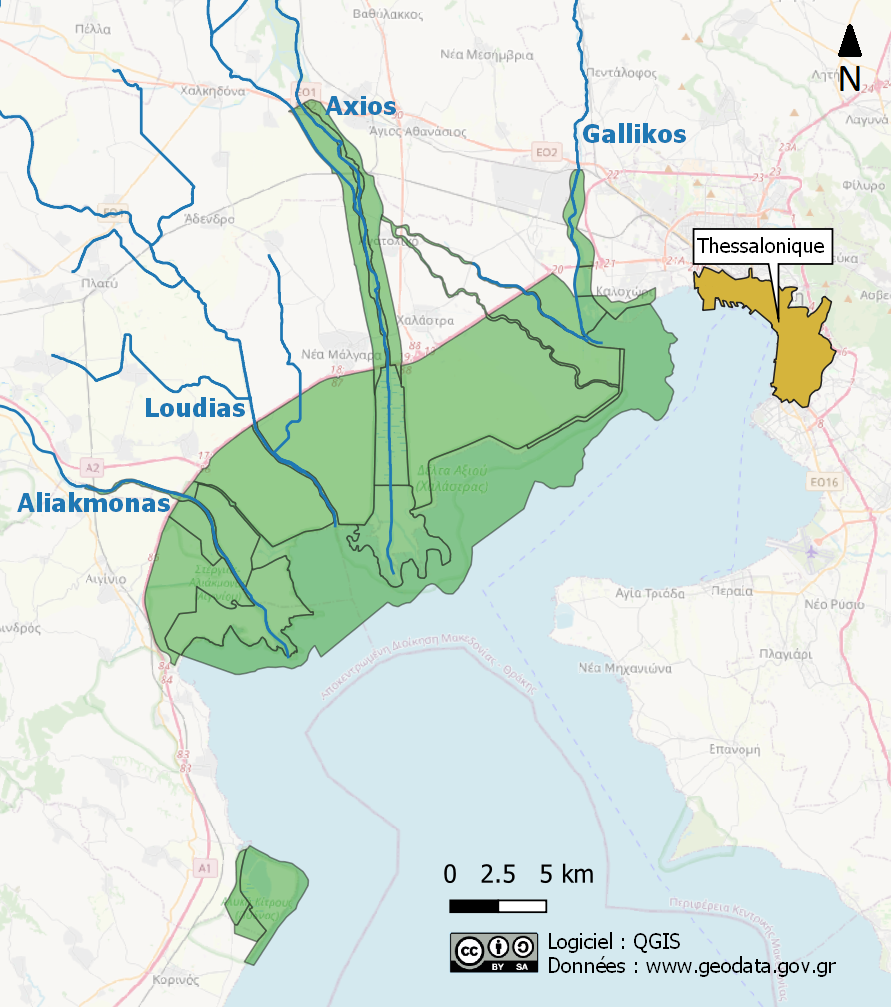
Map of the Axios Delta National Park (green) and the city of Thessaloniki (orange)

The Axios Delta National Park consists of the Axios riverbed and delta, the Haliacmon delta, the Kalochori lagoon, the Alyki Kitrous lagoon, the Nea Agathoupoli wetland, the Gallikos river estuary and the mouth of the Loudias river. It is located in Central Macedonia, and it lies within five regional units: Pieria, Imathia, Pella, Kilkis and Thessaloniki. In the latter, the park's borders extent as near as 10 kilometers from the major city of Thessaloniki.

The park lies within the Aegean and Western Turkey sclerophyllous and mixed forests ecoregion and is situated on one of the main migratory routes for birds in Europe.

== Climate ==
Under the Köppen climate classification the Axios Delta National Park has a cold semi-arid (BSk) climate. The summers are hot and the winters are cold and wet. Extreme weather phenomena are rarely recorded in the park during the winter. Snowfall is infrequent and the waters almost never freeze. Most rains occur in autumn and the park has an average annual precipitation of 442.5 mm (17.4 in).

== Flora ==
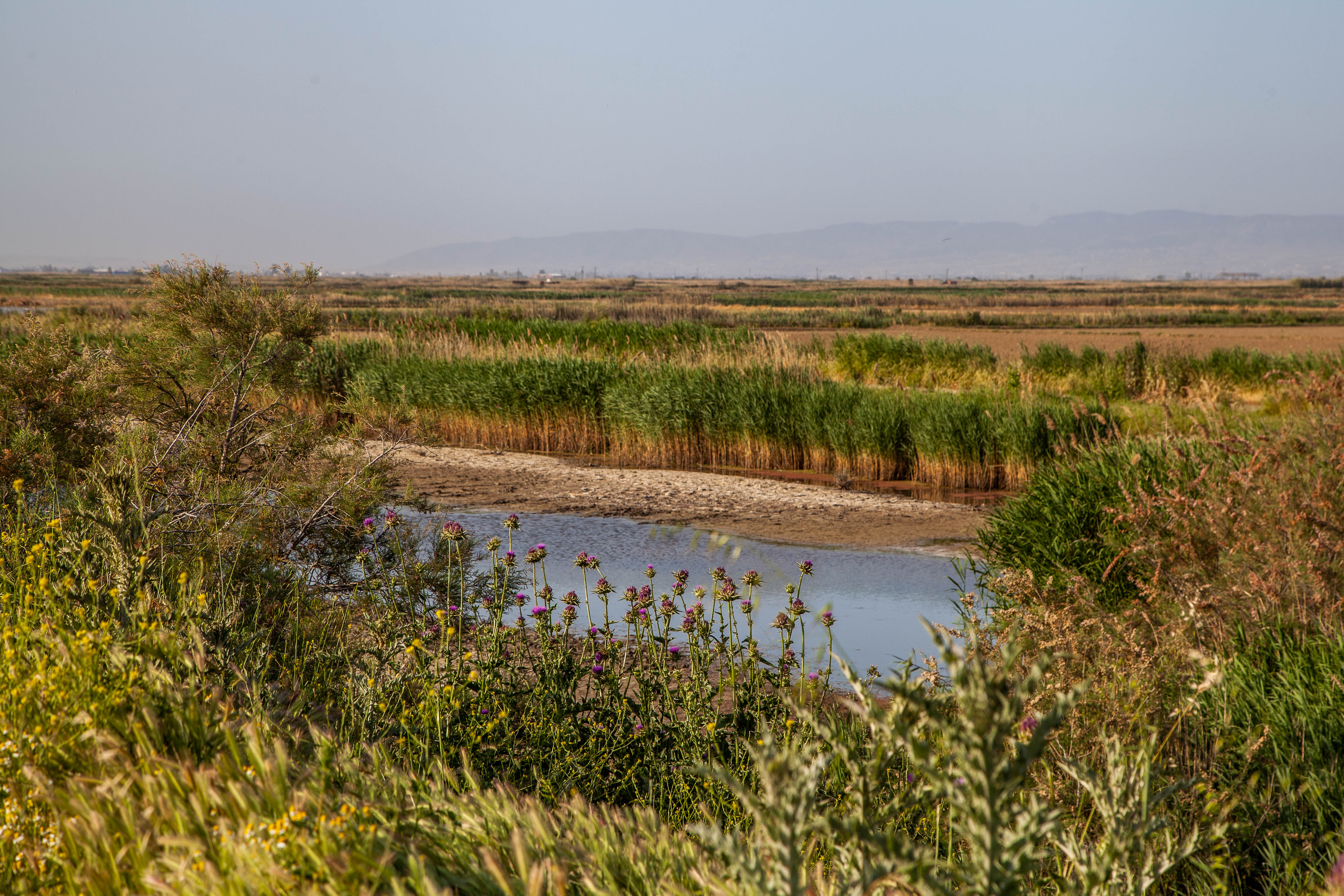
Reedbed habitat at the Axios Delta National Park

In the Axios Delta National Park there is a number of 370 plant species and vegetation is present in all of the park. Glassworts cover large parts of the lagoons, forming little islands; common reeds and bulrushes create reedbed habitats; European alders, elms, willows and other trees are part of a forest that protects riverbanks from erosion; and common purslanes, petty spurges and many more plants thrive at the sand dunes of the park.

== Fauna ==
=== Avifauna ===
In the Axios Delta National Park has been recorded an astonishing number of 299 bird species, giving it worldwide ornithological importance. Some of these birds are the Dalmatian pelican, the greater flamingo, the collared pratincole, the Mediterranean gull, the pygmy cormorant, the Kentish plover, the glossy ibis and the squacco heron. 66% of all the bird species that have been observed in Greece are found at this national park.

=== Mammals ===
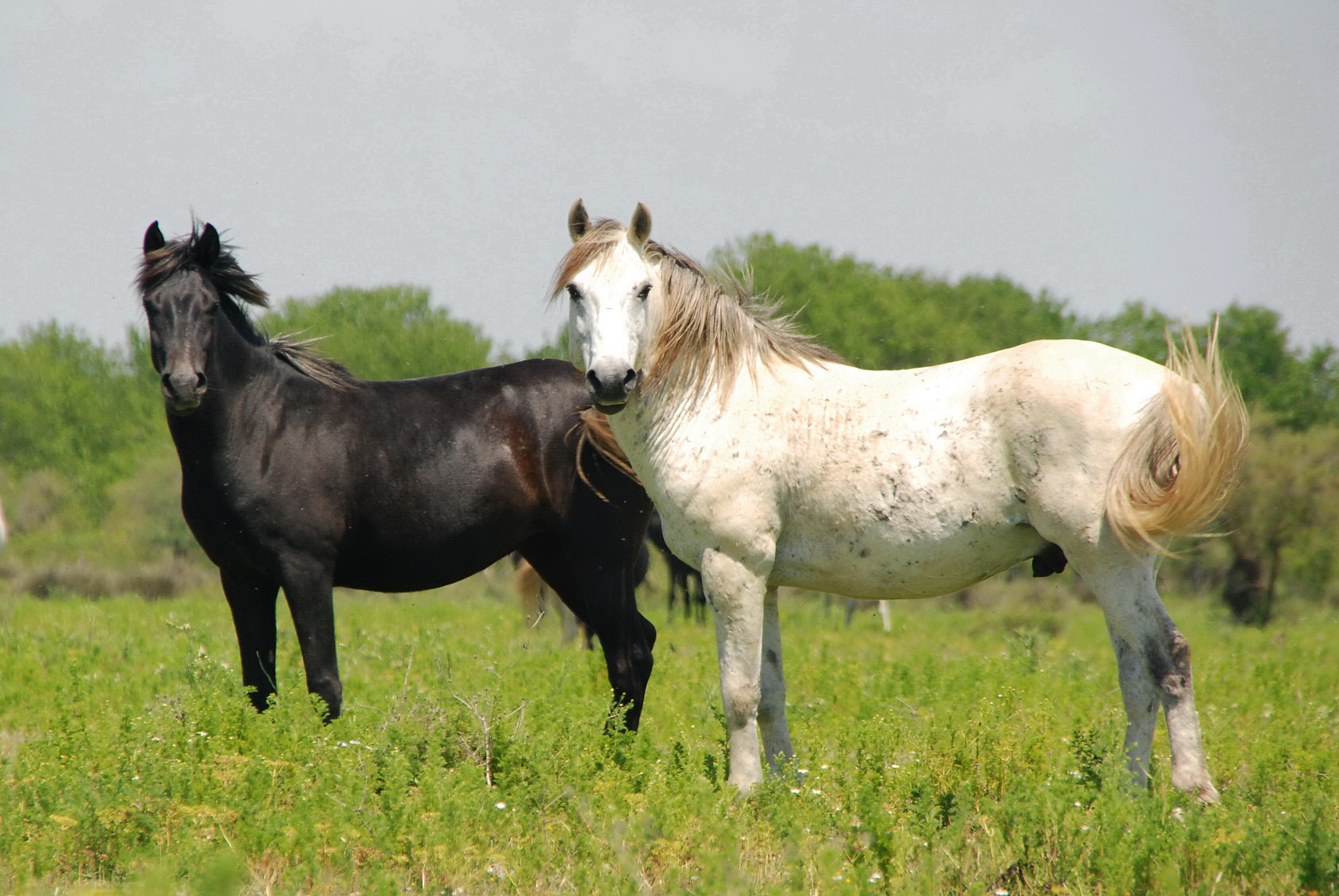
Two wild Axios horses

In the Axios Delta National Park 40 species of mammals have been registered. Some examples are the grey wolf, the Eurasian badger, the European wildcat, the golden jackal, the red fox and the Eurasian otter. The park is also home to 15 species of bats and a number of rodents, like the forest dormouse and the European ground squirrel, which is listed as endangered with extinction by the IUCN in its Red List of Threatened Species. An introduced species, the nutria, is also present in the area. It has been living in the park for more than 60 years, after some individuals escaped from a fur farm. Non indigenous are also the Axios horses, a breed of feral horses that is only found in this park. They are the descendants of some horses that were abandoned by the local farmers in the early 1960s and since then have been integrated into the ecosystem. William Martin Leake during his travels in the 19th century also documented the presence of wild boars in the area, though they're now considered locally extinct.

=== Reptiles ===
The Axios Delta National Park is home to 19 species of reptiles, 8 of which are snakes, 6 are lizards, 2 are terrapins and another 2 are tortoises. Both tortoise species, the Greek tortoise and the Hermann's tortoise, are threatened and listed as vulnerable in the IUCN Red List. The area of the park which is covered with sand dunes between the Alyki Kitrous lagoon and the Aegean sea has the largest population of Hermann's tortoises in Europe and it is the most densely populated in the world.

=== Amphibians ===
A total number of 8 species of amphibians have been recorded in the Axios Delta National Park. Some examples are the Balkan frog, the Macedonian crested newt, the European tree frog and the eastern spadefoot.

=== Ichthyofauna ===
There are at least 38 species of freshwater fish living in the Axios Delta National Park and it is estimated that there are about 20 more saltwater fishes living in the coastal zone of the park. Freshwater species include the Danube barbel and the Rhodeus meridionalis, while some saltwater ones are the Mediterranean killifish and the twait shad.

=== Invertebrates ===
Many invertebrates are found in the Axios Delta National Park, like butterflies, bivalves, beetles, gastropods and dragonflies of numerous species. One of them is Pinna nobilis, a large species of clam which has lost more than 80% of its global population during the last decade and it is listed as critically endangered in the IUCN Red List of Threatened Species.

== Human activity ==
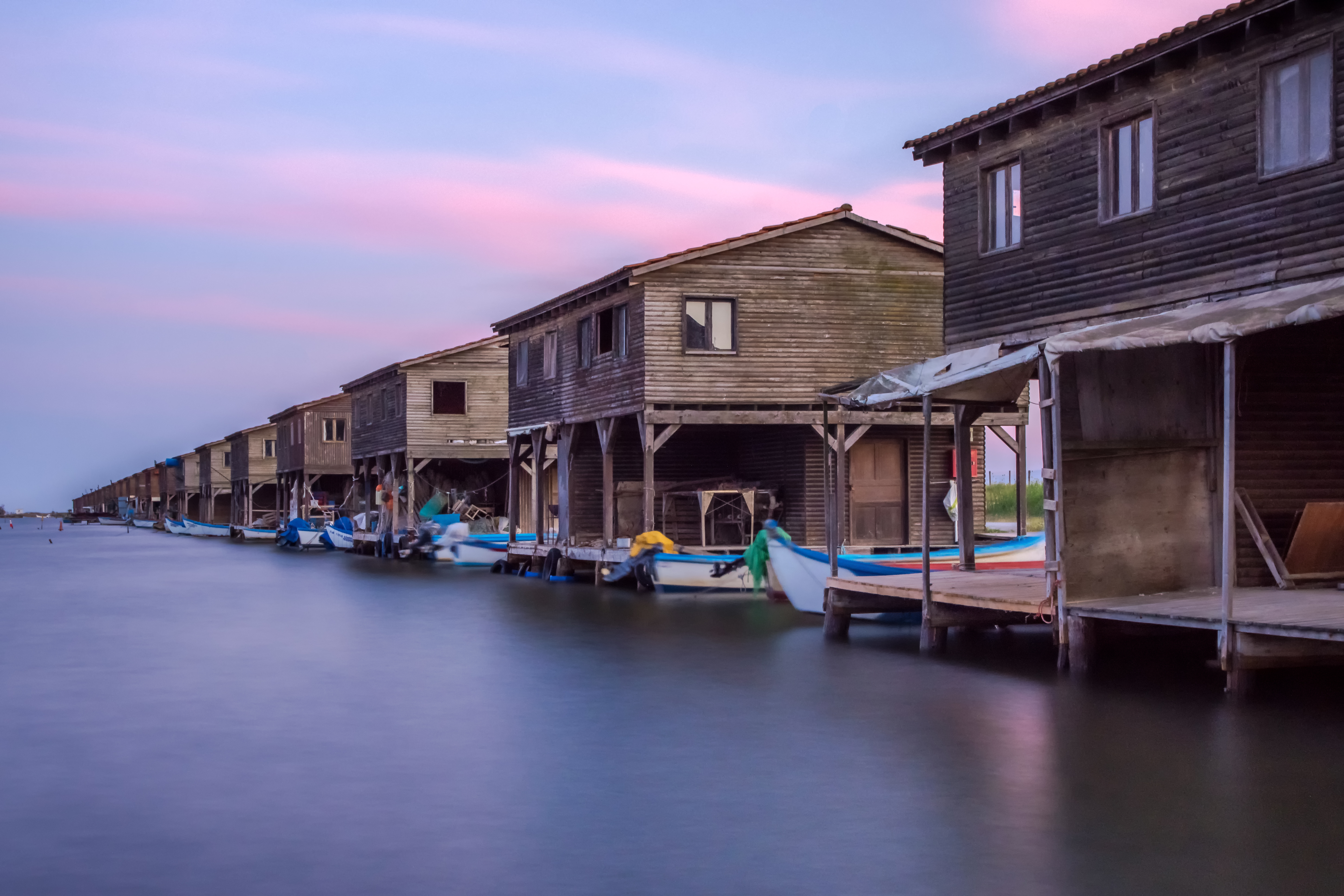
Fishermen houses at the Axios Delta National Park

=== Mussel cultivation ===
Along the coastal zone of the Axios Delta National Park, 30,000 tons of mussels of the Mytilus galloprovincialis species are produced each year. This represents 80-90% of all mussel production in Greece. The Axios, Haliacmon and Loudias rivers introduce nutrients, which, in turn, serve to make this region particularly well suited for mussel production.

=== Rice production ===
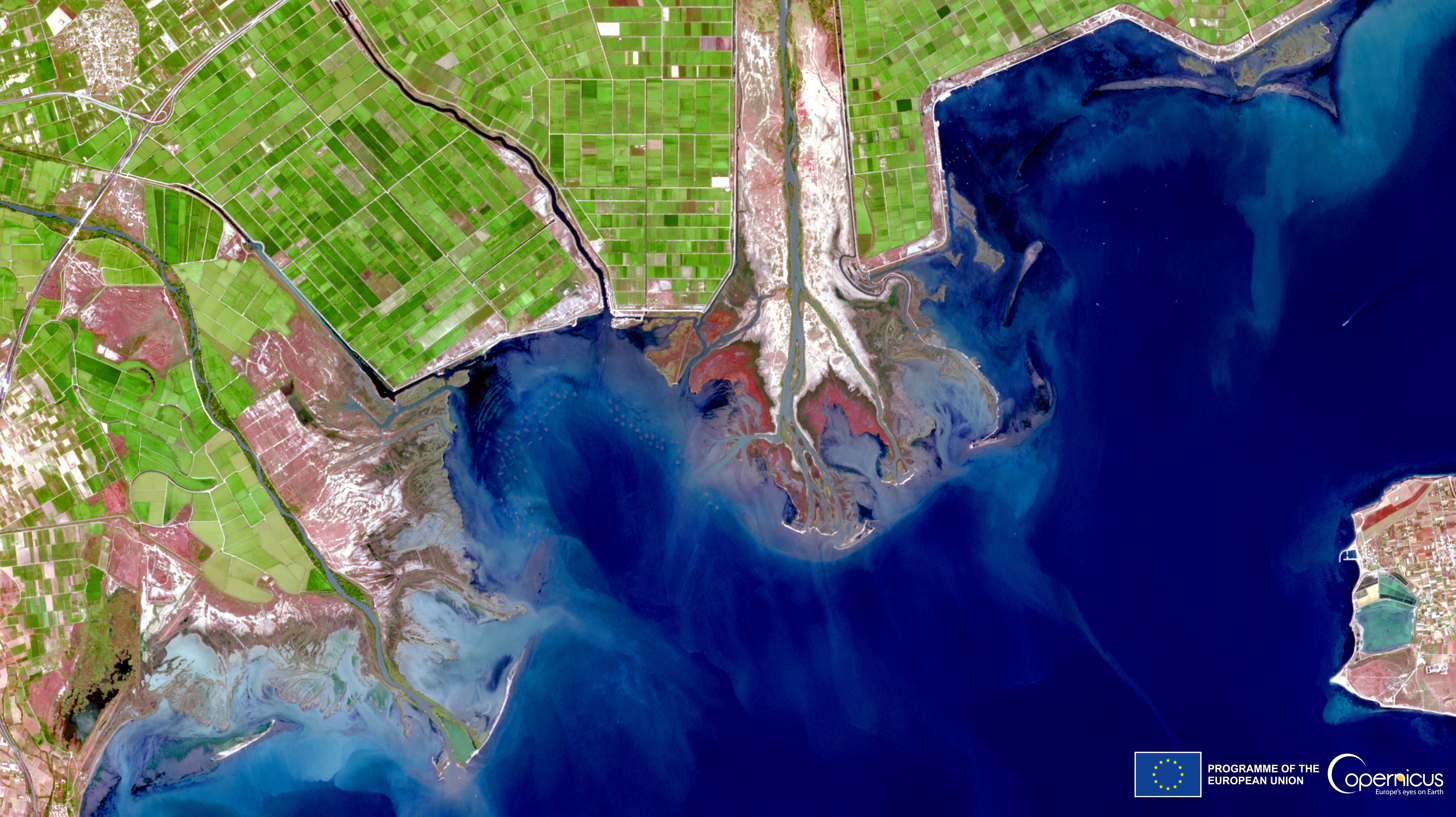
Axios Delta National Park as seen by the Copernicus Sentinel-2 satellites

About 10,000 hectares of rice paddies extend within the Axios Delta National Park, thus occupying almost a third of its area. The rice grown in the park is of the Japonica and the Indica varieties.

=== Salt production ===
The second largest salt production facility in Greece is located at the western part of the Alyki Kitrous lagoon. A 400 hectares salt evaporation pond produces 28,000 tons of salt each year.

=== Water buffalo farming ===
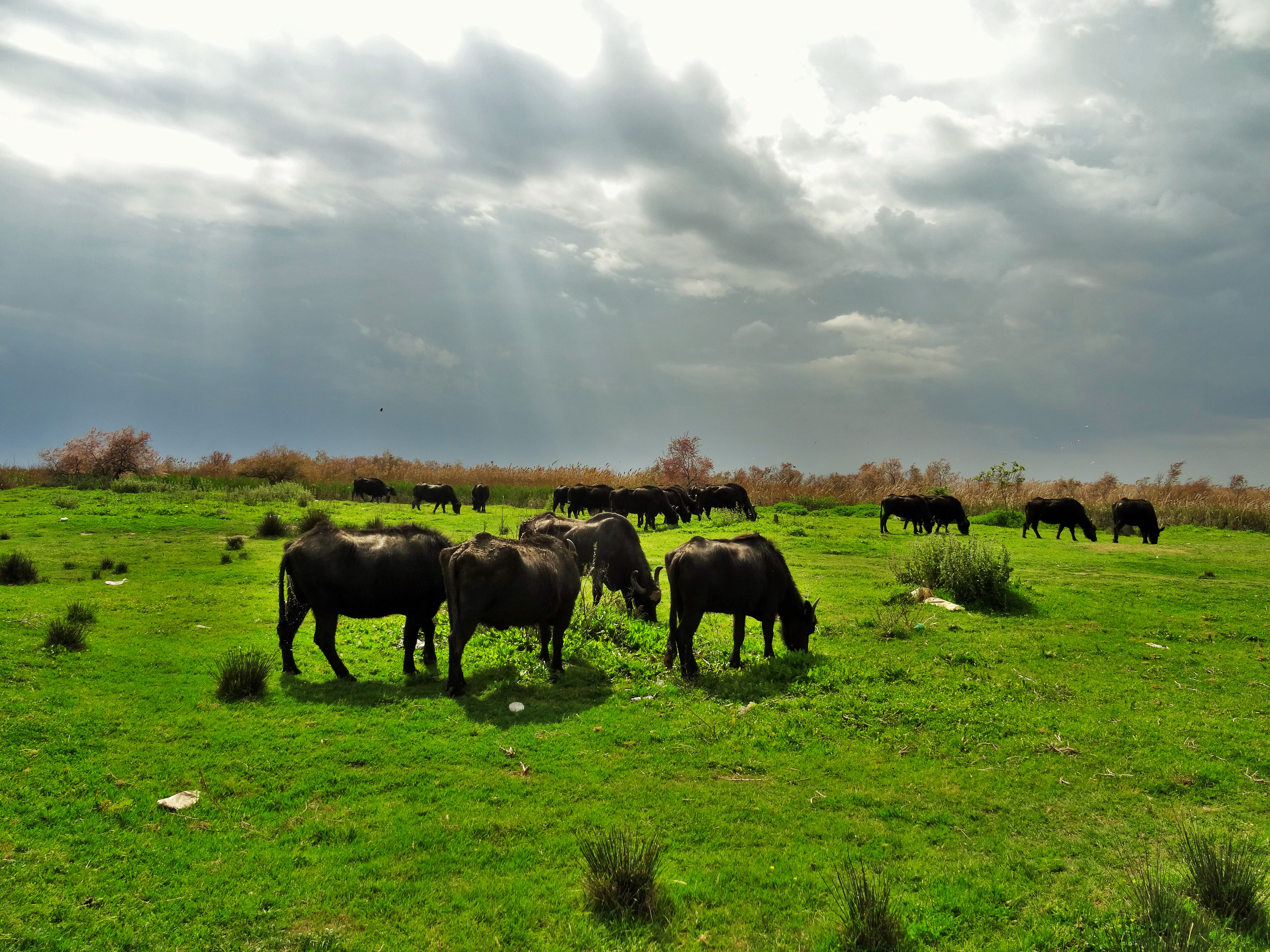
Water buffaloes at the Axios Delta National Park

One of the largest herds of water buffaloes in Greece lives at the mouth of the Gallikos river in the Axios Delta National Park. Greek buffaloes date back 2,500 years ago and were brought to the country when Xerxes used them to carry his army's supplies across the Struma river during the Greco-Persian Wars.
