= Skyros Pony =

Breed of horse

Skyros
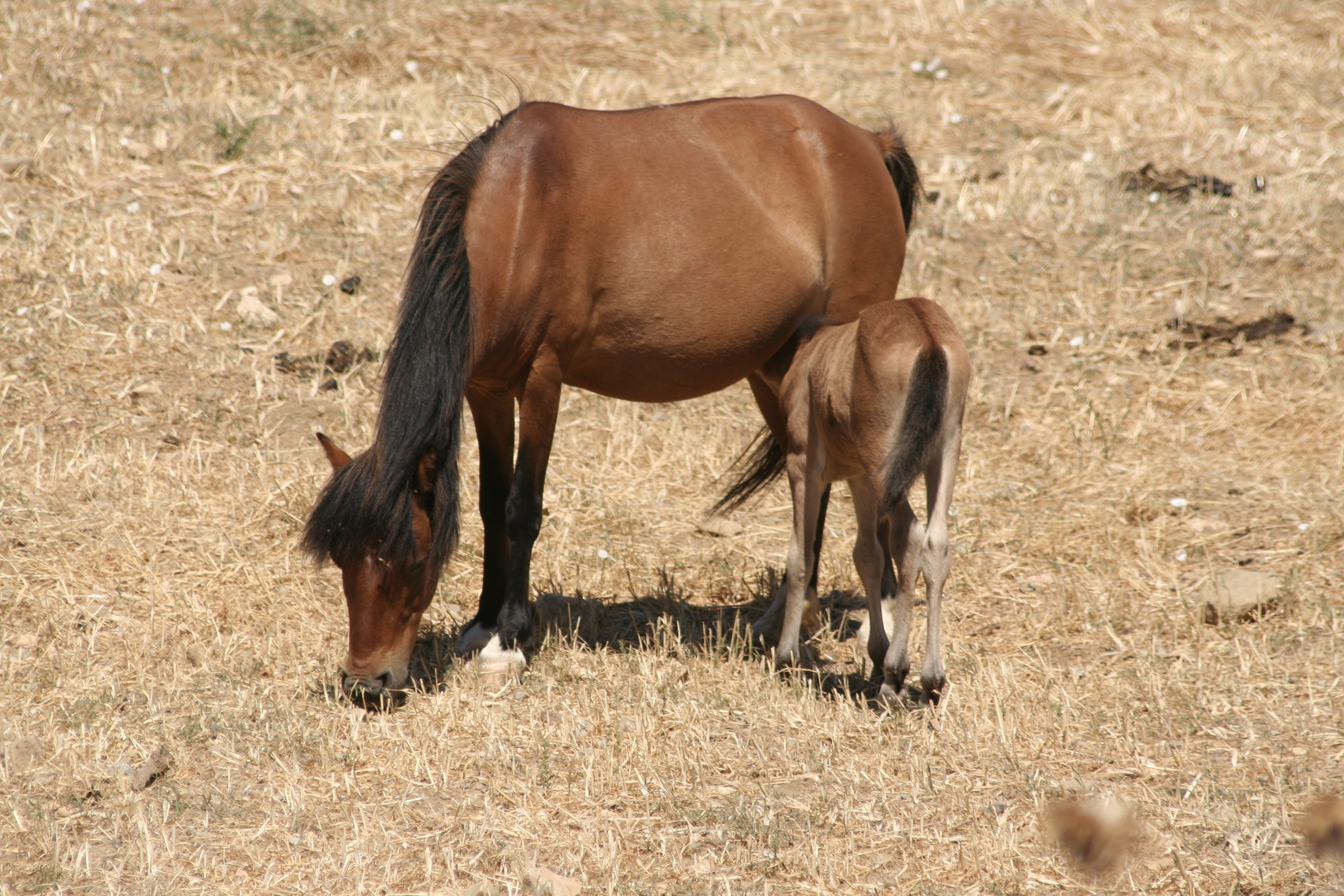
- Skyros mare and foal
- Other names: Skyrian Horse; Skyrian Pony
- Country of origin: Greece (Skyros)

Traits
- Distinguishing features: Very small stature, semi-domesticated

The Skyrian Horse (Greek αλογάκι της Σκύρου) is a breed of miniature horse found on the Greek isle of Skyros.

== Breed characteristics ==
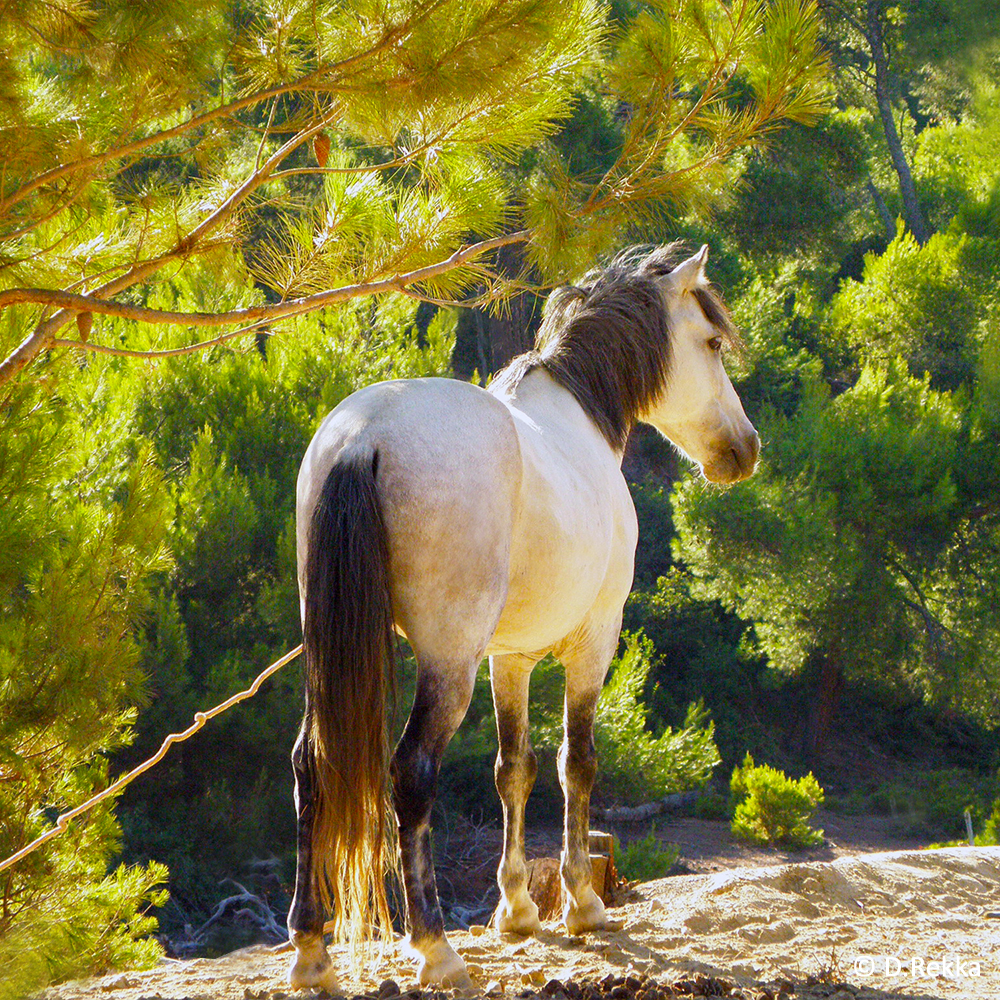
Their legs are slim, strong and wiry, with strong joints. The tail is low set.

The Skyros breed generally stands between 9.1 and 11 hands (92 to 115 cm) high, and may be, bay, dun, brown or black. The small-bodied species of the Skyrian horse is one of the rarest horse breeds in the world. It is native to Greece, and in ancient times lived throughout the country, but now is only found in the wild in Skyros and in breeding and welfare farms on the island of Skyros. At the time of writing [2009] there are 220 Skyrian horses in Greece, of which 152 live in Skyros. The Skyrian horse is a protected species.

The Skyrian horses are friendly, social, robust and intelligent animals. Their mane is long and thick and usually a hue darker than the skin colour. Their legs are slim, strong and wiry, with strong joints. The tail is low set. The hooves are small, compact and strong, usually black, and do not need shoeing. It is preferred by the breed standard to have very limited white markings eg a small star is acceptable .

The Silva Project is currently working to promote the foundation of Skyros herds elsewhere in Greece and abroad. The Skyros Island Horse Trust based in Skyros is also running breeding, conservation, education and welfare projects with the Skyrian horses. Another key organisation working to protect the Skyrian horse is the Skyrian horse society, which has created a stud book and is setting up a pedigree for the Skyrian horse.

Also, another non-profit organisation Hippolytus est. 2010 (ελληνικά Ιππόλυτος) based in Falani Larissa is making efforts towards promoting the breed culturally and at the same time helping with its preservation.

== History ==
VOA report about the breed

The Skyros breed is believed to be descended from horses brought to the island of Skyros during the 5th to 8th centuries BCE by Athenian colonists. It is possible that they were used by Alexander the Great in his conquests, and also possible that they are the horses depicted in the friezes of the Parthenon.

They developed mainly as semi-feral horses in the mountainous area on the southern part of the island, although individuals were caught and tamed by farmers for agricultural uses. The advances in agricultural mechanisation during the 1960s threatened the survival of the breed, as they were no longer needed for farm work and their numbers were already low. The prevalence of feral donkeys in the same area of Skyros is also a threat, as the two groups cross-breed and prevent pure breeding by the Skyros horses.

During the 1970s, there was a short-lived breeding program focused on the Skyros breed. This program brought publicity to the breed and resulted in them being declared critically endangered in 1991.

== Uses ==
The horses are often kept semi-wild, ranging the mountainous interior of the island until they are needed at the harvest for threshing grain. Skyroi are also used as pack horses, harness horses, and for riding.
