= Messara horse =

Breed of horse

Messara
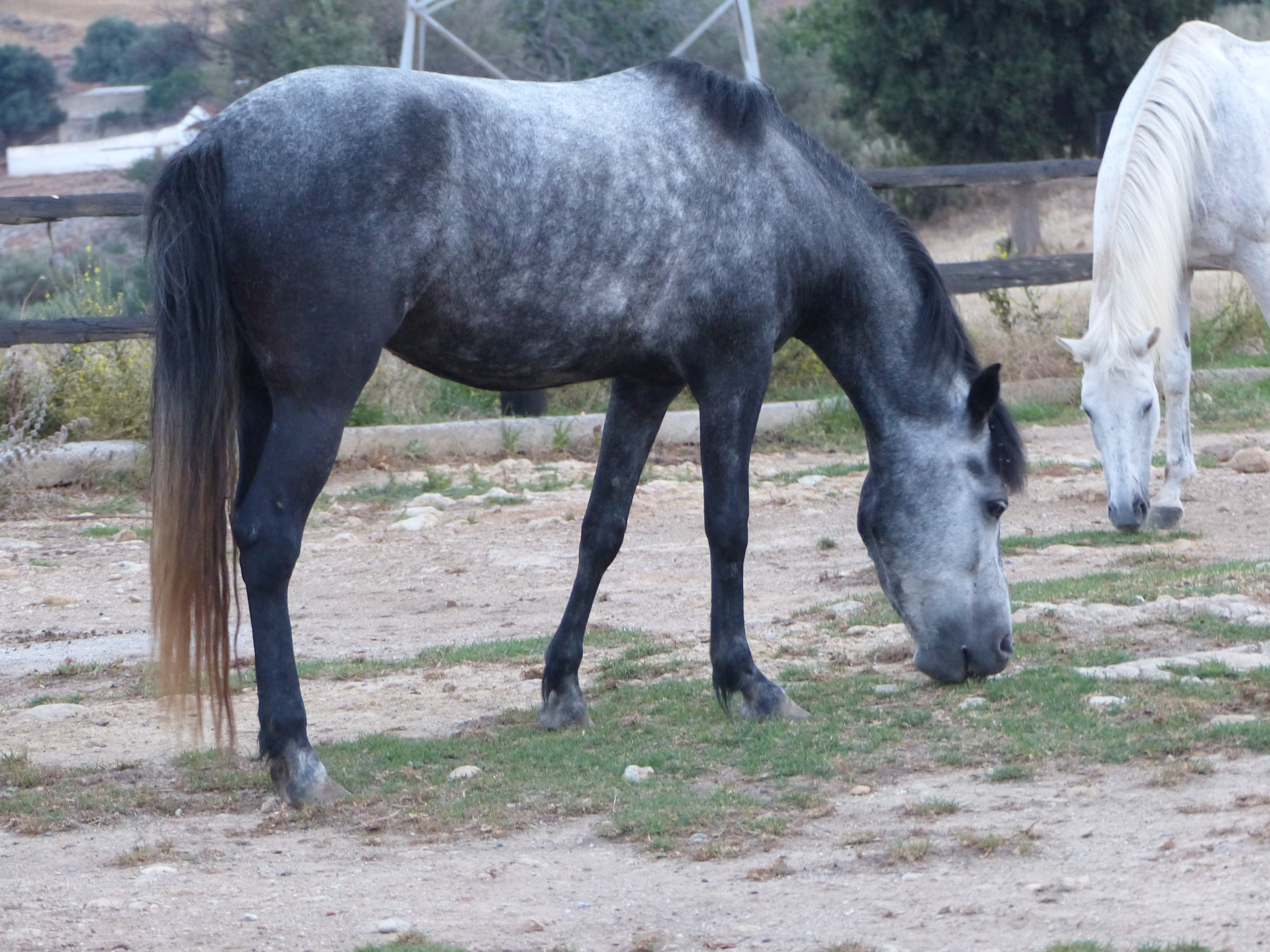
- Young Cretan horse at Georgioupoli, Grillos stables
- Other names: Cretan Horse
- Country of origin: Crete

The Messara (also known as Cretan horse) is a light riding and draft horse found on the island of Crete off the coast of Greece.

== Characteristics ==
The main coat colours found in the Messara are bay, brown (a variation of bay), black and gray. They usually stand between 12.2 and 14 hands (50 and 56 inches, 127 and 142 cm) high. They retain some characteristics of their Arabian ancestors. Most Messara ponies have a natural pacing gait that is easy and comfortable to ride. They are very good at walking on rocky ground and uneven surfaces.

== Breed history ==
The native mountain-type Messara pony has been on the Island of Crete for at least 1000 years. The name comes from the Messara Plain where they are usually found. Cretan horses were developed by crossing native and Arabian breeds imported during the Ottoman occupation in the 17th century. It is now a rare breed with only around 100 representatives. Since 1994 there is a studbook and a conservation programme has been started.

== Uses ==
Messara horses are used for light farm work and for transportation, but more often are also being used for riding and racing. The stallions are often crossed with female donkeys (Jennies) to produce hinnies.
