= Pindos Pony =

Greek breed of small horse

Pindos
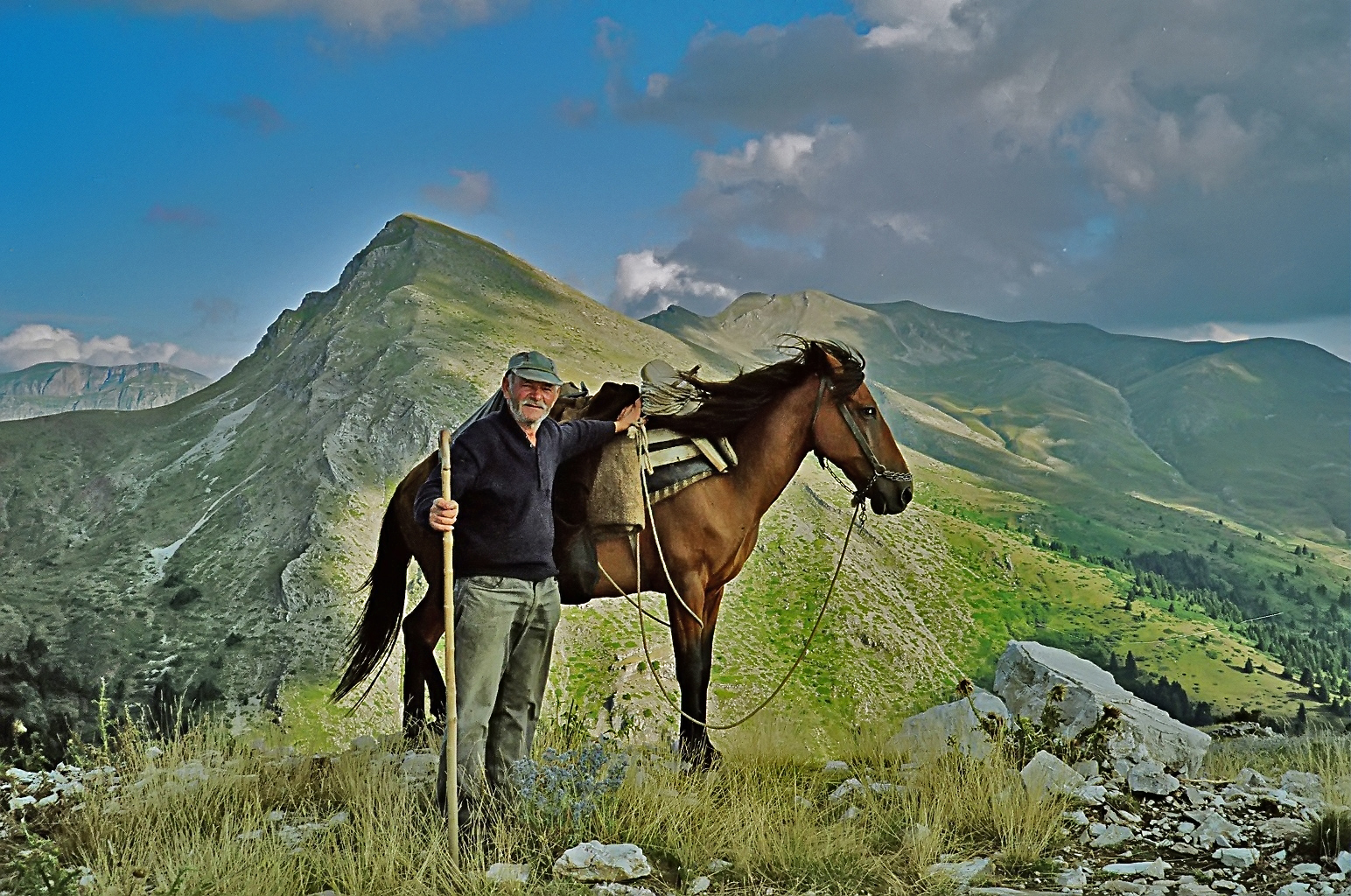
- Conservation status: FAO (2007): endangered-maintained
- Other names: Pindhos
- Country of origin: Greece
- Distribution: Epirus, Thessaly

Traits
- Height: average: 132 cm

The Pindos (Greek: αλογάκι της Πίνδου) is breed of pony or small horse native to the Pindus mountain range in Thessaly and Epirus in Greece. It is also present in mountainous parts of Thrace and Macedonia. There is a feral herd near Neochori, Karditsa, close to Lake Plastiras.

The Pindos is hardy and frugal, with good stamina, and is used for riding, driving, and as a pack and draught animal for forestry and farming. The hooves are boxy and narrow but strong, so shoeing is not often needed. It is smaller and shorter than the Thessalian, with an average height at the withers of about 132 cm.

In 2002 the recorded population consisted of 464 breeding mares and 81 stallions.

== See also ==
- List of horse breeds
- Axios horse
