= Skyros =

Island in Greece

Skyros Σκύρος
- Municipality
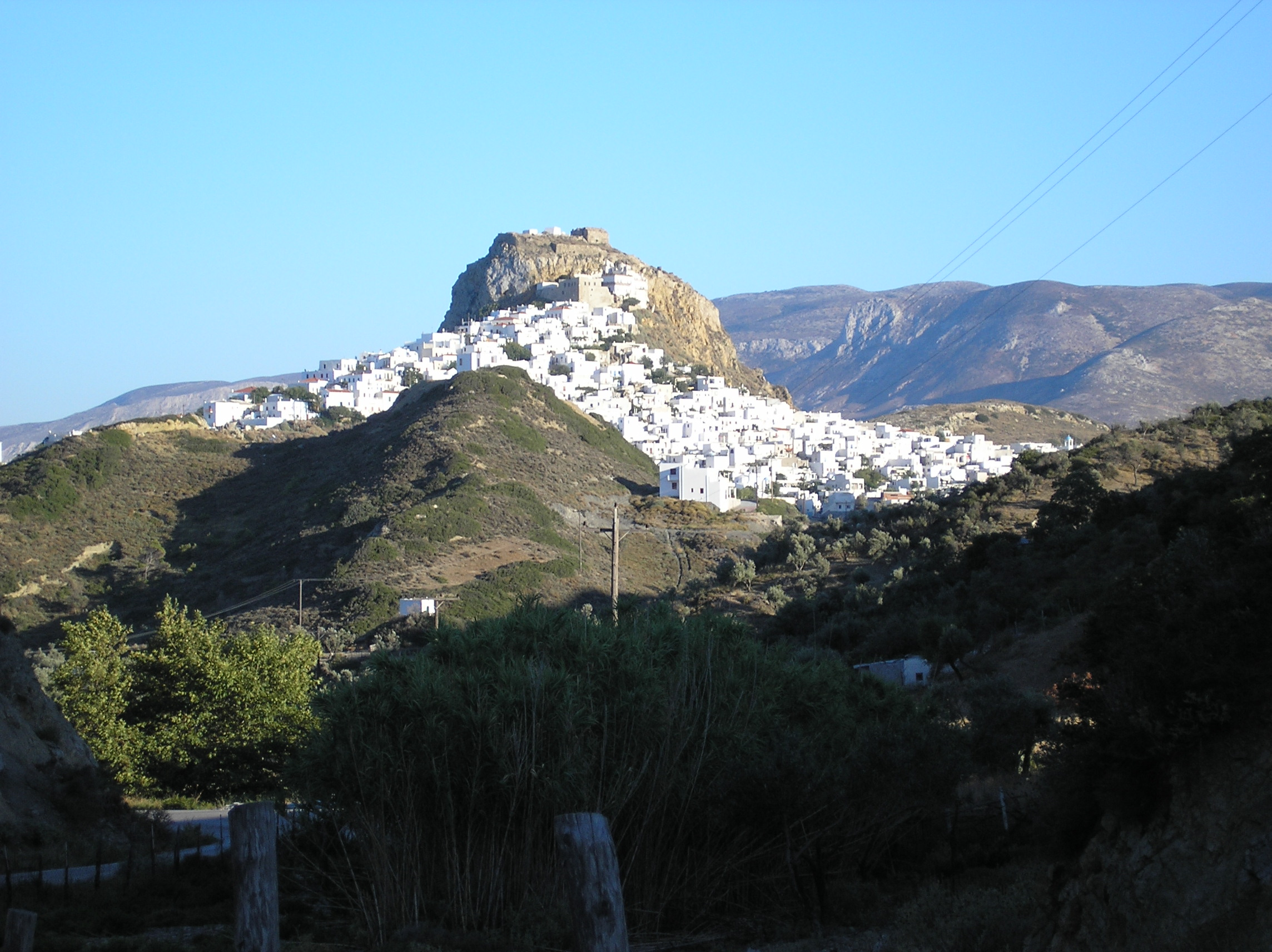
- Chora

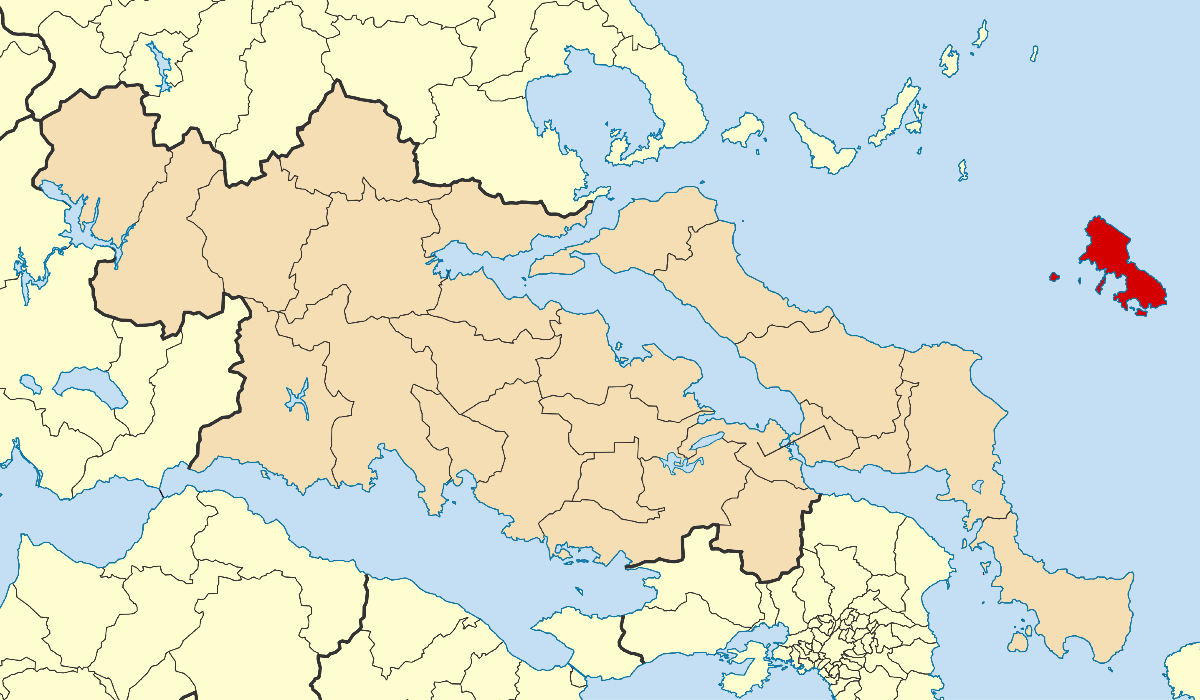

- Location within Greece
- Coordinates: 38°52′21″N 24°31′30″E
- Country: Greece
- Administrative region: Central Greece
- Regional unit: Euboea

Area
  - Municipality: 223.10 km^{2} (86.14 sq mi)
- Highest elevation: 792 m (2,598 ft)
- Lowest elevation: 0 m (0 ft)

Population (2021)
  - Municipality: 3,052
  - Density: 13.68/km^{2} (35.43/sq mi)
- Time zone: UTC+2 (EET)
  - Summer (DST): UTC+3 (EEST)
- Postal code: 340 07
- Area code: 22x0
- Vehicle registration: ΧΑ

Skyros (Modern Greek: Σκύρος, pronounced [ˈsciros]), in some historical contexts Latinized Scyros (Ancient Greek: Σκῦρος, Attic Greek pronunciation: [skŷːros]), is an island in Greece. It is the southernmost inhabited island of the Sporades, an archipelago in the Aegean Sea. Around the 2nd millennium BC, the island was known as The Island of the Magnetes; later, it was consecutively known as Pelasgia, Dolopia, and finally Skyros. At 209 km^{2} (81 sq mi), it is the largest island of the Sporades, and had a population of about 3,000 in 2021.

== Municipality ==
The municipality Skyros is part of the regional unit of Euboea. Apart from the island Skyros, the municipality consists of the small inhabited island of Skyropoula and a few smaller uninhabited islands. The total area of the municipality is 223.10 km^{2} (86 sq mi).

== Etymology ==
One account associates the name Skyros with skyron or skiron, meaning "stone debris". The island had a reputation for its decorative stone.

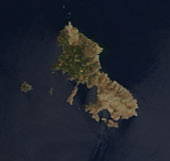
Satellite photo of Skyros and Skyropoula

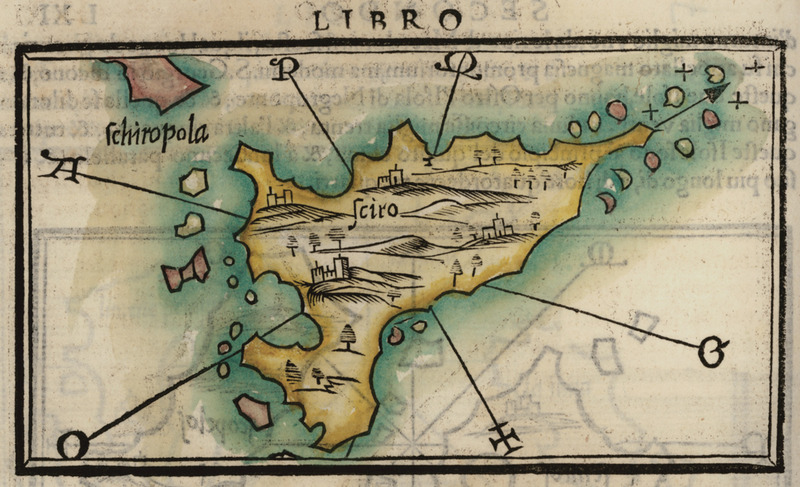
Map of Skyros by Benedetto Bordone, 1547

== Mythology ==
In Greek mythology, the Athenian king Theseus died in exile on Skyros. After being ousted from power, he fled to the island where he held ancestral estates. The local king, Lycomedes, threw him from a cliff, either as a favor to the new king of Athens or because he feared Theseus' fame. Others say Theseus slipped as he took his customary walk along the cliffs.

In some accounts, Skyros was under the control of Peleus, king of Phthia. When the local Dolopes revolted against his rule, he sent his son Achilles to take control of the island.

The island is also famous in the myths for hosting Achilles before he fought at Troy. In some versions, his mother Thetis hid him there in the disguise of a girl. She feared his prophesied death in the Trojan War. In others, he landed on Skyros after mistakenly attacking the land of Mysia. The Iliad mentions that he conquered the place, taking the citadel of Enyeus.

Whilst on Skyros, Achilles slept with Deidamia, the daughter of King Lycomedes. She bore him a son, Neoptolemus, who would later join the war against Troy. He was raised on the island.

On the east coast of the island, there is a small bay named Achili. It is said to be the place from where Achilles left with the Greeks, or rather where Achilles landed during a squall that befell the Greek fleet following their attack on Mysia.

== History ==
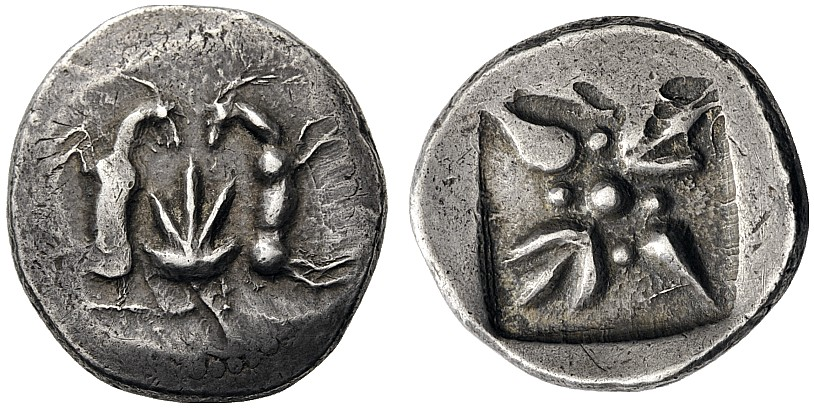
Early coinage of Skyros, c. 485–480 BC

In c. 475 BC, according to Thucydides (1.98), Cimon defeated the Dolopians (the original inhabitants) and conquered the entire island. From that date, Athenian settlers colonized it and it became a part of the Athenian Empire. The island lay on the strategic trade route between Attica and the Black Sea (Athens depended on supplies of grain reaching it through the Hellespont). Cimon claimed to have found the remains of Theseus, and returned them to Athens.

In 340 BC, the Macedonians took over the island and dominated it until 192 BC, when King Philip V of Macedon and the Roman Republican forces restored it to Athens.

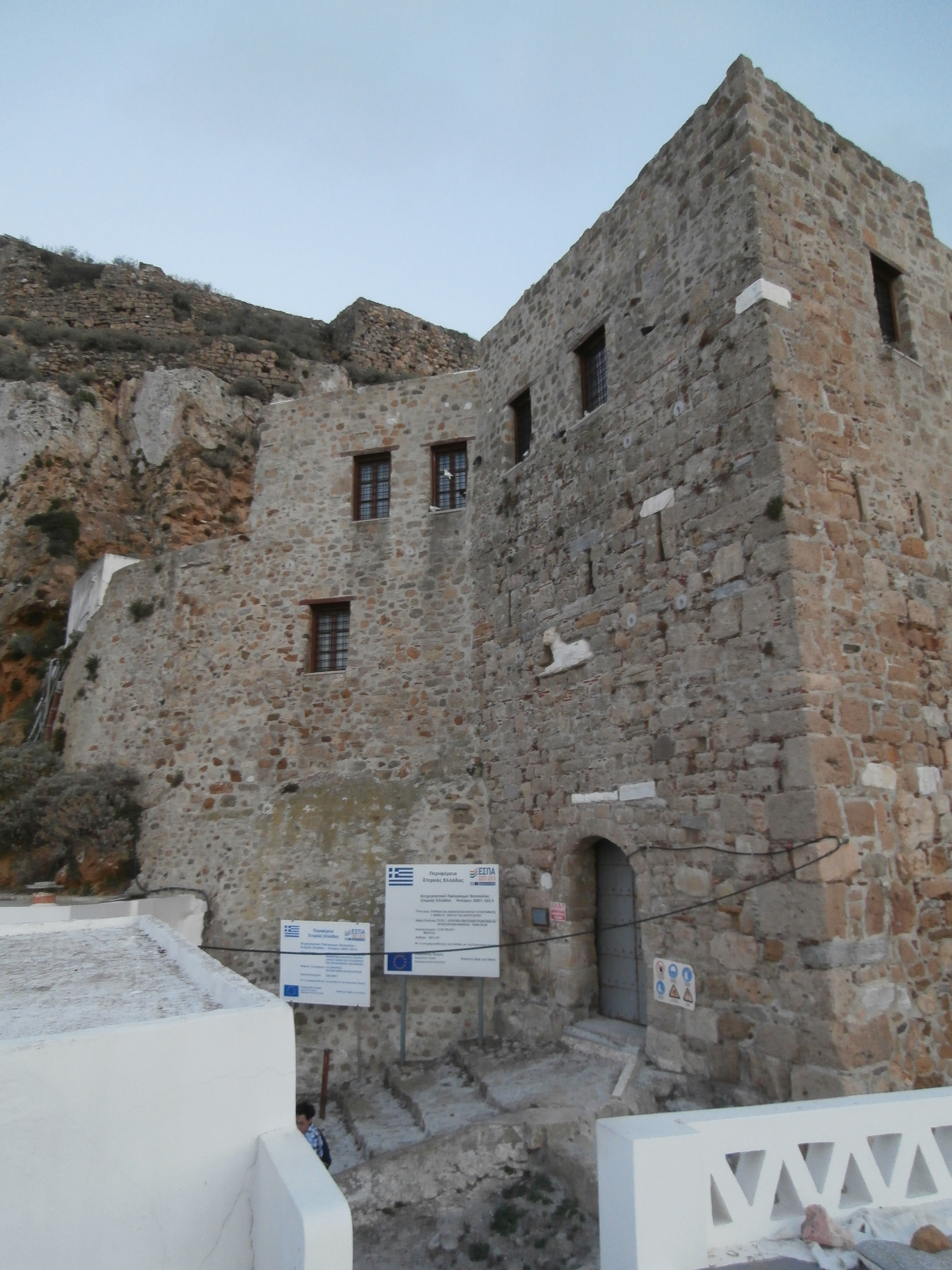
View of the medieval castle

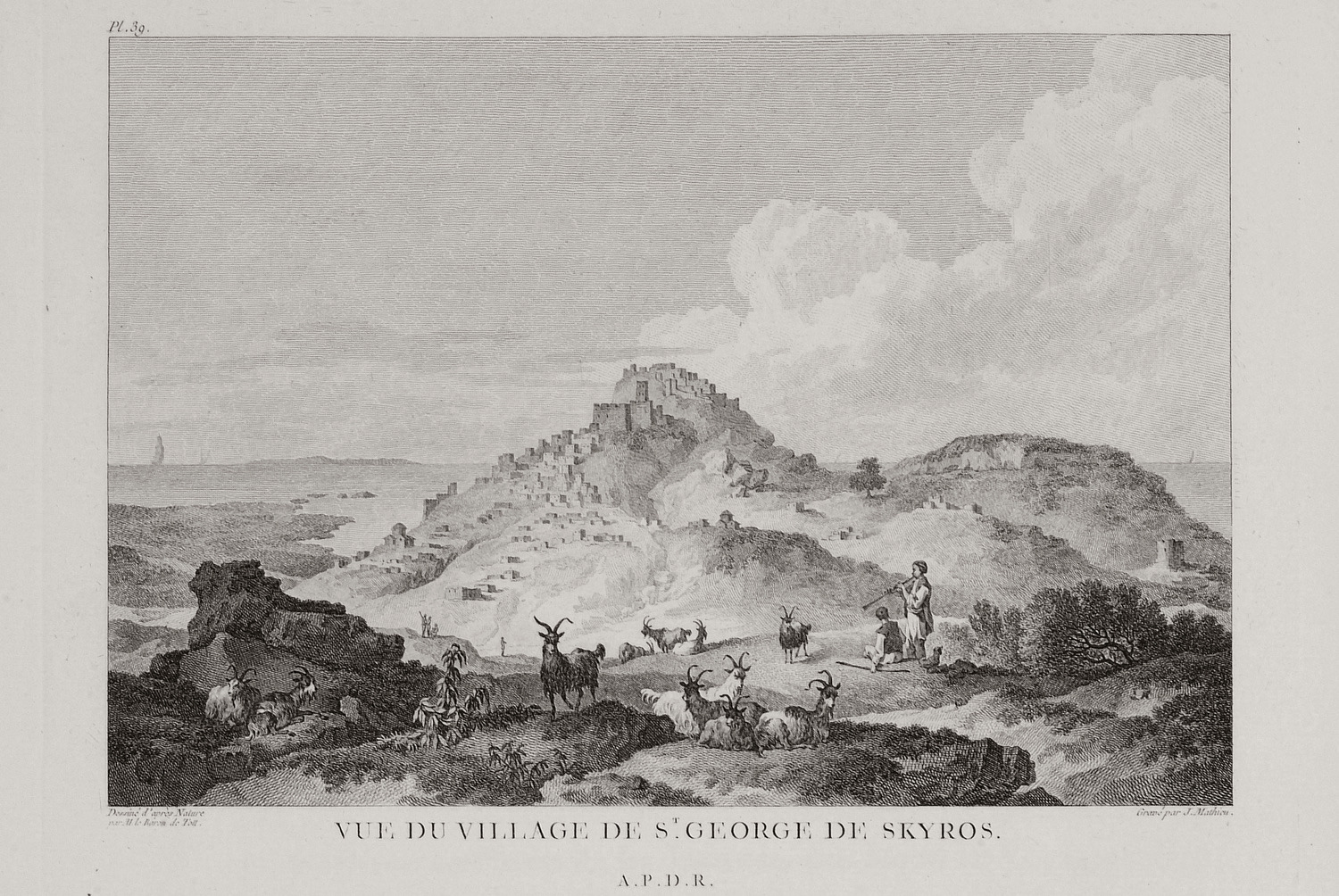
Skyros, 1782

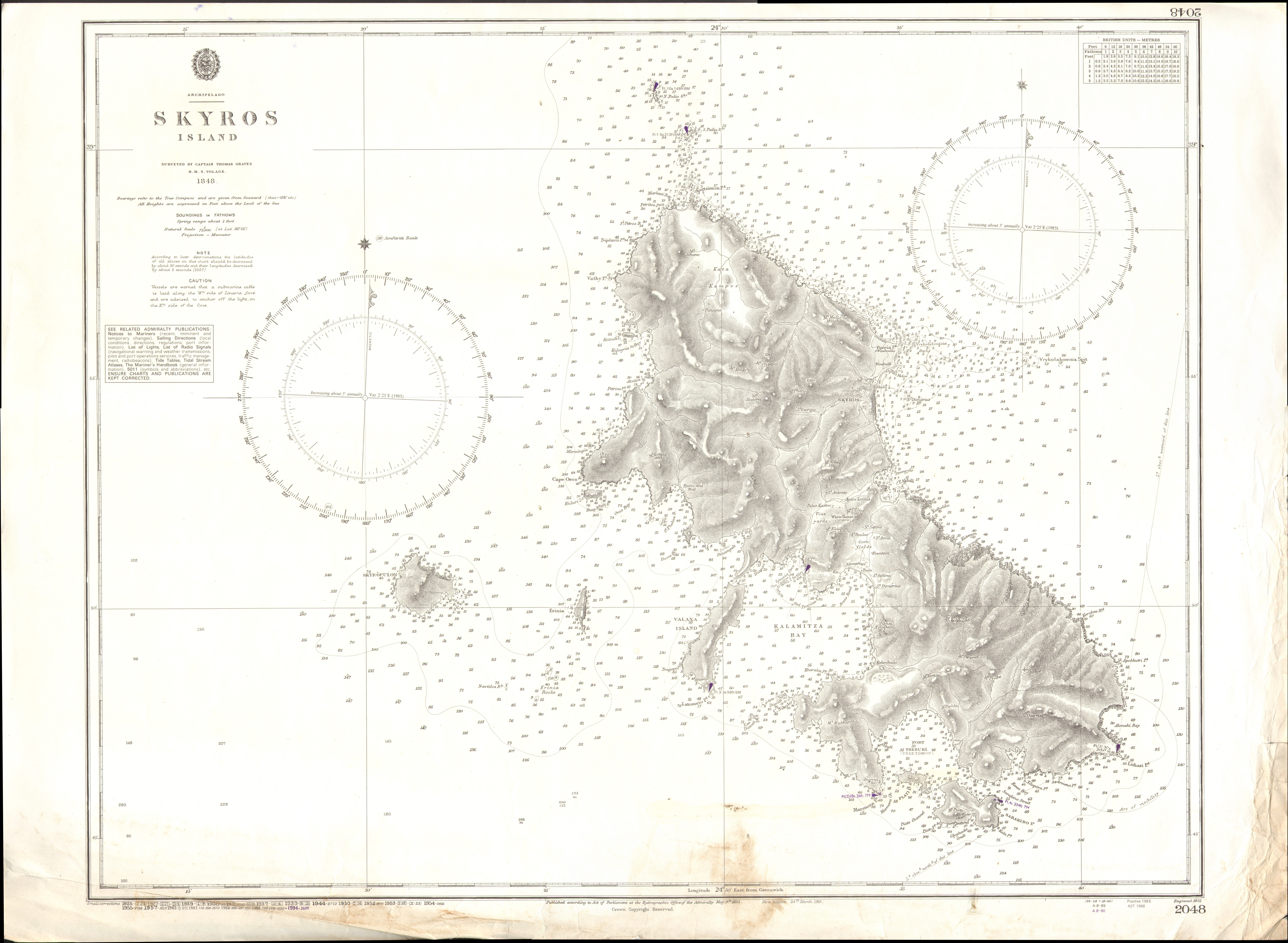
Admiralty Chart of Skyros, surveyed by Thomas Graves, Published 1851

After the Fourth Crusade of 1202–1204, the island became part of the domain of Geremia Ghisi. The Byzantines retook it in 1277. After the Fall of Constantinople, Venetians again ruled the island until 1538, when it passed to the Ottoman Empire. It became part of the new Greek state in 1830.

In 1848, Captain Thomas Graves surveyed Skyros for the British Admiralty in the frigate HMS Volage. He travelled around the island, and a record of his observations was published the following year.

Rupert Brooke, the famous English poet, is buried on Skyros, having died on board a French hospital-ship moored off the island on 23 April 1915, during World War I. Present at Brooke's burial that same evening, were Patrick Shaw-Stewart and William Denis Browne. The tomb that visitors see today when they visit the grave, which is located in the Tris Boukes Bay, is one that was commissioned by Brooke’s mother and was placed after the 1st World War. On the tomb is an inscription of Brooke's famous poem The Soldier.

In 1941 Pulitzer Prize-winning poet Karl Shapiro wrote the World War II poem Scyros, which he set on the island Skyros "because it was a tribute to and irony upon Rupert Brooke."

In 1963 the Archaeological Museum of Skyros was established, with the inauguration taking place 10 years later in 1973. The Faltaits Folklore Museum was founded in 1964 - one of the first local folklore museums to operate in Greece.

=== Spanish flu ===
In 1918, during the spanish flu, approximately one third of the island's population died in less than 30 days. Specifically, the influenza began on 27 October 1918, and of the 3,200 inhabitants on the island, almost 2,000 were infected and 1,000 died. Konstantinos Faltaits described the dire consequences of the pandemic in a rare chronicle published in 1919, titled Ἡ γρίππη στὴ Σκῦρο 'The flu in Skyros'.

== Geography ==
The north of the island is covered by a forest, while the south, dominated by the highest mountain, called Kochila, (792 m), is bare and rocky. The island's capital is also called Skyros (or, locally, Chora). The main port, on the west coast, is Linaria. The island has a castle (the kastro) that dates from the Venetian occupation (13th to 15th centuries), a Byzantine monastery (the Monastery of Saint George), the grave of English poet Rupert Brooke in an olive grove by the road leading to Tris Boukes harbour. There are many beaches on the coast. The island has its own breed of Skyrian ponies.

=== Climate ===
Skyros has a hot-summer Mediterranean climate (Csa) with mild to cool, rainy winters and pleasantly warm, dry summers.

Climate data for Skyros airport (1955-2010) HNMS
Month	Jan	Feb	Mar	Apr	May	Jun	Jul	Aug	Sep	Oct	Nov	Dec	Year
Mean daily maximum °C (°F)	12.3 (54.1)	12.7 (54.9)	14.1 (57.4)	17.7 (63.9)	22 (72)	26.3 (79.3)	27.9 (82.2)	27.6 (81.7)	24.7 (76.5)	20.8 (69.4)	17.2 (63.0)	13.9 (57.0)	19.8 (67.6)
Daily mean °C (°F)	9.9 (49.8)	10.1 (50.2)	11.6 (52.9)	15.0 (59.0)	19.3 (66.7)	23.8 (74.8)	25.6 (78.1)	25.3 (77.5)	22.2 (72.0)	18.3 (64.9)	14.6 (58.3)	11.6 (52.9)	17.3 (63.1)
Mean daily minimum °C (°F)	7.4 (45.3)	7.4 (45.3)	8.7 (47.7)	11.4 (52.5)	15.0 (59.0)	19.3 (66.7)	21.7 (71.1)	21.7 (71.1)	18.8 (65.8)	15.5 (59.9)	12.0 (53.6)	9.1 (48.4)	14.0 (57.2)
Average precipitation mm (inches)	70.6 (2.78)	55.3 (2.18)	49.9 (1.96)	24.3 (0.96)	15.4 (0.61)	6.5 (0.26)	5.9 (0.23)	8.4 (0.33)	19.4 (0.76)	36.7 (1.44)	54.6 (2.15)	81.1 (3.19)	428.1 (16.85)
Average precipitation days	12.9	10.4	9.8	7.6	5.2	2.7	1.6	1.6	3.7	7.0	9.1	13.0	84.6
Average relative humidity (%)	76.2	74.2	73.7	71.5	70.0	66.0	66.2	68.0	70.8	74.5	76.6	77.0	72.1
Source: HNMS (1955–2010 averages)

== Historical population ==
Year	Population
1981	2,757
1991	2,901
2001	2,602
2011	2,994
2021	3,052

== Transportation ==
=== Air travel ===
Skyros is home to the Skyros Island National Airport, a one-runway airport.

=== Sea travel ===
Skyros Shipping Company operates the ferry service to Skyros. During holiday season the ferry runs twice daily from Kymi to Linaria on Skyros. During the winter months the service operates daily. The ship has the name "Achilleas SKYROS SHIPPING CO." (Greek: Αχιλλέας ΣΚΥΡΟΣ ΝΑΥΤΙΚΗ ΕΤΑΙΡΙΑ).

== Gallery ==
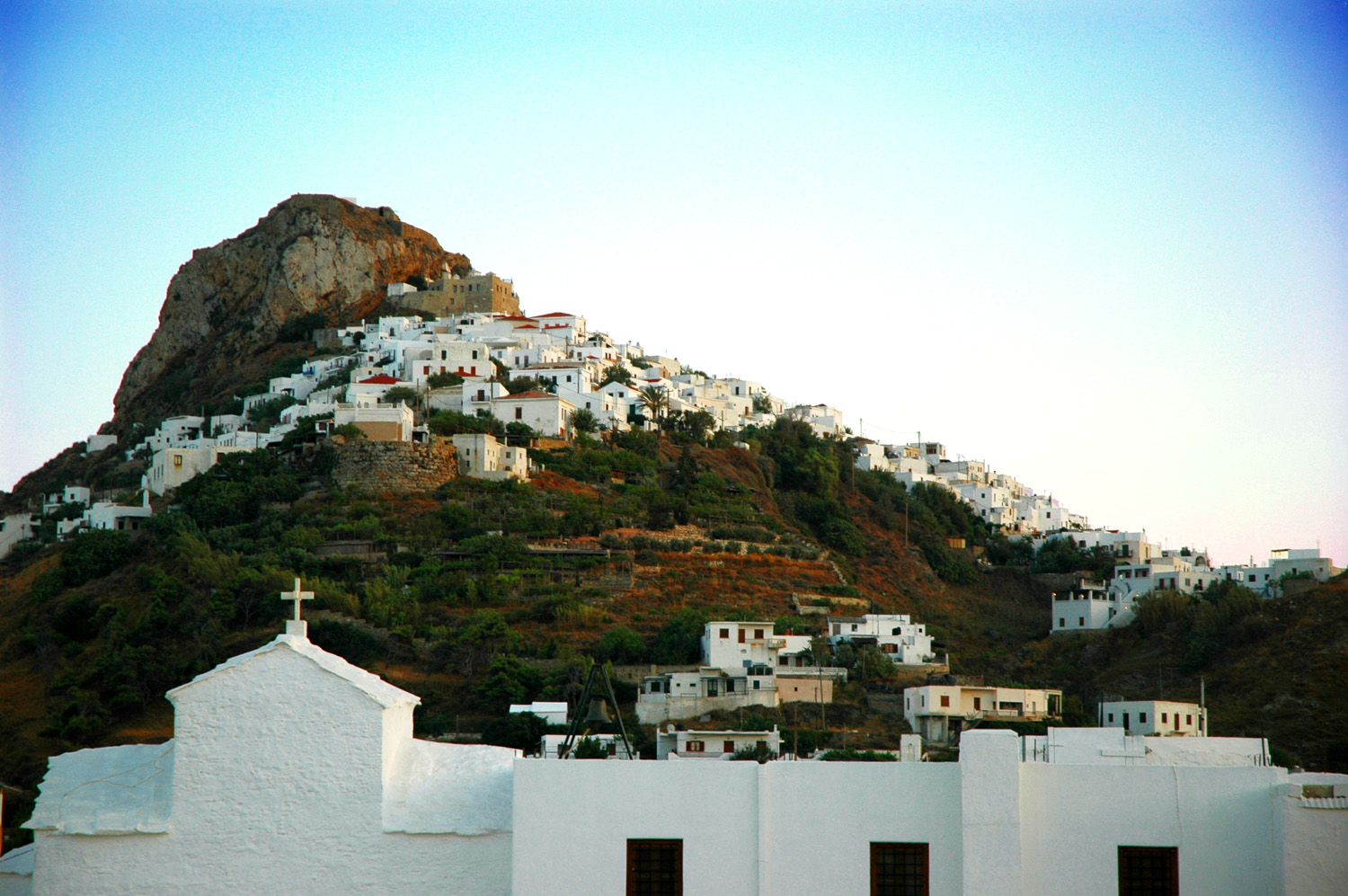
View of Chora

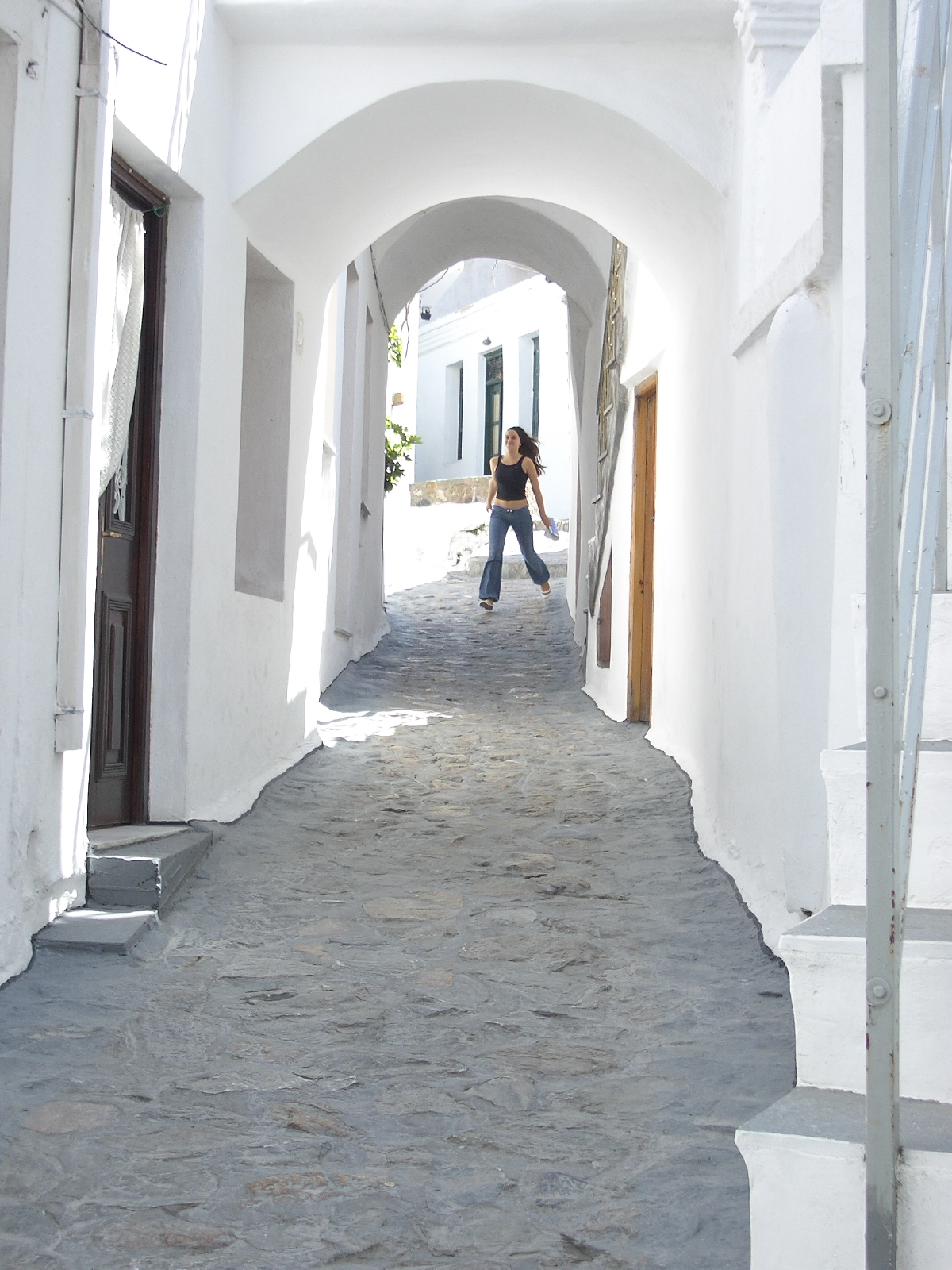
Street of Skyros

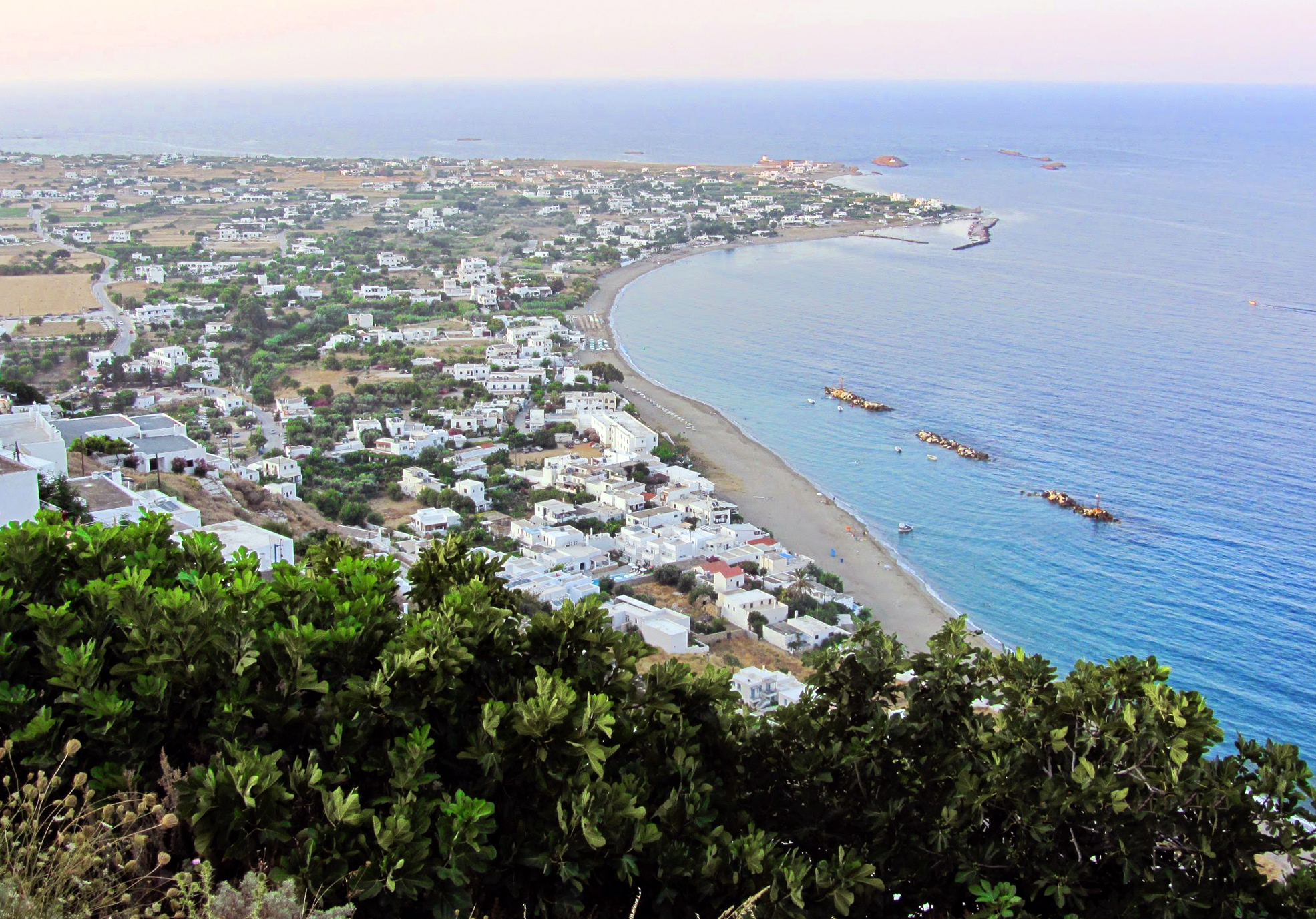
Aerial view

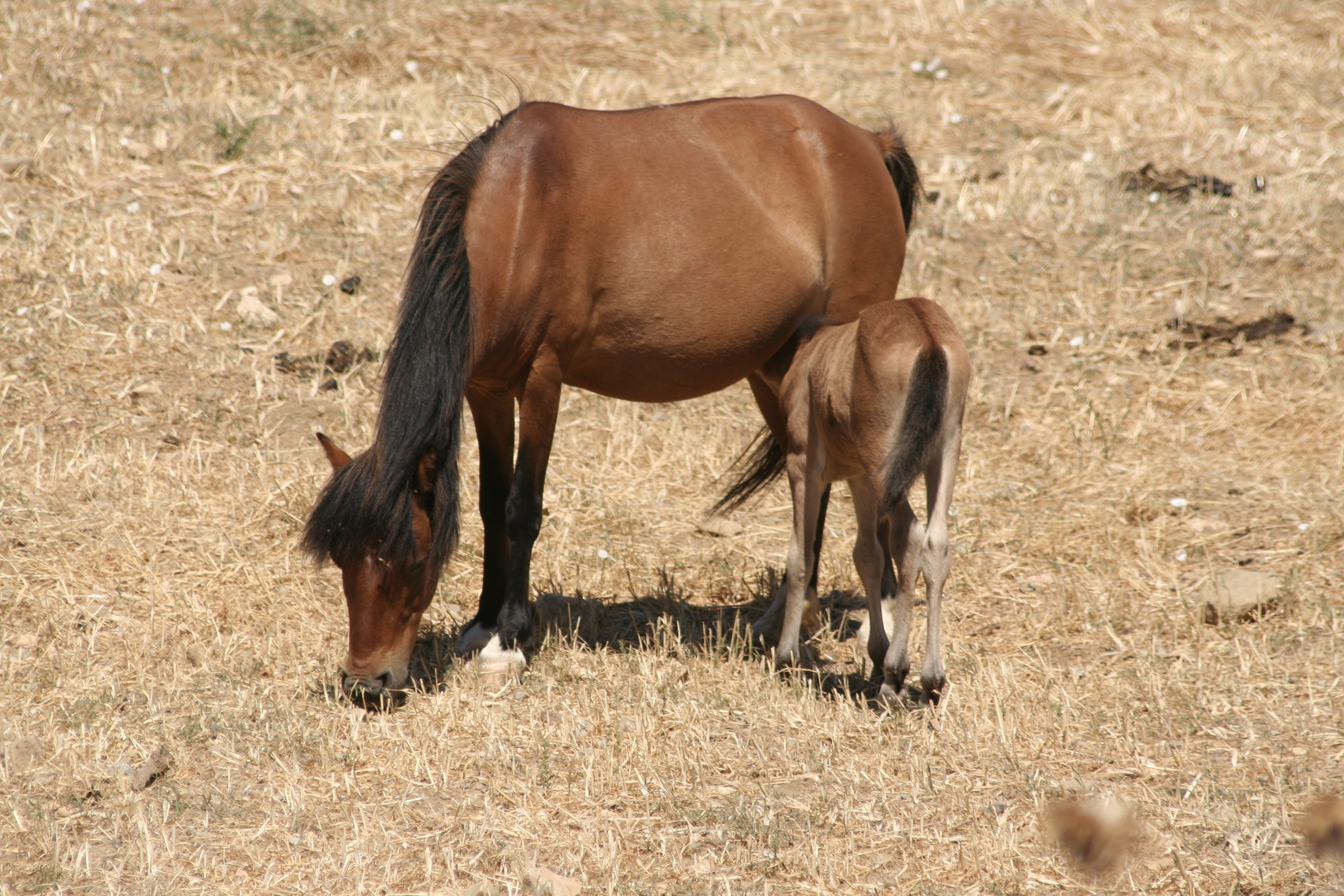
Skyros pony

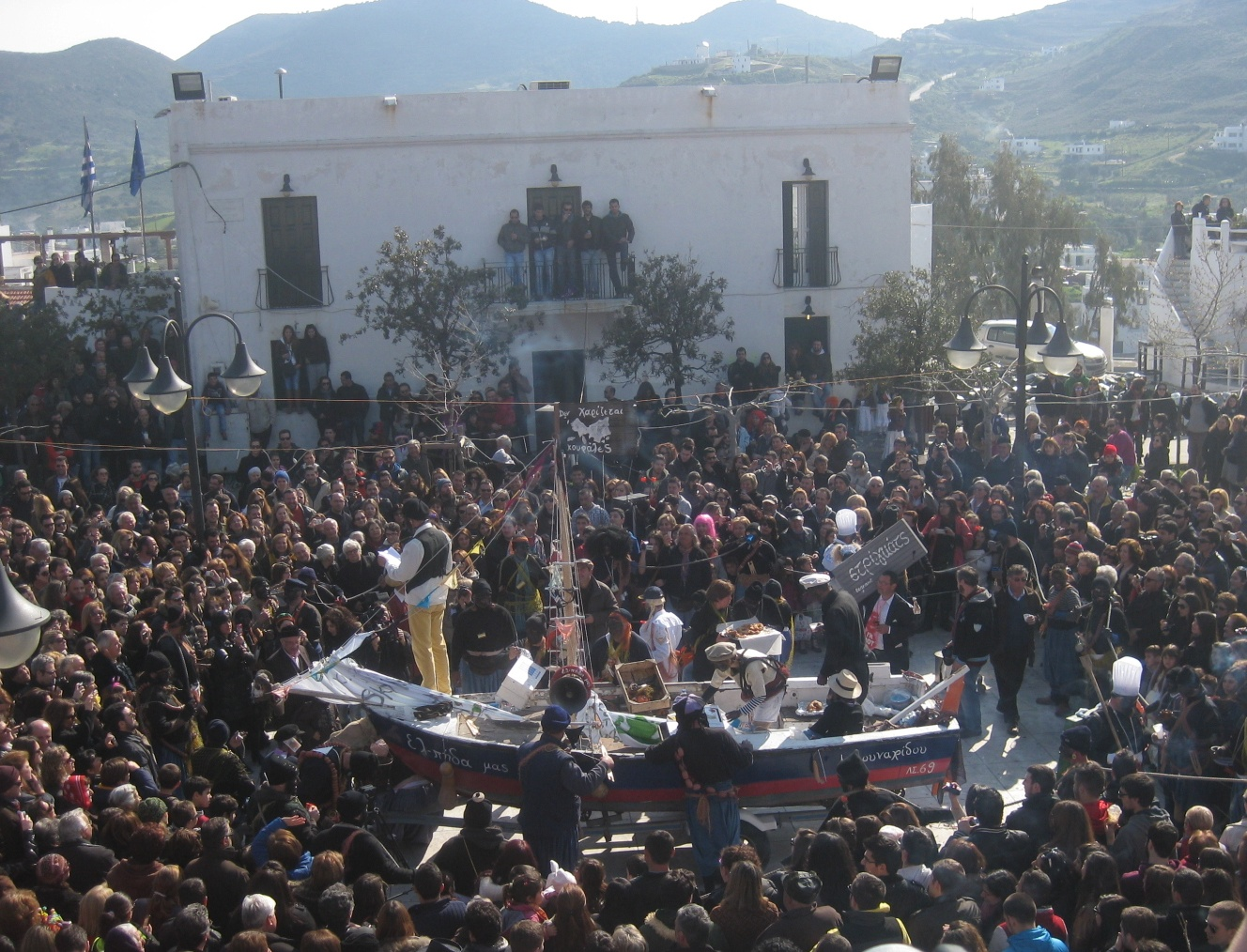
Fest during the carnival

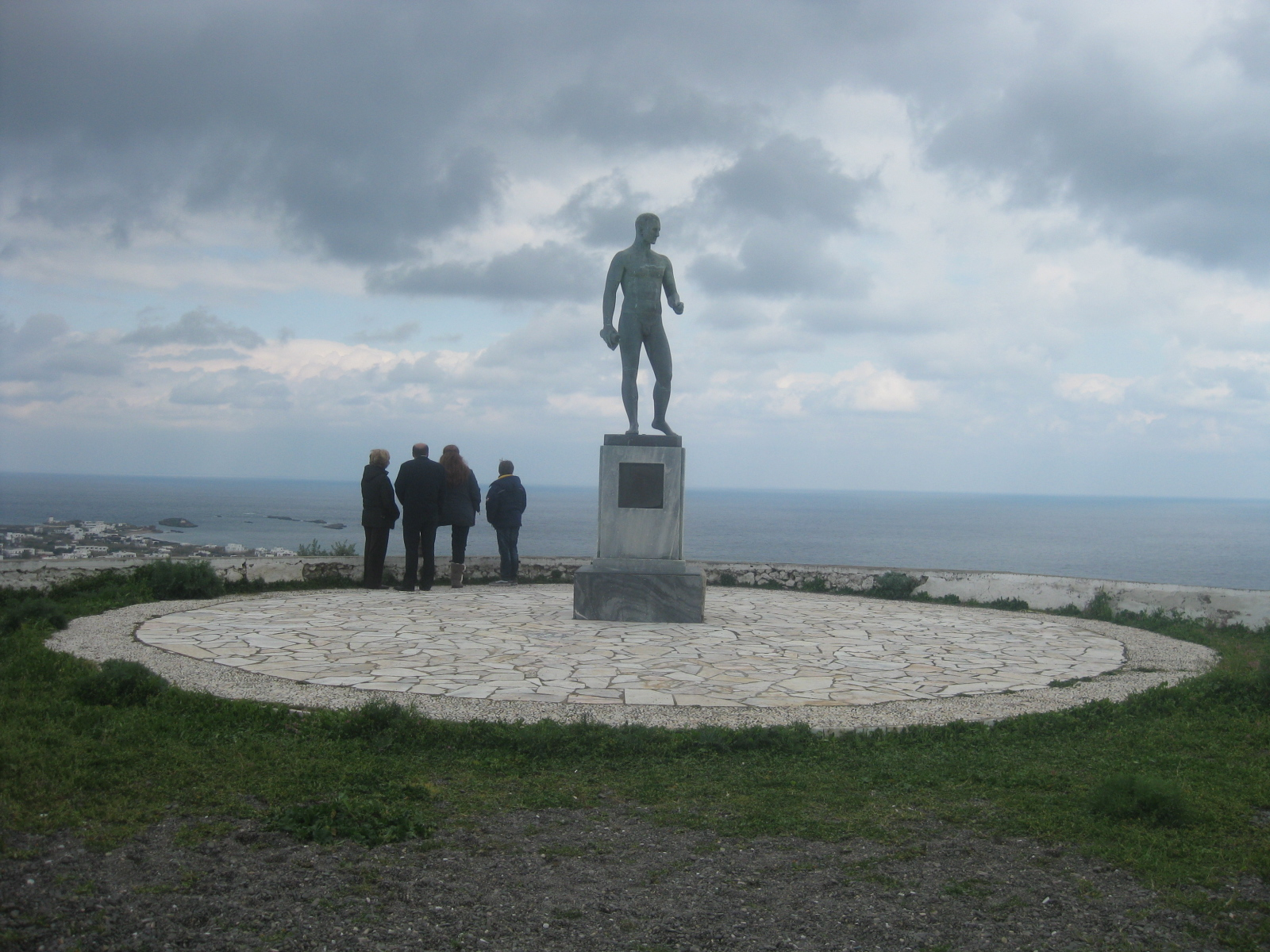
Brooke Square

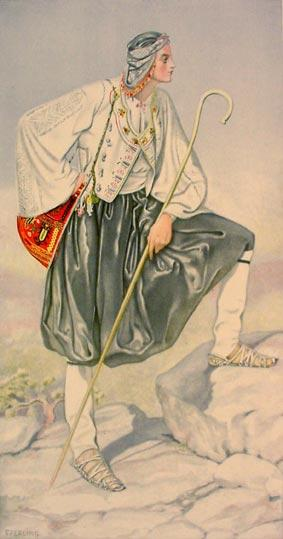
Traditional dress (Vraka) of Skyros

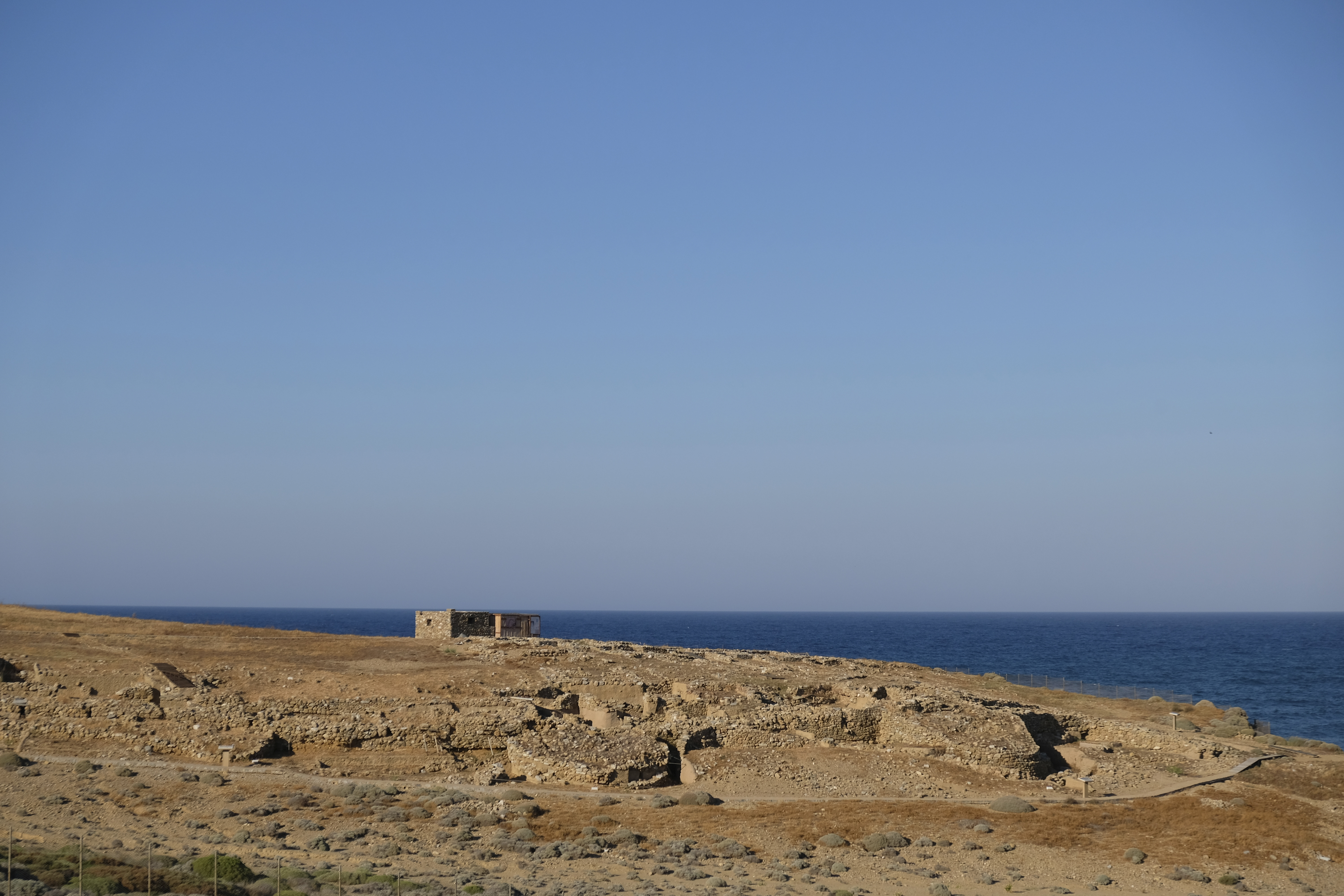
Archaeological Site of Palamari

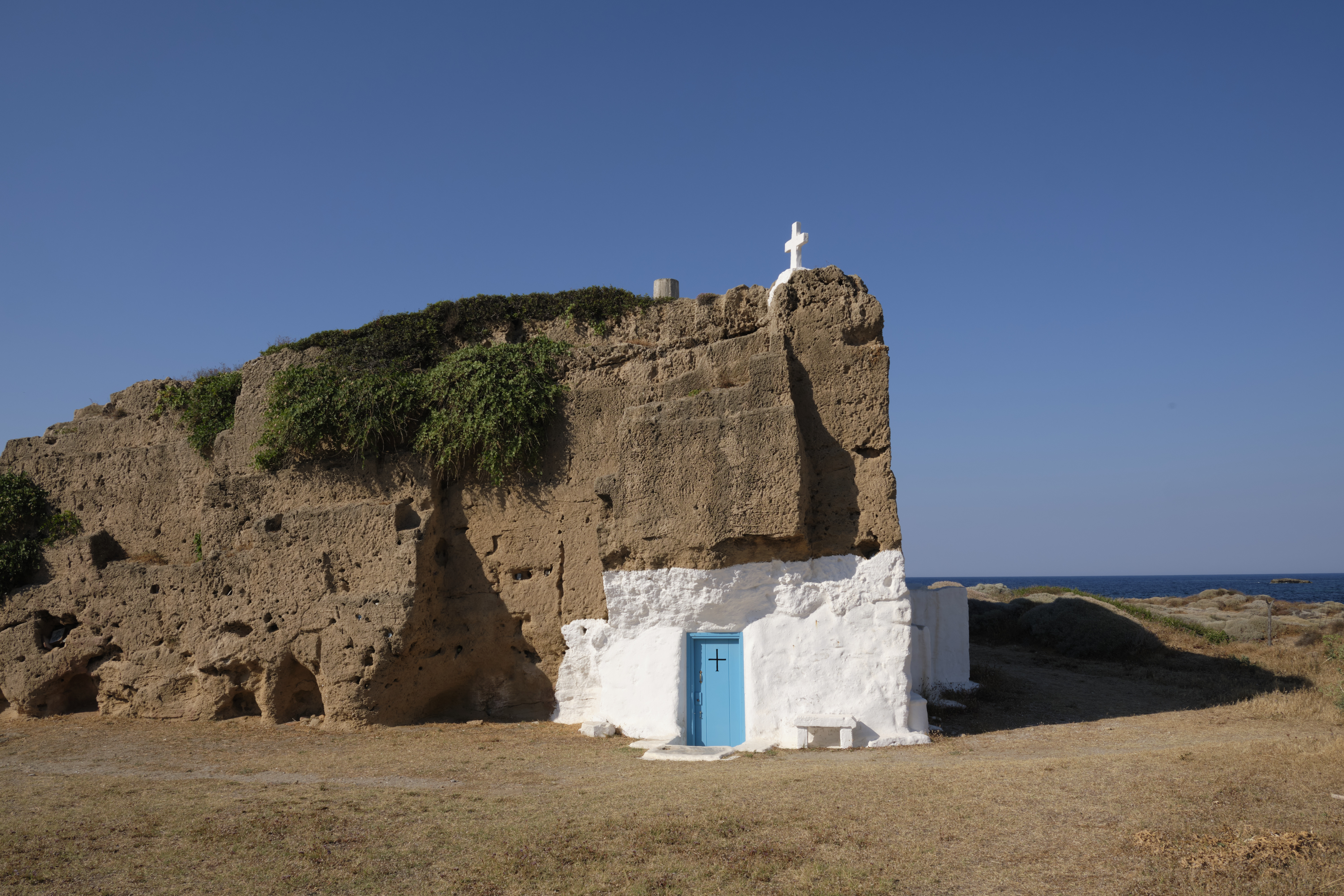
Agios Nikolaos Church in Molos

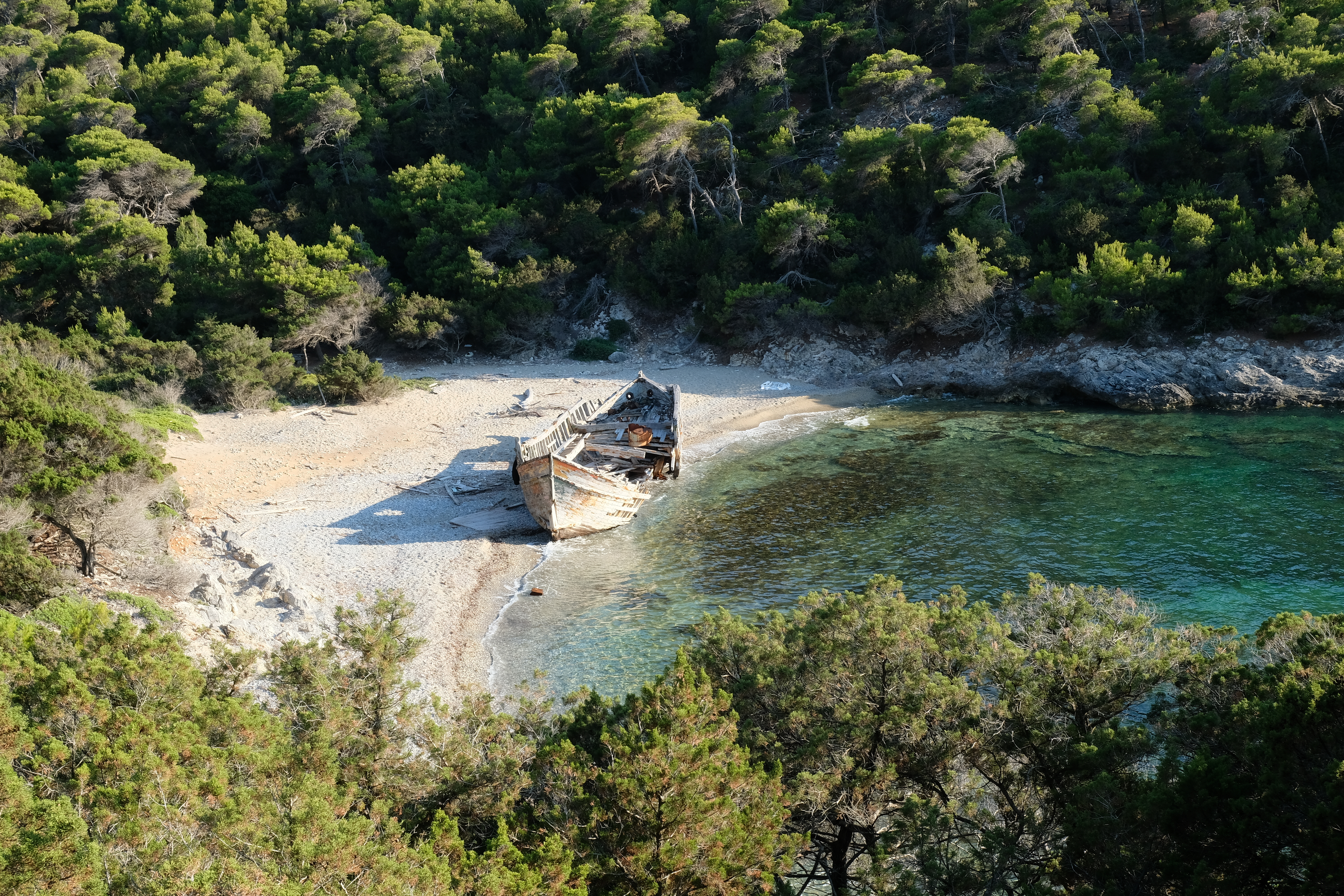
Shipwreck on Agalipas Beach
