= Ellopion =

Ellopion (Ancient Greek: Ἐλλόπιον) may refer to:

- Ellopion (Aetolia), a town of ancient Aetolia
- Ellopion of Peparethus, an ancient philosopher
