= Peristera shipwreck =

Historical shipwreck in Greece

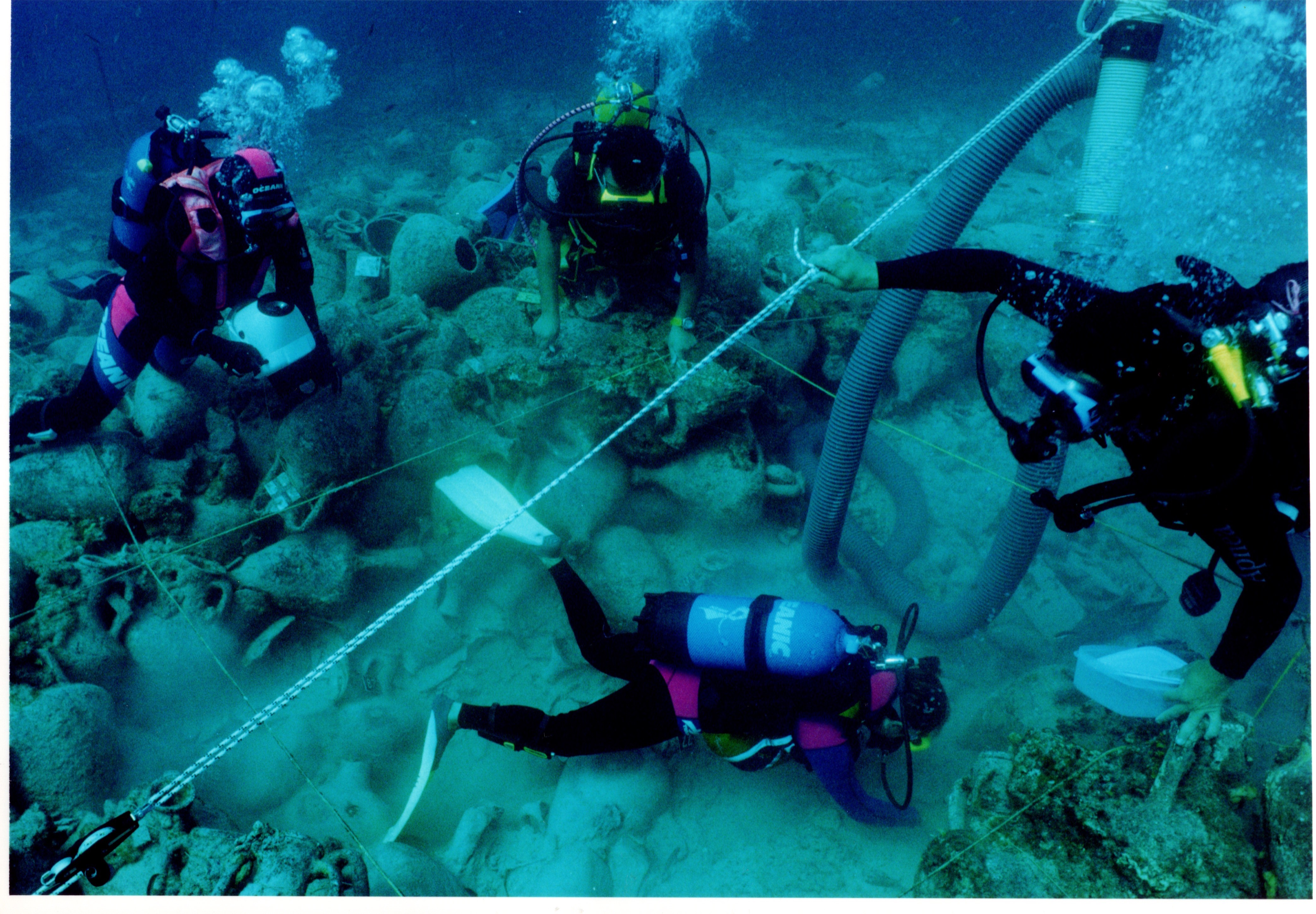
Excavation of the Peristera shipwreck in 2000

The Peristera shipwreck (Greek: Ναυάγιο Περιστέρας) is an underwater shipwreck of a 5th-century BC merchant vessel at a depth of 20 metres (66 ft), just off the islet of Peristera near Alonissos. Its cargo of 3000-4000 amphoras made it the largest transport ship yet known of its period when excavation began in 1992, and it carried wine from Mende and Skopelos. In addition to amphoras, the ship transported many valuable items including black-glazed cups, plates and bronze tableware. The site was opened to the public for scuba diving visits as the Alonissos Underwater Museum (Υποθαλάσσιο Μουσείο Αλοννήσου) in 2020, the first such underwater museum in Greece.

== Discovery ==
In 1982, Greek diver and fisherman Dimitrios Mavrikis with his son Kostas discovered a large Classical-era shipwreck near the islet of Peristera at Alonnisos in the Northern Sporades. and declared it to the Ephorate of Underwater Antiquities. Department personnel conducted a survey in 1991 under the director of the department, Elpida Hadjidaki. The wreck was marked by thousands of amphorae forming a mound 25 by 23 metres (82 ft × 75 ft) and clearly indicating the shape of the ship. The upper layer was jumbled, but the lower layer appeared relatively undisturbed. The size of the mound indicated that this shipwreck was twice as large as any other shipwreck of the Classical period discovered at that time.

Three of the amphorae were recovered for examination. They dated to the last quarter of the 5th century BC, and were identified as wine amphorae from Mende and Skopelos.

== Excavation ==
Systematic excavation of the shipwreck began in 1992, again led by the director of the Ephorate of Underwater Antiquities. The first task was a survey of the existing state of the wreck, and this was done by preparing a photomosaic from photographs taken at a height of 7 metres (23 ft) above the wreck. Next, the wreck was covered by a rope grid 24 m × 12 m (79 ft × 39 ft) in extent that divided the region under investigation into 2 m × 2 m (6.6 ft × 6.6 ft) sections.

Excavation began in one of the sections near the western end of the mound. Nineteen amphoras were recovered from the top layer in this section, and another nineteen from a second layer beneath the first.

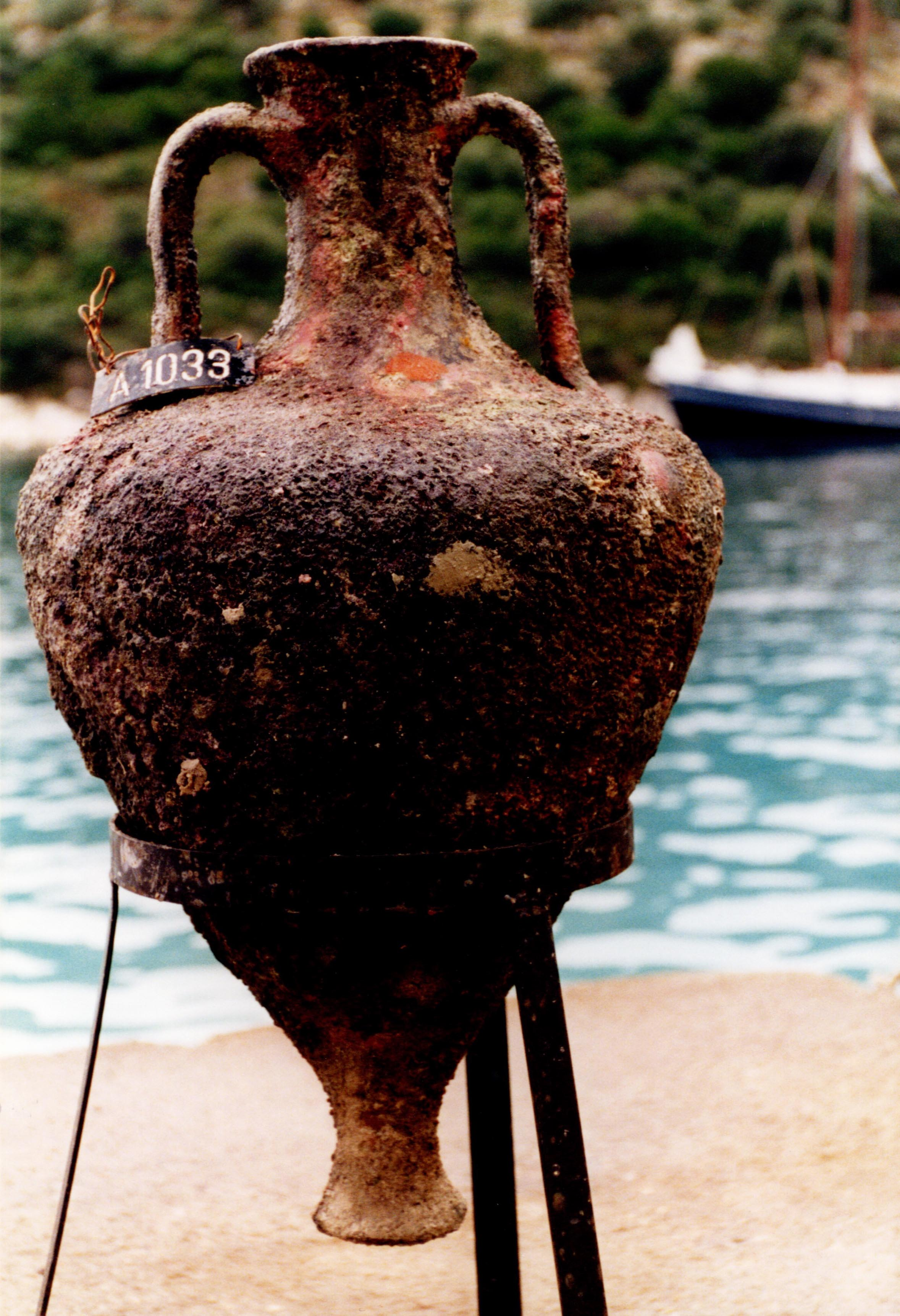
Wine amphora from Mende recovered from the shipwreck

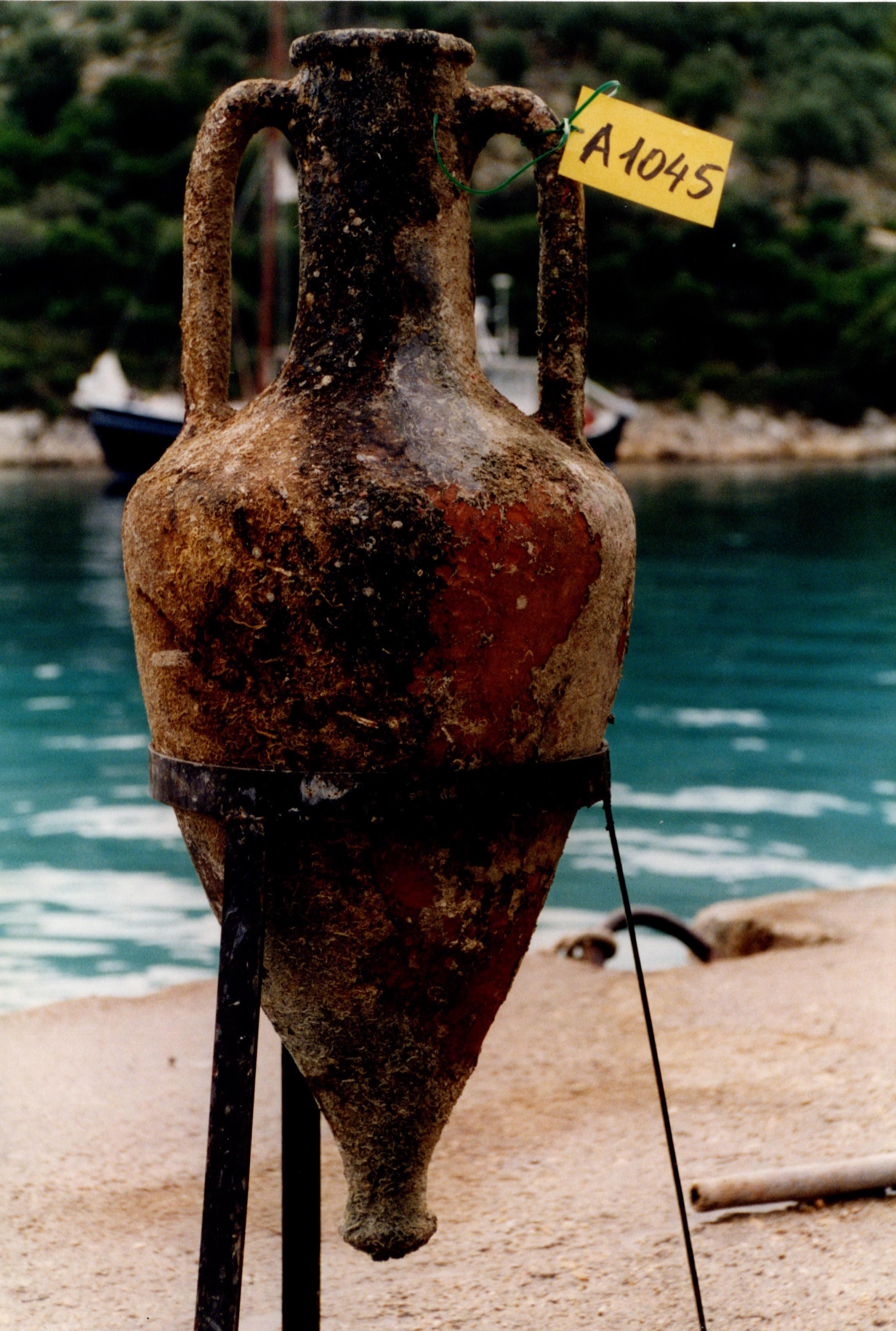
Wine amphora from ancient Peparethos (Skopelos) recovered from the shipwreck

Underneath was a third layer with an additional 27 amphoras, and beneath them 35 additional artifacts including black-glazed bowls, cups, plates, and elegant bronze tableware.

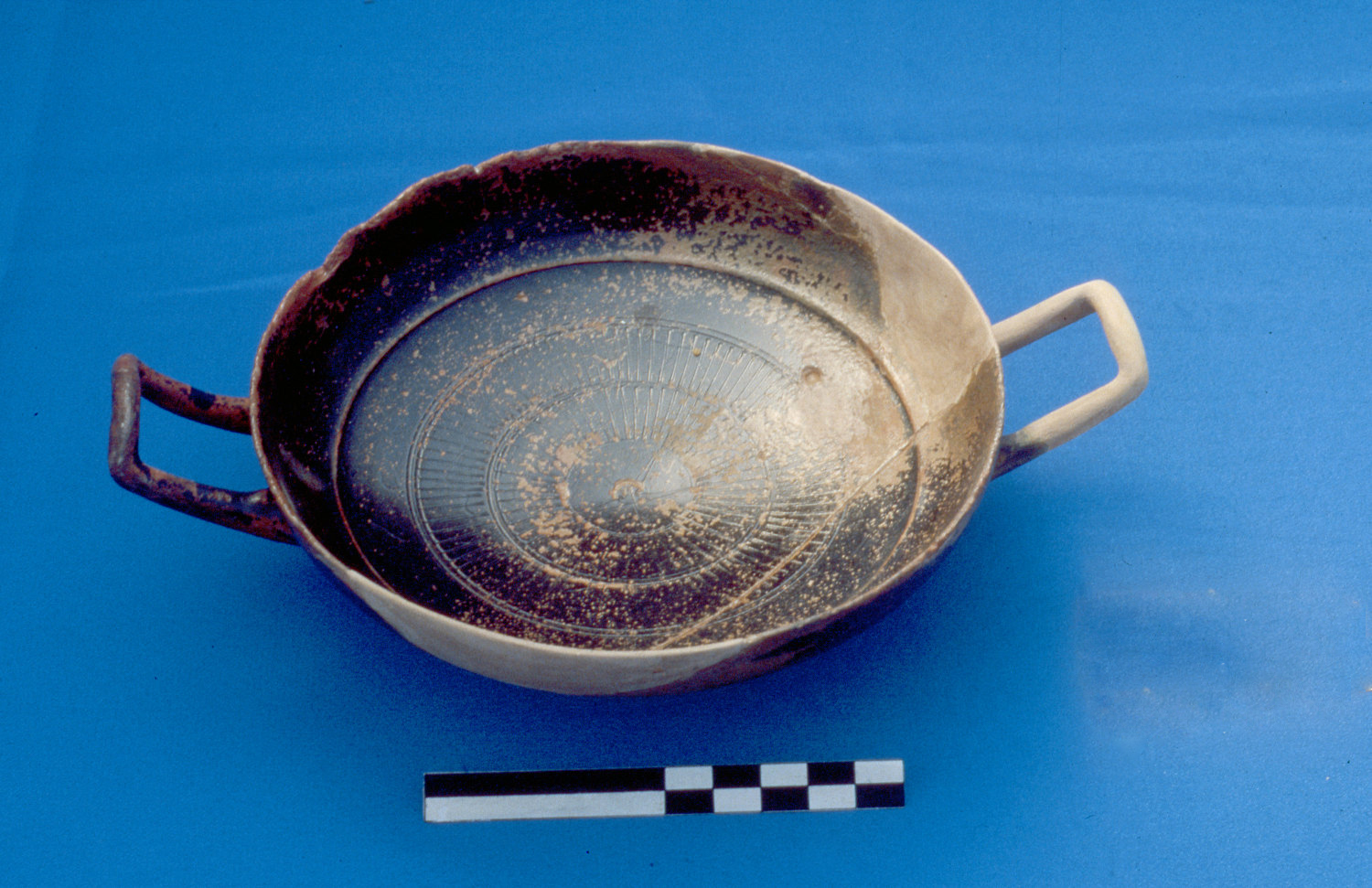
Black glazed stemless cup (kylix) from the shipwreck

The bulk of the amphoras come from Mende and Skopelos, ancient Peparethos, and a smaller number originated at Ikos, Chios, and Kerkyra. All artifacts, including amphoras, cups, and bowls, date to the late fifth century BC.

Excavation resumed in the summer of 1993, in a second section adjacent to the first. This contained 68 amphoras in four layers, under which were additional artifacts, ballast stones, and chunks of wood. In 1999 in a third section was excavated, and an additional 80 amphoras were obtained, as well as objects belonging to the crew such as oil lamps, table amphoras, and mortars.

In 2000, three additional sections were excavated. Hundreds of additional amphoras were found, but they were not all brought to the surface. Of greater interest were 82 pieces of wood found at the lowest excavation layers. Although none of them were more than a few centimeters in extent, they provided the first evidence for the ship construction. Fourteen of the pieces were treenails, around 7 centimetres (2.8 in) in diameter, within which were large copper nails.

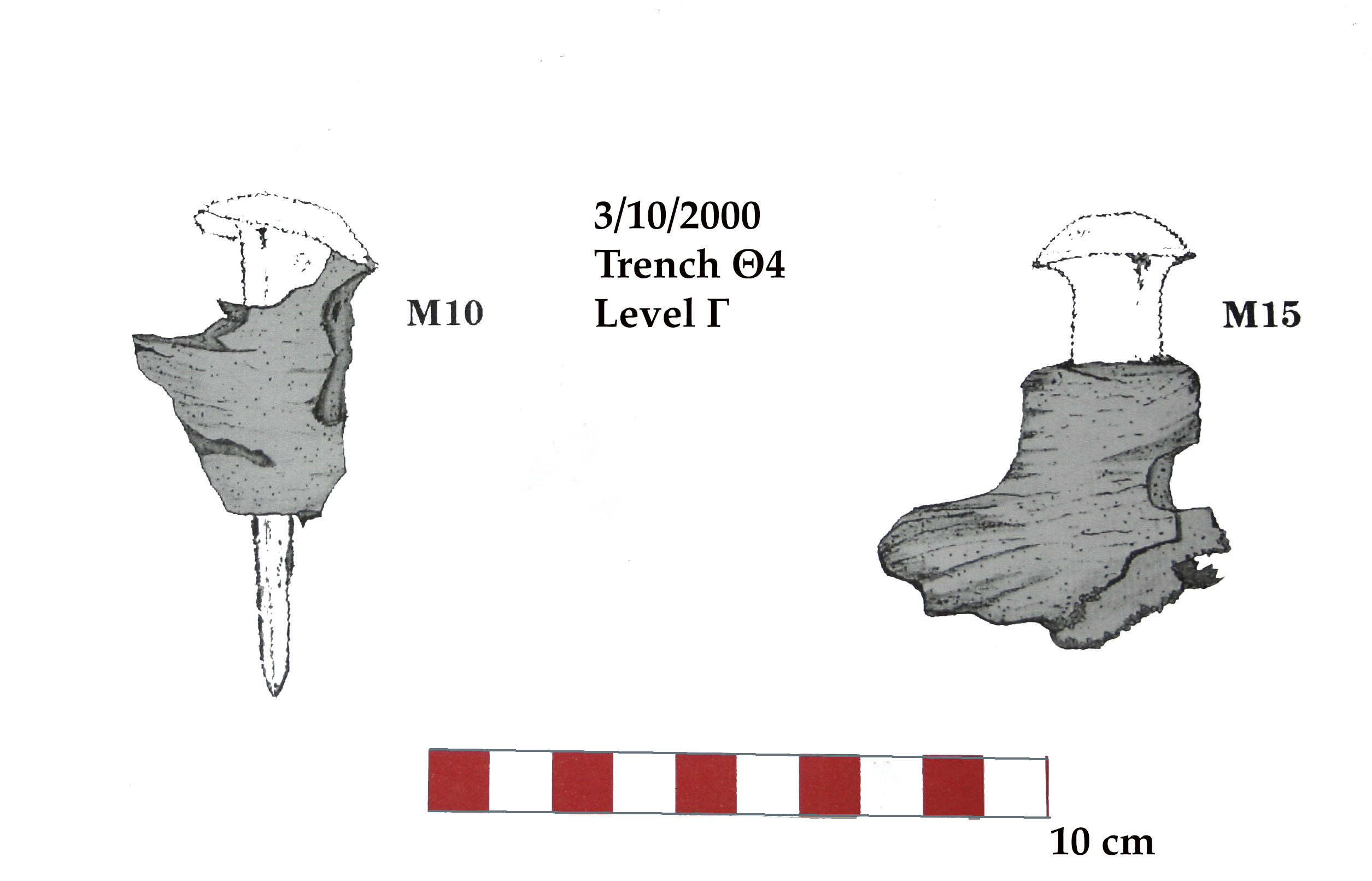
Treenails from the shipwreck

Fragments of wooden planks from the ship's hull showed them to be 8 centimetres (3.1 in) in thickness.

== Significance ==
A conservative estimate of the cargo of the shipwreck indicates that it carried 4200 amphoras, with a weight of 126 metric tons. The length of the hull was 25–30 m (82–98 ft). This makes it considerably larger than the shipwrecks from other Classical shipwrecks such as Kyrenia, Porticello, or Ma'agan Michael. Thus, we have a conclusive proof that the Greeks constructed ships capable of carrying burdens up to 150 metric tons from the fifth century BC onwards, something previously thought to only have been possible during the Roman period.

== Underwater Museum ==
The marine area surrounding the Alonnisos shipwreck is protected as part of the Alonnisos Marine Park. The area immediately surrounding the shipwreck was opened to the public for scuba diving visits as the Alonissos Underwater Museum (Υποθαλάσσιο Μουσείο Αλοννήσου) in 2020.

The Information Center of the Alonissos Underwater Museum also offers a simulated 'diving' experience of the site using virtual reality in partnership with the European Commission. Positioning of the many vessels, pots, and amphoras are mapped in 3D for visitors to 'navigate' the seabed.
