= Glossa, Skopelos =

Glossa Γλώσσα
- Community
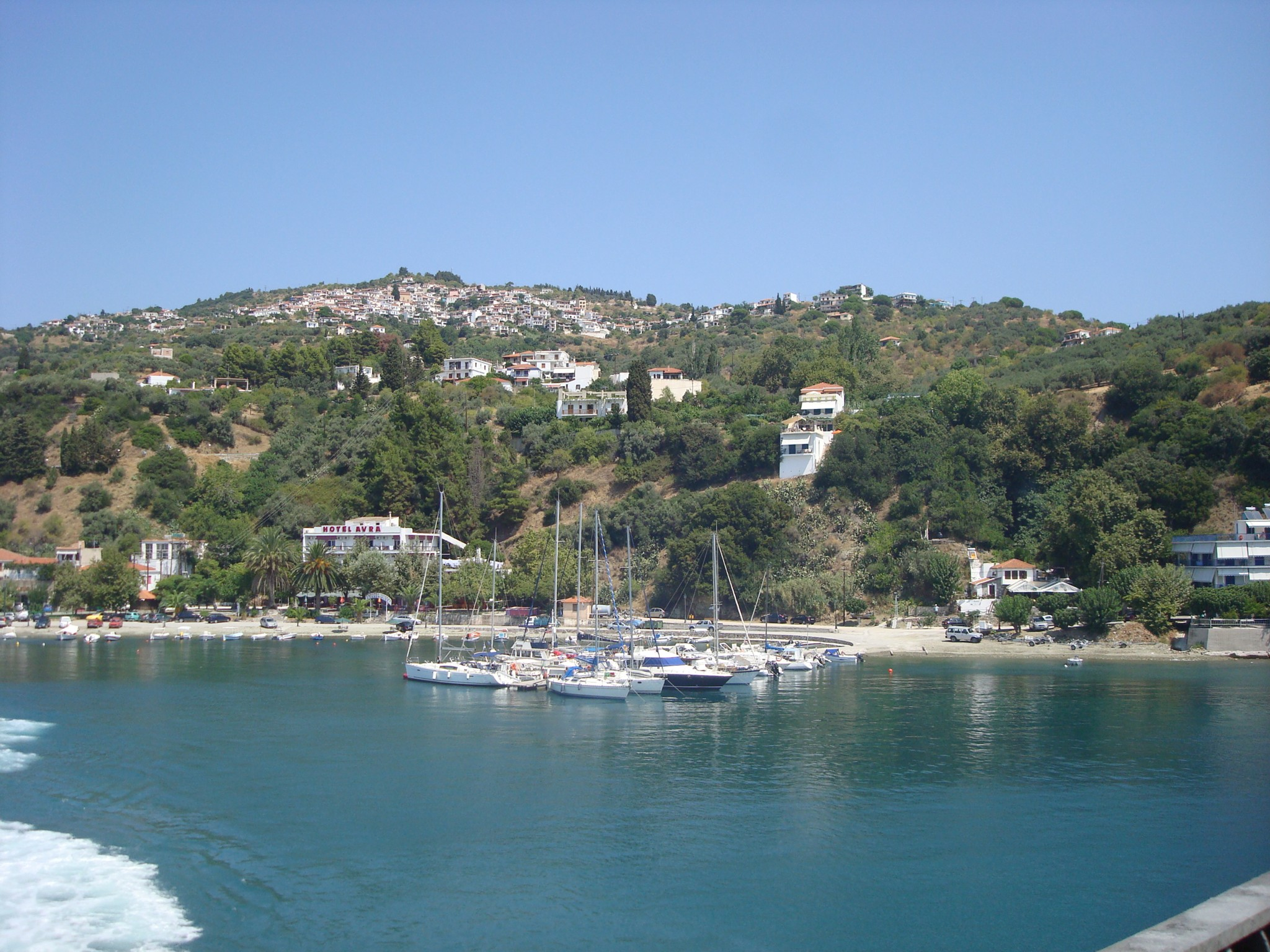
- Glossa

- Location within Greece
- Coordinates: 39°11′N 23°37′E
- Country: Greece
- Administrative region: Thessaly
- Regional unit: Sporades
- Municipality: Skopelos
- Elevation: 209 m (686 ft)

Population (2021)
  - Community: 970
- Time zone: UTC+2 (EET)
  - Summer (DST): UTC+3 (EEST)
- Postal code: 370 04
- Area code: 24240
- Vehicle registration: ΒΟ

Glossa (Greek: Γλώσσα meaning "tongue") is a village and a community in the northwestern part of the island of Skopelos in the Northern Sporades. The population in 2021 was 970 for the community, which includes the villages Atheato and Loutraki. The town's elevation is about 200 meters. Glossa is located 11 km northwest of Skopelos (town).

In 1960, Glossa opened a public primary school, a telephone centre and had 1,842 inhabitants. Before the reorganization of the island government in 1997, Glossa and Klima constituted separate communities from Skopelos. Currently Glossa has nursery, primary, secondary and high school. There are also several churches, including the chapel of Agios Ioannis, featured in the 2008 film Mamma Mia!.

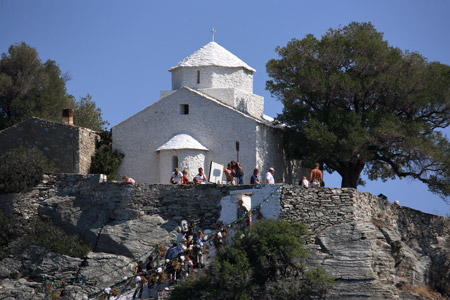
The Agios Ioannis chapel during filming of the wedding scene for Mamma Mia!.
