= Hagnon =

People with the name of Hagnon or Agnon (in Greek: Ἅγνων) include:

- Hagnon of Peparethus (6th century BC), ancient Greek athlete, victor in the stadion race of the 53rd Olympiad (568 BC)
- Hagnon, son of Nikias (5th century BC), Athenian general and statesman
- Hagnon of Tarsus (2nd century BC), ancient Greek rhetorician and philosopher
- Shmuel Yosef Agnon (1888–1970), Nobel Prize laureate writer of modern Hebrew fiction
