= Ephorate of Underwater Antiquities =

Greek governmental agency for underwater archaeology

The Ephorate of Underwater Antiquities (Greek: Εφορεία Εναλίων Αρχαιοτήτων, romanized: Eforeía Enalíon Archaiotíton) is a department within the Greek Ministry of Culture responsible for underwater archaeology.

== History ==
The Ephorate was founded in 1976, and has jurisdiction over the entirety of Greece (unlike the regional antiquities ephorates). Permission from the EUA is needed to conduct surveys and photography dives on architectural structures, such as shipwrecks, in Greek waters. The EUA itself is also responsible for the discovery, exploration, and maintenance of underwater activities.

The Ephorate operates two regional offices, based in Thessaloniki and Heraklion.

In 2003, the Ephorate was given jurisdiction over all wrecks of ships and aircraft more than fifty years old.

A Museum of Underwater Antiquities is currently being designed, under the auspices of the EUA. It will be situated in the harbour of Piraeus, and is projected to be completed in 2025.

== Excavations by the Ephorate ==
- The 5th-century BC Peristera shipwreck near Alonnisos, begun in 1992
- The port of the ancient city of Abdera in Thrace
- The port of the ancient city of Toroni in Chalcidice
- The port of the ancient city of Phalasarna in Crete
- The wreck of the French ship of the line Thérèse, sunk off Heraklion in 1669
- The wreck of an early modern merchant ship near Zakynthos
- Attempts to locate warships sunk during the Battle of Actium in 31 BC
- The port and parts of the settlement of the ancient city of Anactorium, near Vonitsa
- The port of Vathy in Samos
- The ancient city of Methone in southern Messenia
