= French ship Thérèse =

Many ships of the French Navy have been named Thérèse including :

- Thérèse launched in 1665 and lost in 1669
- Thérèse acquired in 1799 and captured and burnt in 1800
