= Stafylos =

Village on the island of Skopelos, Greece

Stafylos (Greek: Στάφυλος) is a village on the island Skopelos, Sporades islands, Greece. It lies within the region of Thessaly. It is located 4 kilometres south of the main town Skopelos. The area of Stafylos includes a bay and hotels and is accessible by local bus, private car, or on foot. Because of its beauty and proximity to the town, the beach at Staphylos is one of the most popular on the island and so it is often very crowded.

This bay owes its name to the Minoan King Staphylus whose ships are supposed to have landed in this cove. A Bronze Age tomb was discovered on the point of land between Stafylos beach and Velanio.
