= Agnontas =

Beach village on the Greek island of Skopelos

Coordinates: 39.085°N 23.709°E

Agnontas (Greek: Αγνώντας) is a beach village with a small port located on the Greek island of Skopelos. Its population is 11 (2021). Agnontas is the alternative port for ferryboats and passenger hydrofoils when bad weather closes the main port of the town of Skopelos. Hagnon of Peparethus was an athlete from Skopelos, a champion of the Ancient Olympic Games in 568 BC. It is said that on his victorious return to Skopelos his ship landed in this port. His fellow islanders named the harbor in his honor.
