= Adrines =

Group of beaches

Coordinates: 39.1124°N 23.6532°E

Adrines is the name given to three small beaches in the bay of Panormos on the island of Skopelos. The local legend is that Adrina, a pirate queen, drowned herself there.
