= Elpida Hadjidaki =

Greek archaeologist

- Born: Chania, Crete, Greece
- Other name: Elpida Hadjidaki-Marder
- Occupations: Marine archaeologist, director of the Greek Department of Maritime Antiquities
- Known for: First archaeologist to excavate the Peristera shipwreck; the first Minoan shipwreck; excavating Phalasarna
- Notable work: The Classical and Hellenistic Harbor at Phalasarna: A Pirate's Port? (1988); The Minoan Shipwreck at Pseira, Crete (2021)
- Spouse: Michael Marder
- Children: Nike Marder

Elpida Hadjidaki or Chatzidaki (Greek: Ελπίδα Χατζηδάκη) is a Greek marine archaeologist specializing in ancient shipwrecks and harbor towns. She grew up in coastal Chania and was interested in maritime history from an early age. Hadjidaki learned to dive shortly after finishing high school. She has investigated multiple archaeological sites, including the Peristera shipwreck, a Minoan shipwreck near Pseira, and the ancient harbor town of Phalasarna.

She was friends with Honor Frost, a now deceased diver and underwater archaeologist.

== Archaeological work ==
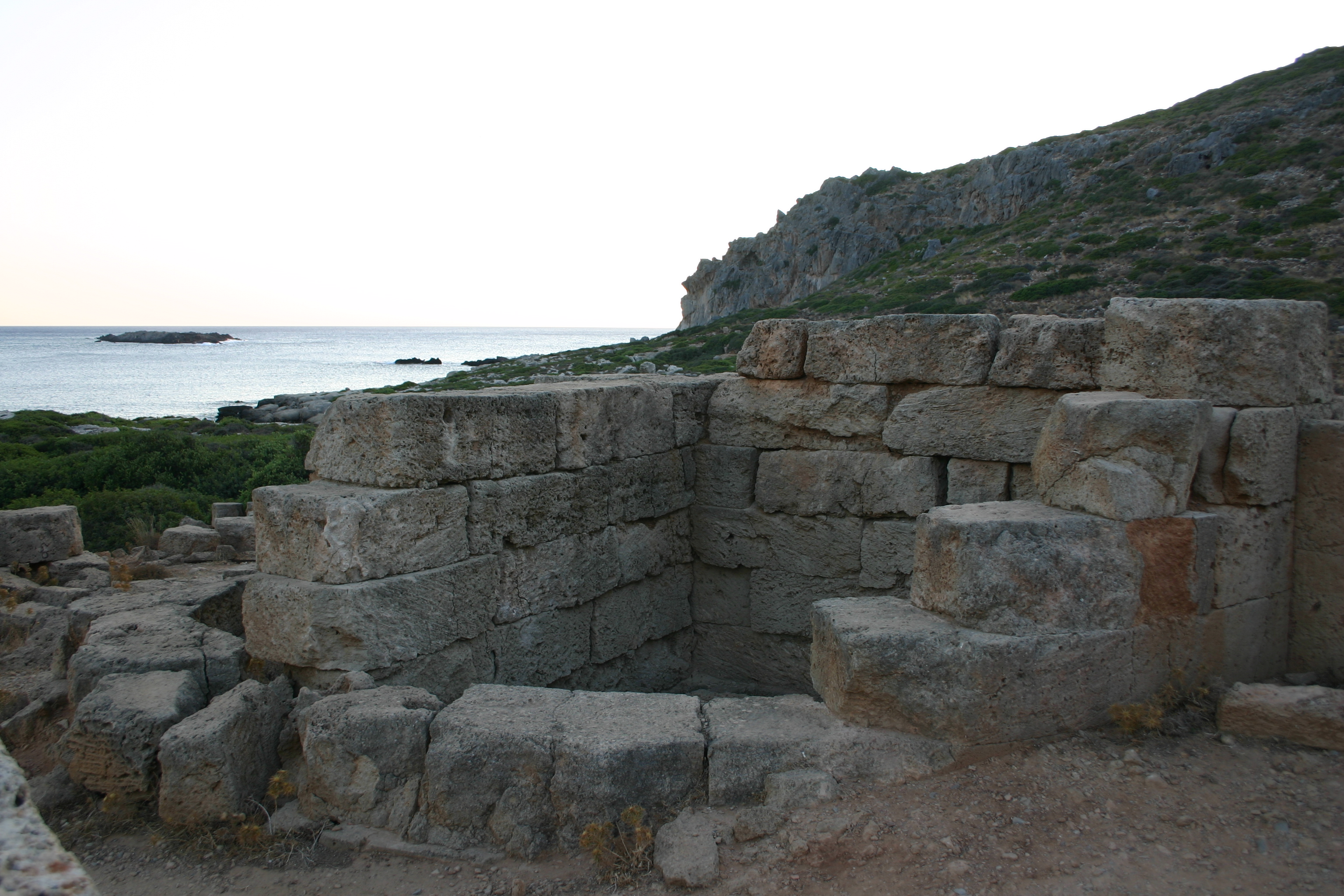
Round tower found in Phalasarna, photographed by Hadjidaki

Beginning in 1986, Elpida Hadjidaki and her crew began exploring Phalasarna, an ancient harbor town. Phalasarna may have participated in piracy in the Hellenistic period. Hadjidaki excavated multiple towers, fortification walls, commercial buildings, quays, a slipway and a cistern in the town, finding shards of amphorae, weapons, and pottery. Phalasarna was a heavily fortified, independent town which minted its own coins.

In 1992, Hadjidaki led a team of archaeologists to explore the Peristera shipwreck, found off an islet near Alonnisos. While she didn't discover the wreck—a local fisherman did—her team was the first to fully examine it.

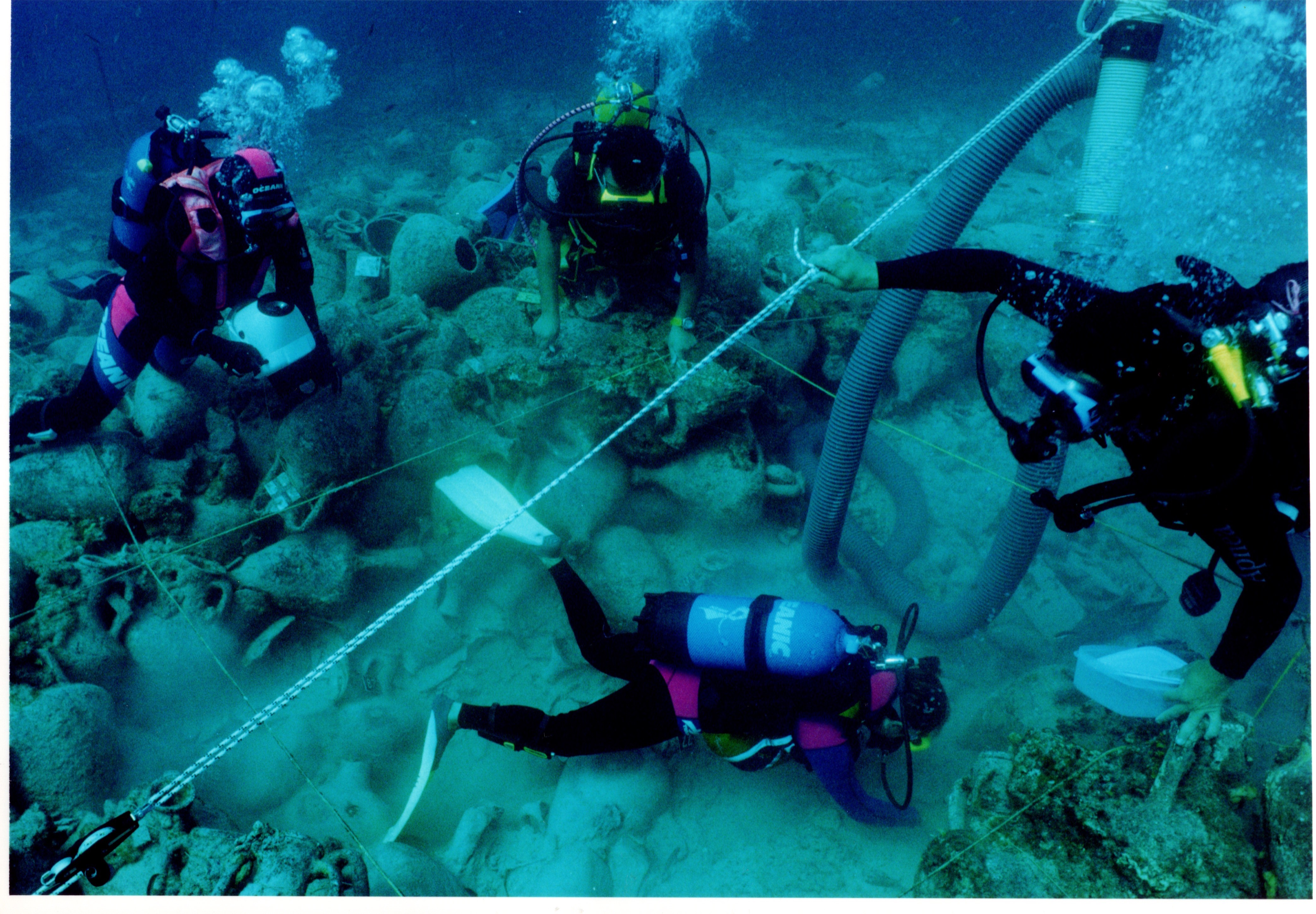
Excavation of the Peristera shipwreck, photographed by Hadjidaki

Hadjidaki and her coworkers found over a thousand amphorae lying unburied on the seafloor at the site of the wreck, with many fine ceramics beneath them. The ship had been carrying wine to sell. The wreck has been dated to between 420 and 400 BCE during Greece's Classical period.

The Peristera shipwreck is now an underwater museum. Hadjidaki is happy that the archaeological site is open to the public, and claims to have suggested this very idea shortly after the shipwreck was discovered.

Hadjidaki searched for and explored a Minoan wreck off Pseira starting in 2003. A trading ship sank near the shore between 1725 and 1700 BCE. While the wooden ship itself hasn't been preserved, Hadjidaki and her team found a number of other artifacts: amphorae for transport of liquids, jugs, cooking equipment, cups, and fishing weights.

== Publications ==
=== Monographs ===
- The Classical and Hellenistic Harbor at Phalasarna: A Pirate's Port? (1988)
- The Minoan Shipwreck at Pseira, Crete (2021)

=== Book chapters ===
- Crete beyond the Palaces (2004) - Chapter 4: "A Possible Minoan Harbor on South Crete"
- Digital Cultural Heritage (2019) - "Quasi–Mixed Reality in Digital Cultural Heritage. Combining 3D Reconstructions with Real Structures on Location—The Case of Ancient Phalasarna" with Gunnar Liestøl
- In the Footsteps of Honor Frost. The life and legacy of a pioneer in maritime archaeology (2019) - "Three Decades of Adventures with Honor Frost in Crete"

=== Articles ===
- The International Journal of Nautical Archaeology and Underwater Exploration (1985)
- American Journal of Archaeology (1988)
- Hesperia: The Journal of the American School of Classical Studies at Athens (1990)
- Bulletin de correspondance hellénique (1996)
