= Skopelos =

Greek island in the Aegean

Skopelos Σκόπελος
- Municipality
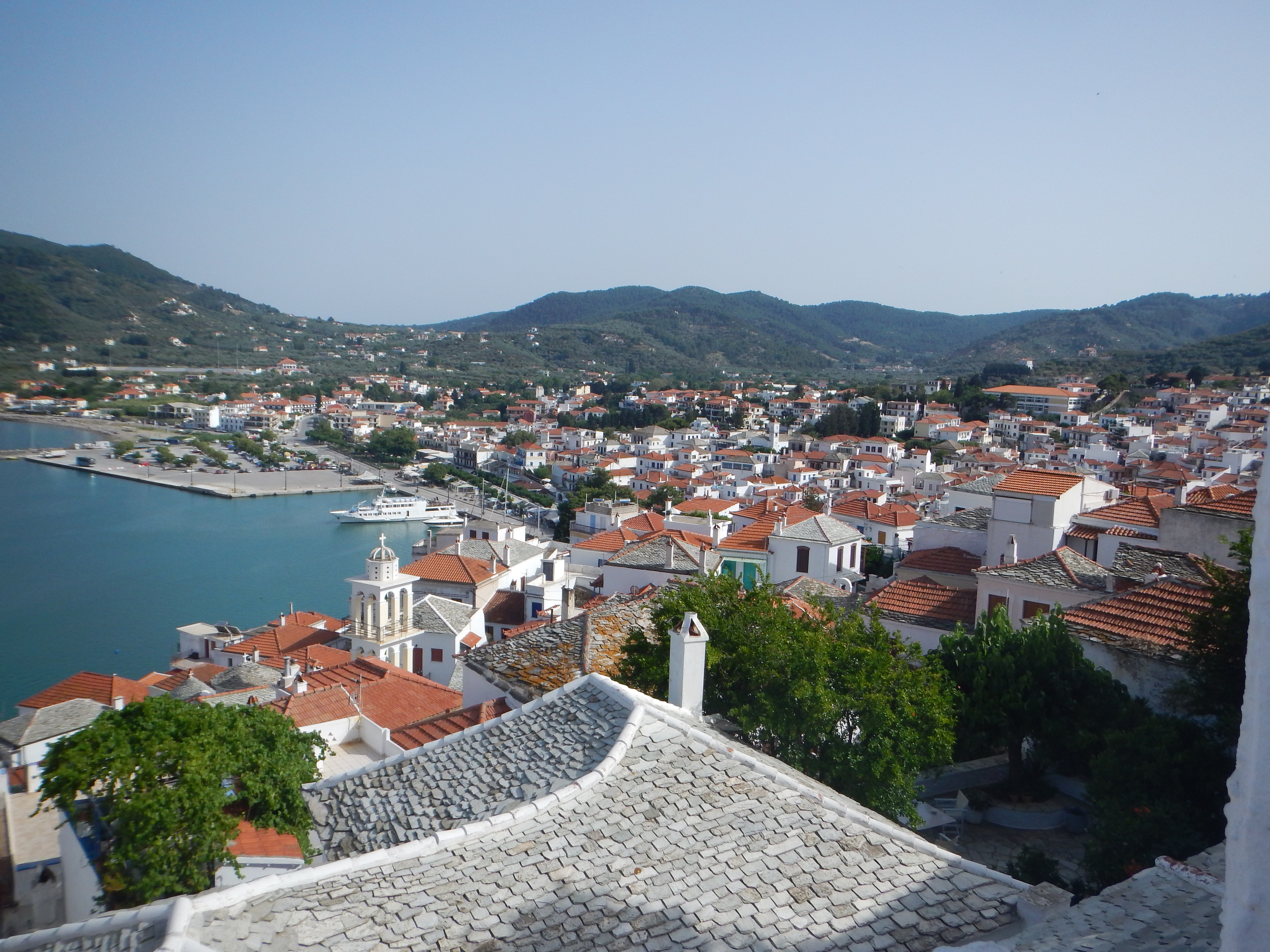
- View of the town of Skopelos

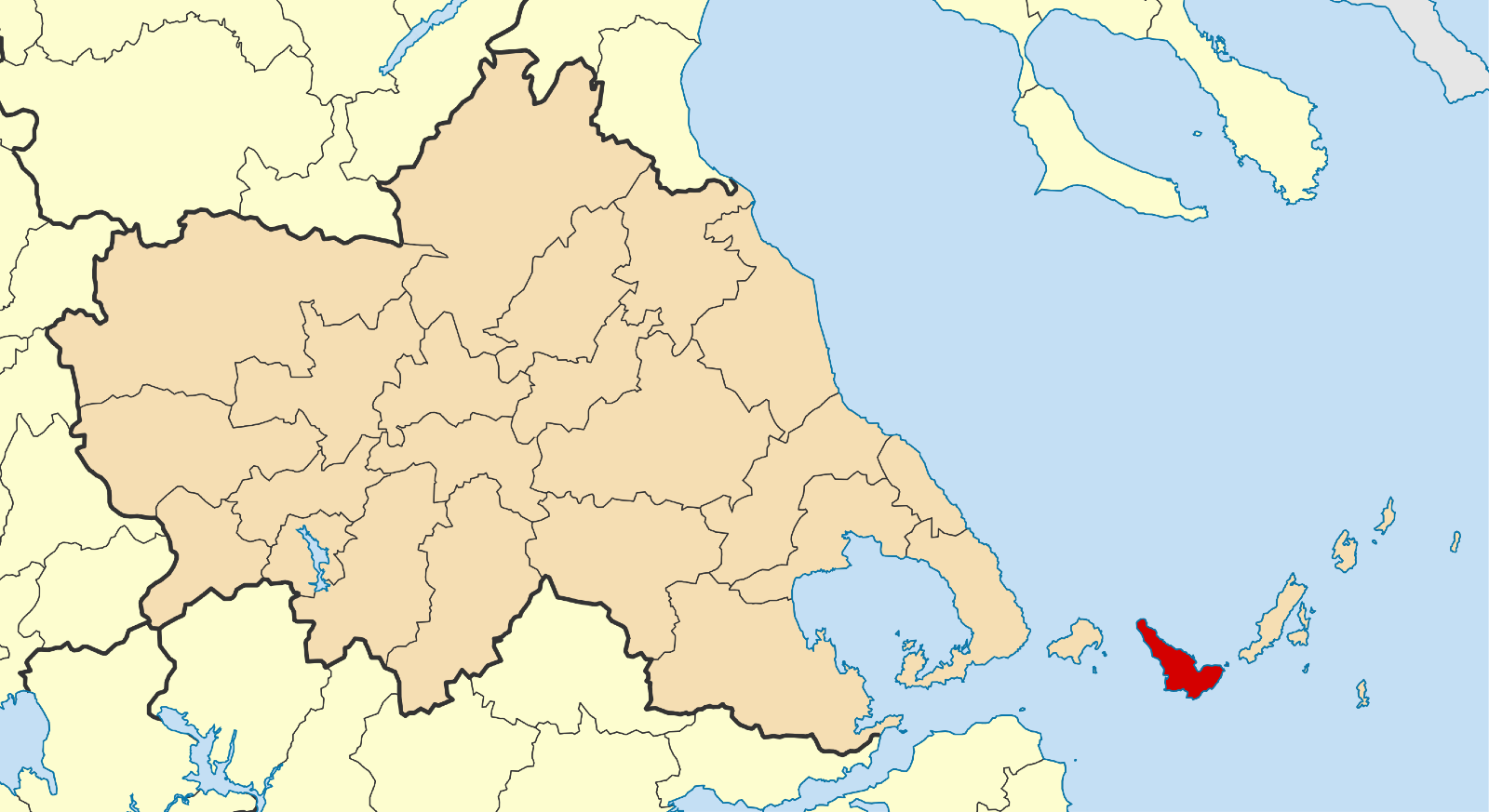

- Location within Greece
- Coordinates: 39°7′N 23°43′E
- Country: Greece
- Administrative region: Thessaly
- Regional unit: Sporades
- Seat: Skopelos

Area
  - Municipality: 96.229 km^{2} (37.154 sq mi)
- Highest elevation: 681 m (2,234 ft)
- Lowest elevation: 0 m (0 ft)

Population (2021)
  - Municipality: 4,518
  - Density: 46.95/km^{2} (121.6/sq mi)
- Time zone: UTC+2 (EET)
  - Summer (DST): UTC+3 (EEST)
- Postal code: 370 03
- Area code: 24240
- Vehicle registration: BO
- Website: skopelos.gr

Skopelos (Greek: Σκόπελος, romanized: Skópelos, [ˈskopelos]) is a Greek island in the western Aegean Sea. Skopelos is one of several islands that comprise the Northern Sporades island group, which lies east of the Pelion peninsula on the mainland and north of the island of Euboea. It is part of the Thessaly region. Skopelos is also the name of the island's main port and municipal center. The other communities of the island are Glossa and Neo Klima (Elios). The geography of Skopelos includes two mountains over 500 m (1,640 ft): Delphi (681 m/2,234 ft) in the center of the island, and Palouki (546 m (1,791 ft)) in the southeast. With an area of 96 km^{2} (37 sq mi) Skopelos is slightly larger than Mykonos (85 km^{2}/33 sq mi) and Santorini (73 km^{2}/28 sq mi). The nearest inhabited islands are Skiathos to the west and Alonnisos to the east.

== History ==
According to the legend, Skopelos was founded by Staphylos (Greek for grape), one of the sons of the god Dionysos and the princess Ariadne of Crete. Historically, in the Late Bronze Age the island, then known as Peparethos or Peparethus (Ancient Greek: Πεπάρηθος), was colonised by the Minoans, who introduced viticulture to the island.

Perhaps because of the legend of its founding by the son of the god of wine, the island was known throughout the ancient Greek cities of the Mediterranean Sea for its wine. The play Philoctetes (first performed at the Festival of Dionysus in 409 BC) by Sophocles includes a wine merchant lost on his way to "Peparethos, rich in grapes and wine".

Pliny the Elder, in his book Natural History writes:

The physician Apollodorus, in the work in which he wrote recommending King Ptolemy what wines in particular to drink—for in his time the wines of Italy were not generally known—has spoken in high terms of that of Naspercene in Pontus, next to which he places the Oretic, and then the Aeneatian, the Leucadian, the Ambraciotic, and the Peparethian, to which last he gives the preference over all the rest. However, he states that it enjoyed an inferior reputation, from the fact of its not being considered fit for drinking until it had been kept for six years.

In 1936 excavations in the area of Staphylos/Velanio uncovered a royal tomb of the era of Mycenaean Greece. The island was briefly under the control of the city-state Chalcis, Euboea since at least the 8th century BC.

In turn, the island would come under the political influence or direct domination of:

- Athens
- The Kingdom of Macedon (338–146 BC)
- The Roman Republic (146–27 BC)
- The Roman Empire (27 BC – 395 AD)
- The Byzantine Empire (395–1204)
- The Latin Empire of Constantinople (c. 1204–1277)
- The Byzantine Empire (1277–?)
- The Ottoman Empire (?–1403)
- The Byzantine Empire (1403–1456)
- The Republic of Venice; known as Scopelo (1456–1538)
- The Ottoman Empire (1538 until the Greek War of Independence)

Albanians also settled on the island, thereafter assimilating into the Greek population.

Skopelos became part of the First Hellenic Republic under the London Protocol confirming its sovereignty (3 February 1830). During World War II, Skopelos fell under Axis occupation. At first, it was occupied by the Kingdom of Italy (June 1941 – September 1943) and then by Nazi Germany (September 1943 – October 1944). Skopelos and the rest of Greece returned to a democratic-style government in 1944.

== Geography ==
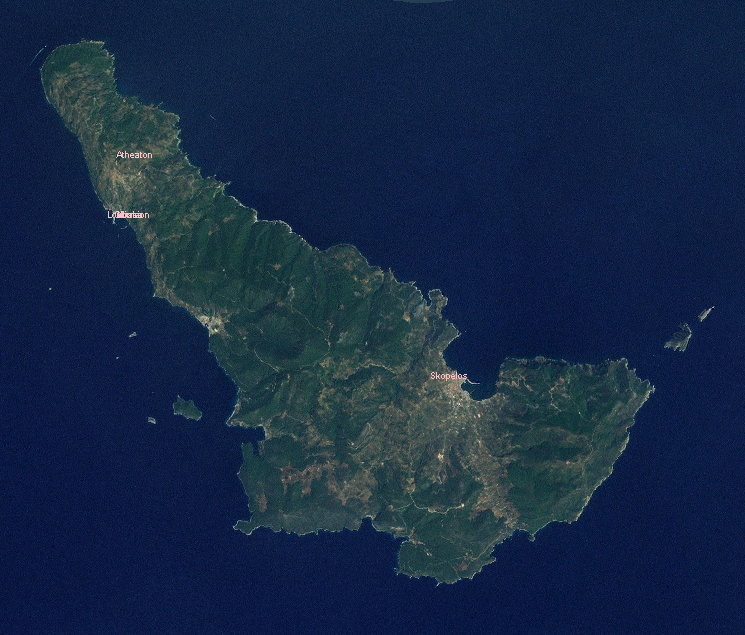
Satellite image of Skopelos.

Skopelos has the shape of a saxophone, with the "neck" pointing northwest, and the "bell" lying on the east. There are not many bays and natural harbors, and cliffs steeply fall into the sea in the greatest part of the coast. Mountains dominate the western and eastern parts of the island. There are several plains; in Staphylos, Ditropon, and Panormos. The main port of Skopelos can sometimes be closed due to northerly gales. The smaller bays of Staphylos, Agnondas on the south coast and Panormos on the west offer better protection. The municipality has an area of 96.299 square kilometres (37.181 square miles).

=== Communities ===
The main port and municipal center of the island (Skopelos or Chora) is situated in the bay on the northern coast. It is noted for its architectural heritage. On the census of 2011, it had 3,090 inhabitants.

The second largest settlement is Glossa village, situated on the northwestern tip of the island, just above Loutraki harbour, with an elevation ranging from 200 to 300 m (656 to 984 ft). It is 25.4 km (15.8 mi) from Skopelos town. It is a tranquil village with traditional houses, with 993 residents.

Neo Klima or "Elios" is a purpose-built village constructed after the great 1965 earthquake to resettle the displaced residents of the severely damaged village of (Old) Klima. It is situated by the coast on the west side of the island. The village had 463 inhabitants in the 2001 census.

Other settlements include Stafylos, Agnondas, Panormos, Ananias, Klima, Atheato, Loutraki, Kalogiros, and Myloi.

== Economy ==
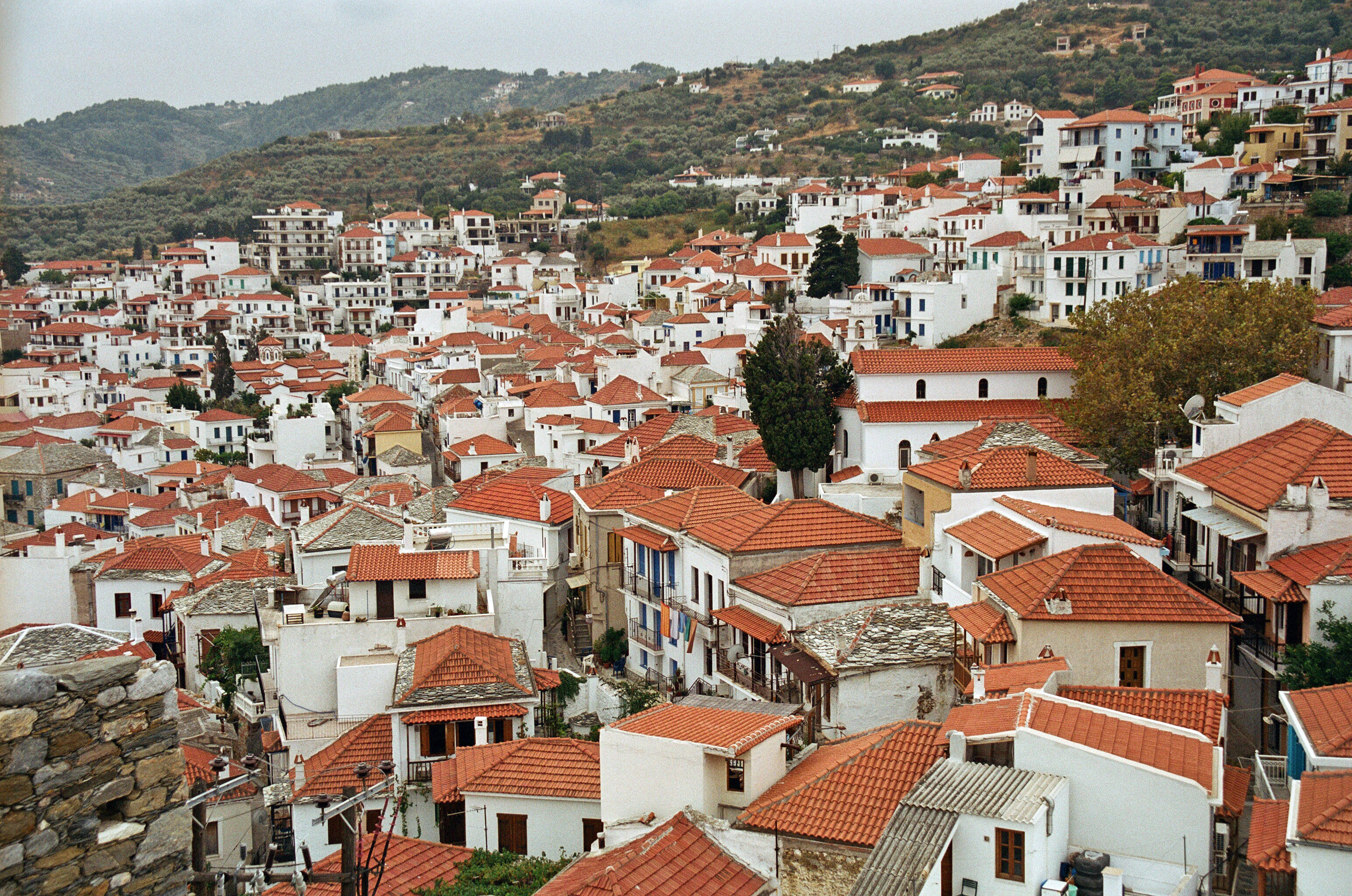
Skopelos (town)

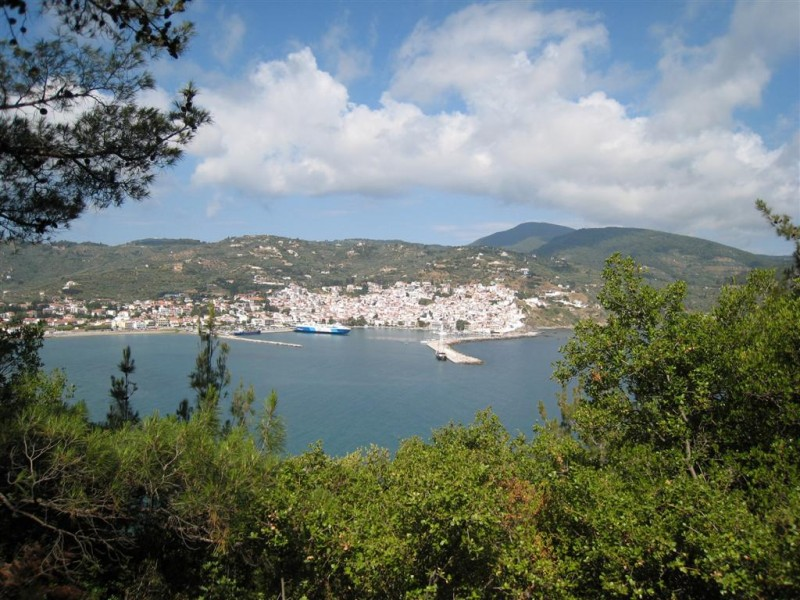
View of Chora

The economy of Skopelos is now fully dependent on the tourism industry, which supports construction and other development related industries. Though tourism is greatest during the summer months, Skopelos is also a year-round retirement destination for Northern Europeans. Some residents expected an increase in tourism due to the filming of Mamma Mia! on the island in September 2007.

Agriculture, once a staple of the local economy, is in decline. Plum and almond orchards exist but are less extensive than in the past. Wine production from local grape has been minimal ever since the phylloxera blight of the 1940s destroyed the vineyards. Though there is local small-scale wine production using local grapes, most wine produced on the island is for home use and much is pressed from grapes imported from Thessaly. Herding of domestic goats and domestic sheep continues and a local feta type cheese (katiki) is produced from these stocks. Beekeeping and honey production have increased in recent years. Skopelos supports a small fishing fleet which fishes local waters.

The island once had a vital wooden shipbuilding industry and contributed many ships to the War of Greek Independence (1821–1831). Shipbuilding began to decline after the introduction of steamships. The Encyclopædia Britannica Eleventh Edition (1911) stated "Almost every householder in both islands (Skopelos and Skiathos) is the owner, joint owner or skipper of a sailing ship." Today the art of building ships and boats in the traditional style is virtually nonexistent and is seen only in the repairing of small wooden vessels. Skopelos cannot support its population with locally produced food and goods. Most of what is used and consumed must be imported by ship from the mainland. Prices for food and consumer goods reflect the added expense of transportation. Therefore purchases of food and drink run 10 percent higher in Skopelos than on the mainland. Most building materials, including sand, must also be imported. Gasoline or petrol costs are, at minimum, 15 percent higher than on the mainland.

Skopelos is a matrilineal society. Wealth is passed on via the female line. By custom, the parents of each Skopelitan bride provide the new couple with at least a house and some property. The house and property remain in the bride's name. This custom is particularly insular as in most other parts of Greece, especially on the mainland and Crete, wealth is patrilineal.

=== Local food production ===
- Olives and olive oil: Olive oil plays a role in the Skopelos diet, being the basis of all recipes of traditional cuisine. The most prevalent olive is the "Pelion" variety, larger and rounder than the "Kalamata". For eating, the olives are cured both in the ripened and the unripened stages.
- Feta: A semi-soft, crumbly, well-salted white cheese made from goat milk. Used in Skopelos cheese pie and other vegetable pies, added to salads and served with meals.
- Cheese Pie: Not by definition a real pie, but a tiropita, a deep fried spiral of cheese stuffed phyllo dough. The pie is generally about 15 cm (6 in) in diameter and 3 cm (1 in) high.
- Honey: Honey in Skopelos is mainly pine honey from conifer trees and flower honey from the nectar of fruit trees and wildflowers.
- Prunes: Oven or sun-dried Blue or Red Plums.

== Environment ==
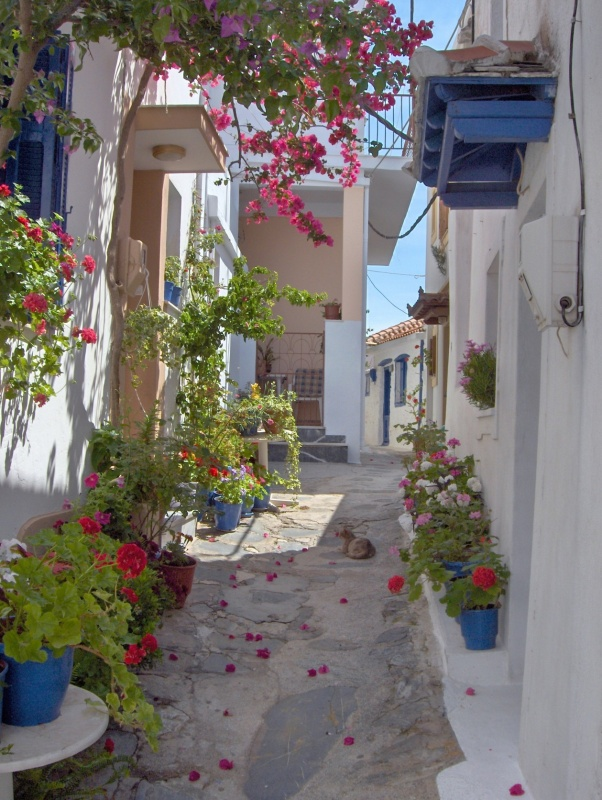
Traditional narrow street of the island.

Skopelos is one of the greenest islands in the Aegean Sea. The island has a wide range of flowers, trees, and shrubs. The local vegetation is chiefly made up of forests of Aleppo pines (Pinus halepensis), Kermes oaks (Quercus coccifera), a small forest of holm oaks (Quercus ilex), Oleo-Ceratonion maquis, fruit trees, and olive groves. The pine forests on Skopelos have replaced oak species that predominated in the past; this is due to a preference for pine trees since their timber is widely used for ship construction.

=== Ecology ===
As "The Green and Blue Island", Skopelos lags behind urban Greece in rubbish recycling and sewage treatment. Currently, there is a rubbish recycling program in Skopelos. Solid and hazardous waste is deposited in a landfill or dumped unofficially on untended public or private land. Periodically families of Romani people come to Skopelos to collect scrap metal from areas around the island where trash has been illegally dumped. The scrap metal is removed from the island by lorry and sold on the mainland. Beer and bulk wine bottles are recycled by the distributors. There is a deposit collected for each bottle at the time of purchase which is redeemed upon return.

=== Water resources ===
The sources of the municipal water supply are various spring-fed tanks located around the island. The three island communities supply water within a limited but expanding part of their jurisdictions. Homes outside the municipal water system use wells or cisterns to collect rainwater. There are plans to construct an artificial lake in the area of Panormos to supply water to farmers. Private water wells supply some agricultural needs and water from these wells can be transported by lorry to outlying areas to refill cisterns or swimming pools. The municipal water is good quality. As most natural sources of water in limestone environments, the water has a high calcium content.

=== Alternative energy ===
Over the past 30 years, residents have begun to use solar collectors for hot water. With about 2,400 hours of sunlight per year, Skopelos has the potential to increase its solar energy use and to develop alternative sources of energy that make use of frequent and steady northerly wind. Major construction and mass tourism development projects for hotels and tourist housing have not yet embraced the concept of alternative resources. Most recently built projects rely on electricity generated on the mainland, even for hot water.

== Wildlife ==
=== Birds ===
Skopelos has a variety of fauna – including about 60 bird species including migrants. There are several birds of prey, most common being the Eleonora's falcon, the Eurasian scops owl and the common buzzard. Also to be seen are kestrels, eagles, and vultures, and very obvious throughout the island is the hooded crow. Occasionally grey herons and common kingfishers and, more commonly, the great cormorant, the herring gull and the yellow-legged gull are seen along the coast. In March 2007 the Municipal Authorities cleaned a wetland habitat near the town beach at the outlet to the sea of Skopelos' only permanently flowing stream. The area had been home to frogs and the birds that fed on them.

=== Mammals ===
The Northern Sporades are one of the prime breeding areas of the Mediterranean monk seal, an endangered species. The main threat to the seal population is human activities. Often deliberately killed or accidentally caught in fishing equipment, its food sources are declining also. In addition, marine pollution and uncontrolled tourism are destroying the seal's natural habitat. The establishment in 1992 of the National Marine Park of Alonnissos-Northern Sporades was an effort to protect this species by restricting human encroachment on seal breeding areas. Wild land mammals include stone martens, brown rats and house mice, the southern white-breasted hedgehog, bats and, though declining in numbers, European hares. A mating pair of fallow deer have been privately reintroduced to the island. A population of feral cats exists in and around areas of human habitation.

=== Reptiles ===
The island is home to a variety of reptiles. The Balkan pond turtle can be found near fresh water along with the Greek marsh frog, though this habitat is slowly disappearing due to development. The Erhard's wall lizard is seen regularly in daylight in warm weather and the Mediterranean house gecko at night. A larger lizard is the Balkan green lizard. Several species of snakes can be observed: the Montpellier snake, the leopard snake, the Caspian whipsnake, the four-lined snake, the grass snake, and the nose-horned viper.

=== Amphibians ===
In or near fresh water there is sometimes found the Balkan frog and the European tree frog. Near or away from water there are common toads.

=== Domesticated animals ===
The island has its own acknowledged breed of goat (Αίγα Σκοπέλου), named after it. The Skopelos goat is one breed in the southern multicoloured group. It is a relative of the wild goat of the island of Gioura. The main occurrences of this species are in Skopelos, Alonissos and Skiathos. Sheep herds on the island belong to a distinctive group called the "Skopelos Sheep" breed.

== Architectural heritage ==
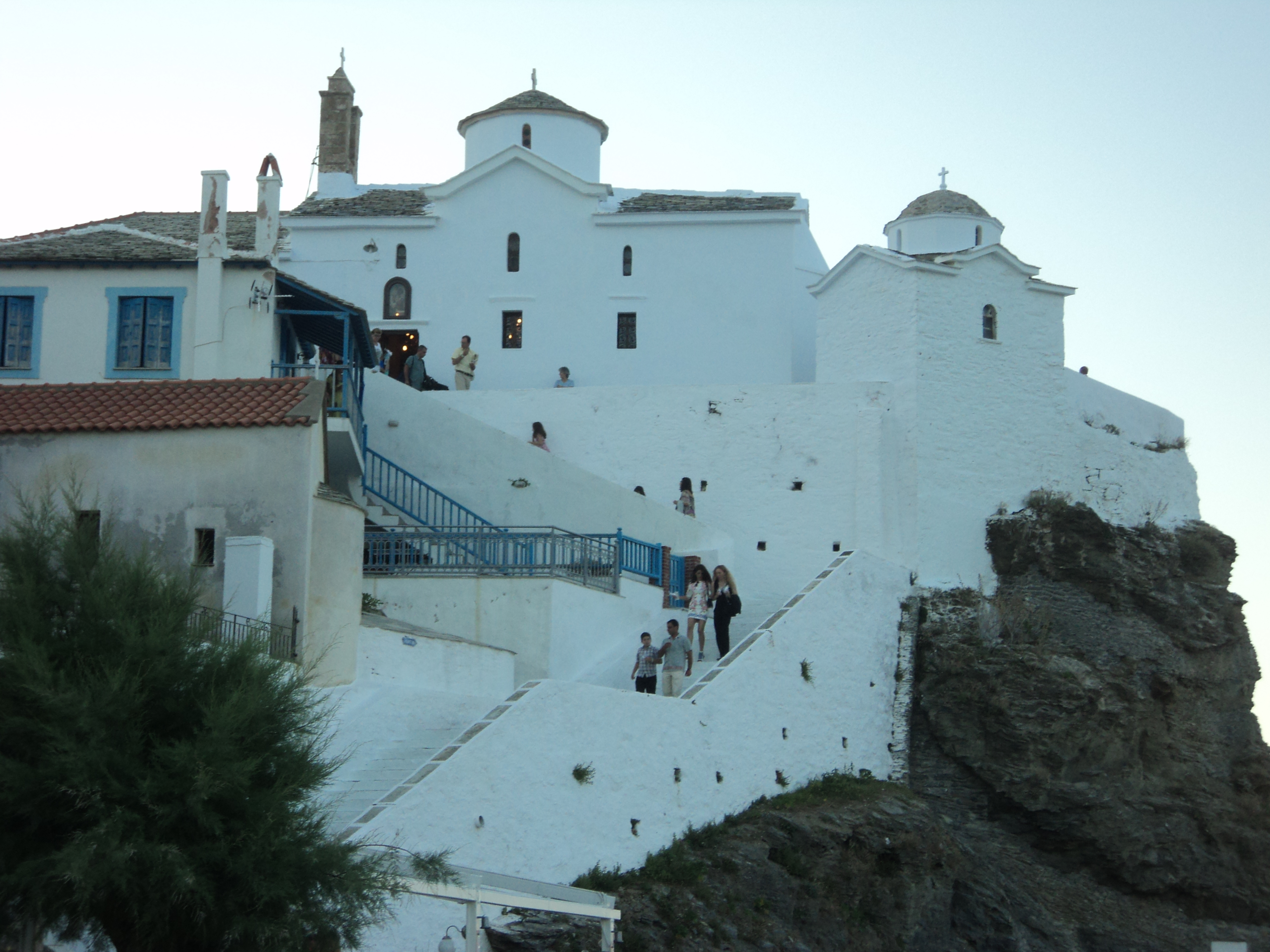
A church

A house of Skopelos town renovated within the guidelines of the Presidential Decree of 1978.

The town of Skopelos was honoured as a Traditional Settlement of Outstanding Beauty (19/10/1978 Presidential Decree 594,13-11/78, signed by President of Greece Konstantinos Tsatsos). This is the Greek equivalent of a site of Outstanding Architectural Inheritance. The building code for new construction and renovation within the village reflects some restrictions due to the Traditional Settlement decree. Some restrictions stipulate that no new buildings shall be more than two stories, there must be a sloped ceramic or stone roof in the traditional style, and doors, windows, and balconies be made of wood.

=== Churches ===
The island has more than 360 churches and chapels. Most are closed throughout the year except for the feast day of to whom or whatever the church has been dedicated, and the majority have been privately built. The oldest existing ecclesiastical structure is the Basilica of Agios Athanasios, built in the 11th century and located in the Kastro area. All except one of the churches on the island observe the Greek Orthodox faith. The remaining church hosts a small enclave of Jehovah's Witnesses. Christianity was formalized in Skopelos by the appointment of the Bishop Riginos in the 4th century. Under the Reign of the Emperor Julian the Apostate, Riginos was martyred in 362 AD. The saint's feast day is February 25 — a holiday on the island.

== Transport ==
Car ownership in Greece increased by 121% between 1990 and 2004. Skopelos reflects this trend and the local authorities are hard pressed to deal with the increased traffic and parking issues. Along with the resident population of cars, the burden of tourist and summer resident vehicles and the availability of rental cars and motorbikes have created problems for which solutions have not yet been found. The construction of a large asphalt parking area along the waterfront in the late 1990s has done little to address the parking problems facing the town of Skopelos. During the summer the population of the island increases from about 5,000 to between 15,000 and 20,000 (est. 1993).

Skopelos has one main road that links the three main villages by coach several times daily.

In the mid-1980s the mayor's council voted to apply to the Ministry of the Interior for the construction of an airport. The application was denied. There is a heliport in case of medical emergencies.

The island is served by commuter hydrofoils and ferryboats from the ports of Volos, Magnesia and Agios Konstantinos, Phthiotis on mainland Greece, which also allows connections to and from Alonissos and Skiathos. In summer there is a ferry to and from Kymi in Euboea.

== Province ==
The province of Skopelos (Greek: Επαρχία Σκοπέλου) was one of the provinces of the Magnesia Prefecture. Its territory corresponded with that of the current regional unit Sporades, and included the islands Skopelos, Skiathos, Alonnisos. It was abolished in 2006.

== Beaches ==
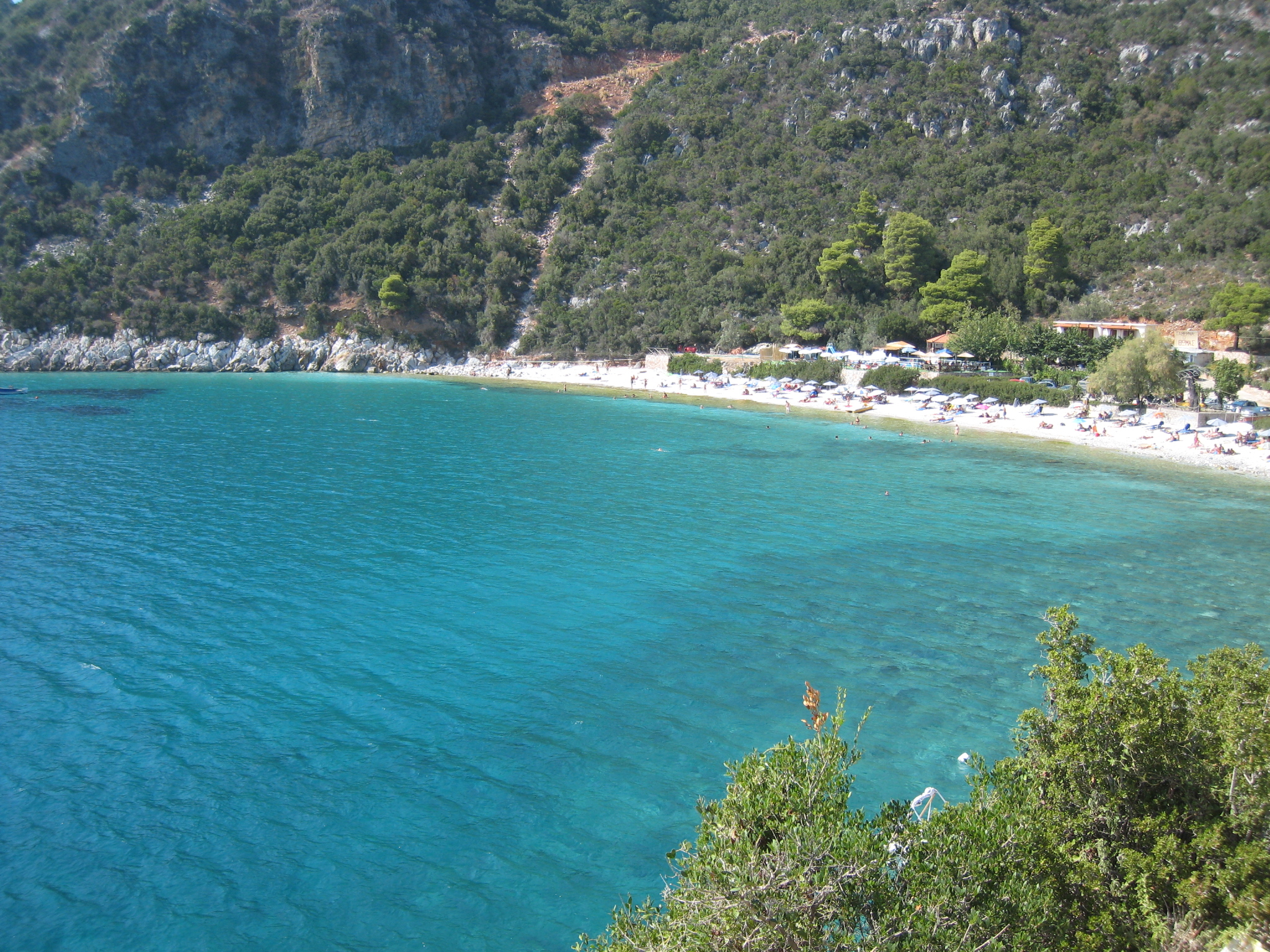
Beach in Skopelos

The length of the coastline of Skopelos is 67 km (42 mi). Due to the island's mountainous terrain most of the coast is inaccessible. The following are beaches accessible by road or trail: Staphylos, Velanio (official nudism beach since 2011), Agnondas, Limnonari, Panormos, Adrines, Milia, Kastani, Elios, Hovolo, Armenopetra, Kalives, Glyfoneri, Glysteri, Perivoliou, Keramoto, and Chondrogiorgos.

== Notable Skopelitans ==
- Giannis Alexiou, Greek chef and restaurateur.
- Diocles of Peparethus (late 4th-early 3rd century BC), was a historian from Peparethos.
- Ellopion of Peparethus (Ἐλλοπίων), a Socratic philosopher.
- Fani Palli-Petralia, Former Minister of Employment and Social Security 2007–2009. former Minister of Tourism 2006-2007.
- Nikolaides family: Nikolakis Hatzistamatis, the founder of the Nikolaides family was born on the island of Skiathos around 1770. He moved to Skopelos where he served as one of the island's highest officials. Nikolakis Hatzistamatis is mentioned by the Greek author Alexandros Papadiamantis in the novel "Hatzopoulo". His only son Jannios (1800–1885), changed the family name to Nikolaides. Jannios also served in high offices. Descendants of the above are the present donors of the Folklore Museum of Skopelos.
- Cat Cora (Katerina Karagiozi), a Greek-American professional chef best known for her featured role as an "Iron Chef" on the Food Network television show Iron Chef America.
- Ivan Rebroff, the German singer, owned a villa on the island and became an honorary citizen.
- Gordon Haskell, an English singer-songwriter used to live on the island. His father Harry Hionides was a Greek American.
- Michael Carroll (1935-2020), Anglo-Irish writer who spent many years on Skopelos. He tells of how he arrived at Panormos Bay, where he built a house, in his book "Gates of the Wind" (John Murray, 1965).

== In cinema ==
Skopelos and its neighbour Skiathos were the filming locations of the 2008 film Mamma Mia! The wedding procession was filmed at the Agios Ioannis Chapel near Glossa.

== Books ==
- Held, Marc (1994). Skopelos - the Landscapes and Vernacular Architecture of an Aegean Island. Reprotime. ISBN 9789608556706 – via Google Books.
- Parsons, Heather (2004). Skopelos Trails: A Nature and Walking Guide to Skopelos Island, Greece. Sotos Series. ISBN 9789609156103 – via Google Books.
- Carroll, Michael (1965). Gates of the Wind. London: John Murray. ISBN 9780719501975 – via Google Books.
