= French ship Thérèse (1665) =

Ship of the line of the French Navy

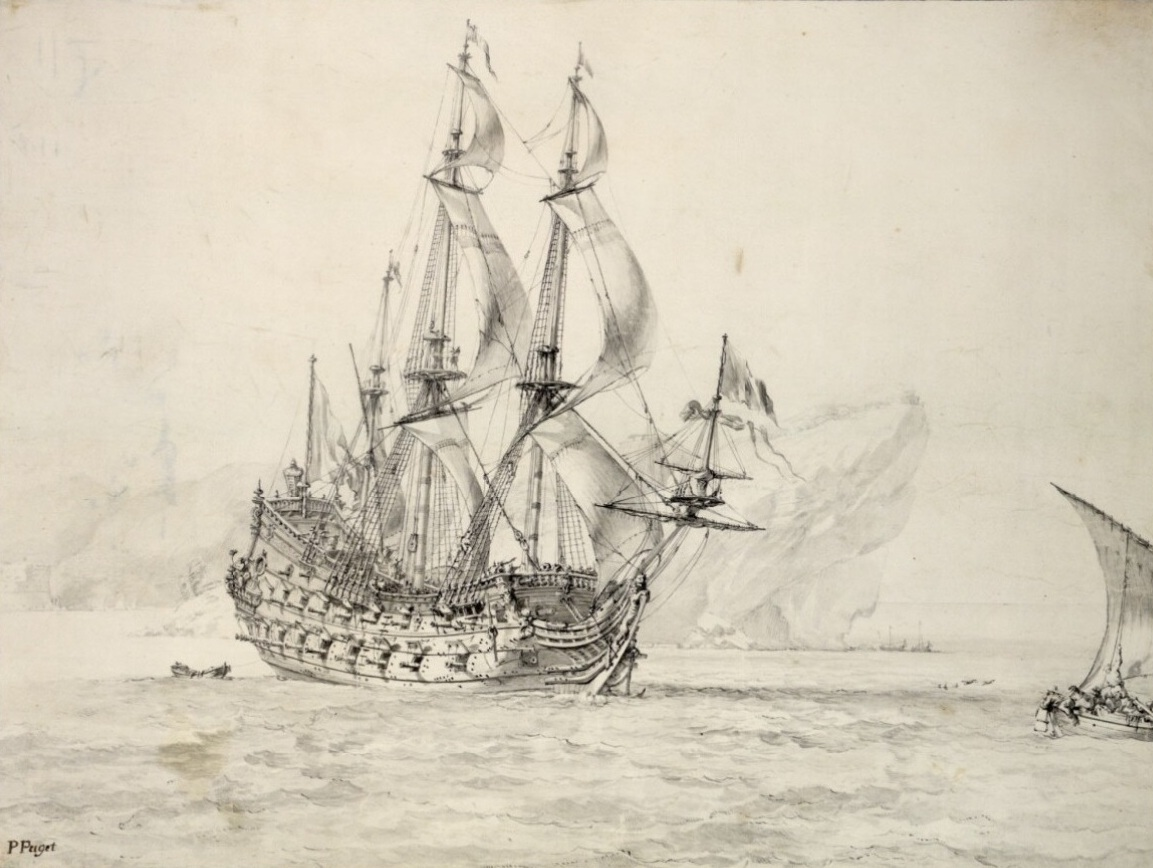
- A ship of Thérèse's type in the mid-1600s

History

France
- Name: Thérèse
- Builder: Toulon
- Laid down: July 1662
- Launched: 13 March 1665
- Completed: December 1665
- Fate: Blew up and sank on 24 July 1669

General characteristics
- Class & type: 58-gun ship of the line
- Tonnage: 850 tons
- Length: 127 French feet (Note: The French (pre-metric) foot was 6.575% longer than the equivalent English foot.)
- Beam: 32 French feet
- Depth of hold: 15 French feet
- Propulsion: Sails
- Sail plan: Full-rigged ship
- Complement: 350, + 5 officers
- Armament: 58 guns comprising: 24 × 18-pounders on the lower deck; 24 × 12-pounders on the upper deck; 10 × 8-pounders on the quarterdeck and forecastle

Thérèse was a 58-gun ship of the line of the French Navy. She was designed and built by François Pomet in Toulon Dockyard between 1662 and 1665 and was classed as a vaisseau de troisième rang (ship of the third rank). She was part of a French relief effort to Candia during a siege by the Ottomans and was sunk on 24 July 1669 after an explosion in her powder magazine. At the time she was a flagship of the expedition.

== History ==
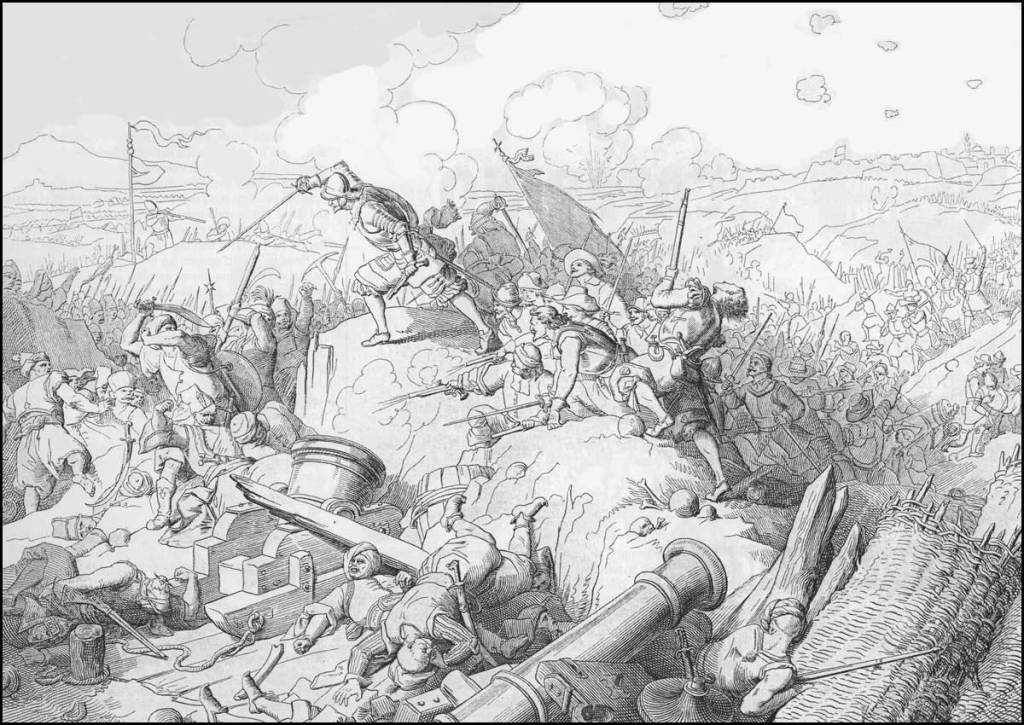
French troops in Candia. Illustration by Giuseppe Lorenzo Gatteri, 1863.

Thérèse arrived at Candia on 19 June 1669 in company with 17 transport ships and 6,000 French soldiers. The French force was there to support the Venetian forces during the Siege of Candia. Another 24 French warships arrived on 3 July. Six days after their arrival the leader of the French corps, François de Vendôme, Duc de Beaufort, was killed in battle and Philippe de Montaut-Bénac took over. On 10 July a council of all the leaders of the allied armies took place and the decision was made to use the fleet to attack the Turks northwest of the city, as this part of the city was totally impoverished. After the bombardment the allied forces aimed to strike and repel the Turks. 24 July was selected as the day of the operation. As planned that day, the whole Navy sailed west of the city to the mouth of the river Giofyros. The fleet comprised 58 warships mounting 1100 cannon. For three hours the fleet continuously bombarded the Turks, when suddenly Thérèse's powder magazine caught fire, resulting in the destruction of the ship. Only seven of her crew survived out of 350. Immediately after this incident there was great confusion in the French naval force and the fleet's commander, Vincenzo Rospigliosi, ordered the bombardment to be abandoned, and sailed the fleet to the island of Dia.

The incident seriously damaged the citizens' and sailors' morale and caused divisions in the military leadership. The leader of the French force, Philippe de Montaut, decided to withdraw from the city, having sustained casualties of over 2,000 dead and injured, and suffering a shortage of food and supplies.

Captain General Francesco Morosini, tried in vain to change de Montaut's mind. Eventually, between 16 and 21 August, the whole French fleet sailed away leaving the allied forces, a total of 3,600 men, consisting of Venetians, Italians, English, Scottish, Germans and Greeks, to fight alone against over 60,000 Turks. A few days later Morosini was informed that Turkish reinforcements had arrived in Crete, and decided to surrender the city. He signed the capitulation on 6 September and the city was handed over to the Turks.

== The shipwreck ==
Manolis Voutsalas, a Greek diver, discovered the wreck of Thérèse west of the port of Heraklion. However, he was initially unsure of her identity. In 1976, Jacques Cousteau visited Crete and Voutsalas showed him the site of the shipwreck. After several dives, Cousteau identified it as the shipwreck of Thérèse. The scientific underwater excavation of the shipwreck started in 1987 by the Greek Ephorate of Underwater Antiquities. The archaeologists M. Anagnostopoulou and Nicolas Lianos excavated the shipwreck, succeeded in mapping it and raised several objects. Among them, a bronze cannon with the inscription "Le Duc de Vendôme 1666" (admiral), and "HONARATUS SUCHET F(ecit) TOLONI" (cnf. M. Anagnostopoulou- N. Lianos, ΑΑΑ v.ΧΙΧ(1986). This is considered to be the first systematic underwater excavation in Greece.

About 30 metres (98 ft) of the hull survive, and between 1987 and 1994, about 80 square metres (860 ft^{2}) had been excavated.

== See also ==
- Naval battles of the Cretan Wars
