= Ellopion of Peparethus =

Ancient Greek philosopher

Ellopion
- Ἐλλοπίων
- Born: fl. c. 4th century BC; Peparethus

Philosophical work
- Era: Ancient philosophy
- Region: Ancient Greek philosophy
- School: Socratic

Ellopion of Peparethus (fl. 4th century BCE) was a Socratic philosopher and contemporary of Plato, who is mentioned only by Plutarch. He accompanied Plato and Simmias in philosophical discussions with an Ancient Egyptian priest named Chonuphis of Memphis:

Simmias at once recollected: "Of your tablet, Pheidolaüs, I know nothing. But Agetoridas the Spartan came to Memphis with a long document from Agesilaus for the spokesman of the god, Chonuphis, with whom Plato, Ellopion of Peparethos and I had many philosophical discussions in those days. He brought orders from the king that Chonuphis should translate the writing, if he could make anything of it, and send the translation to him at once. Chonuphis shut himself up for three days, conning scripts of all kinds in the ancient books, and then wrote his answer to the king, of which he also informed us. The document, he said, ordered the celebration of a contest in honour of the Muses; the characters had the forms of the script current in the time of King Proteus, which Heracles, the son of Amphitryon, had learned; and the god was using the inscription to instruct and urge the Greeks to live in the enjoyment of leisure and peace by always taking philosophy as their field of contention, laying their arms aside and settling their disputes about right and wrong by an appeal to the Muses and discussion.
