= Hagnon of Peparethus =

Hagnon of Peparethus was an ancient Greek athlete listed by Eusebius of Caesarea as a victor in the stadion race of the 53rd Olympiad (568 BC). He was the first winner from the Aegean Islands and the only winner from the Sporades.

== See also ==
- Olympic winners of the Stadion race
