= Diocles of Peparethus =

Diocles of Peparethus (Greek: Διοκλῆς; fl. late 4th – early 3rd century BC) was a historian from the Greek island of Peparethus. His works are lost, but they included histories of Persia and Rome: Quintus Fabius Pictor and Plutarch acknowledge their debts to the latter as a source for their histories of early Rome, its native traditions and ancestral Greek connections. Fabius' work survives only as a brief but historically significant catalogue summary. Plutarch seems to have relied on Fabius' history but acknowledges Diocles as its basis and authority. Diocles' own sources are unknown. He may have had access to Roman sources and traditions on which he foisted Greek interpretations and interpolations. Little else is known of Diocles. He appears to have been a figure of note, well travelled, and abstemious; Athenaeus cites Demetrius of Scepsis to attest that Diocles "drank cold water to the day of his death".
