= Falasarna =

Ancient Greek harbour town in Crete

- Φαλάσαρνα (Ancient Greek)
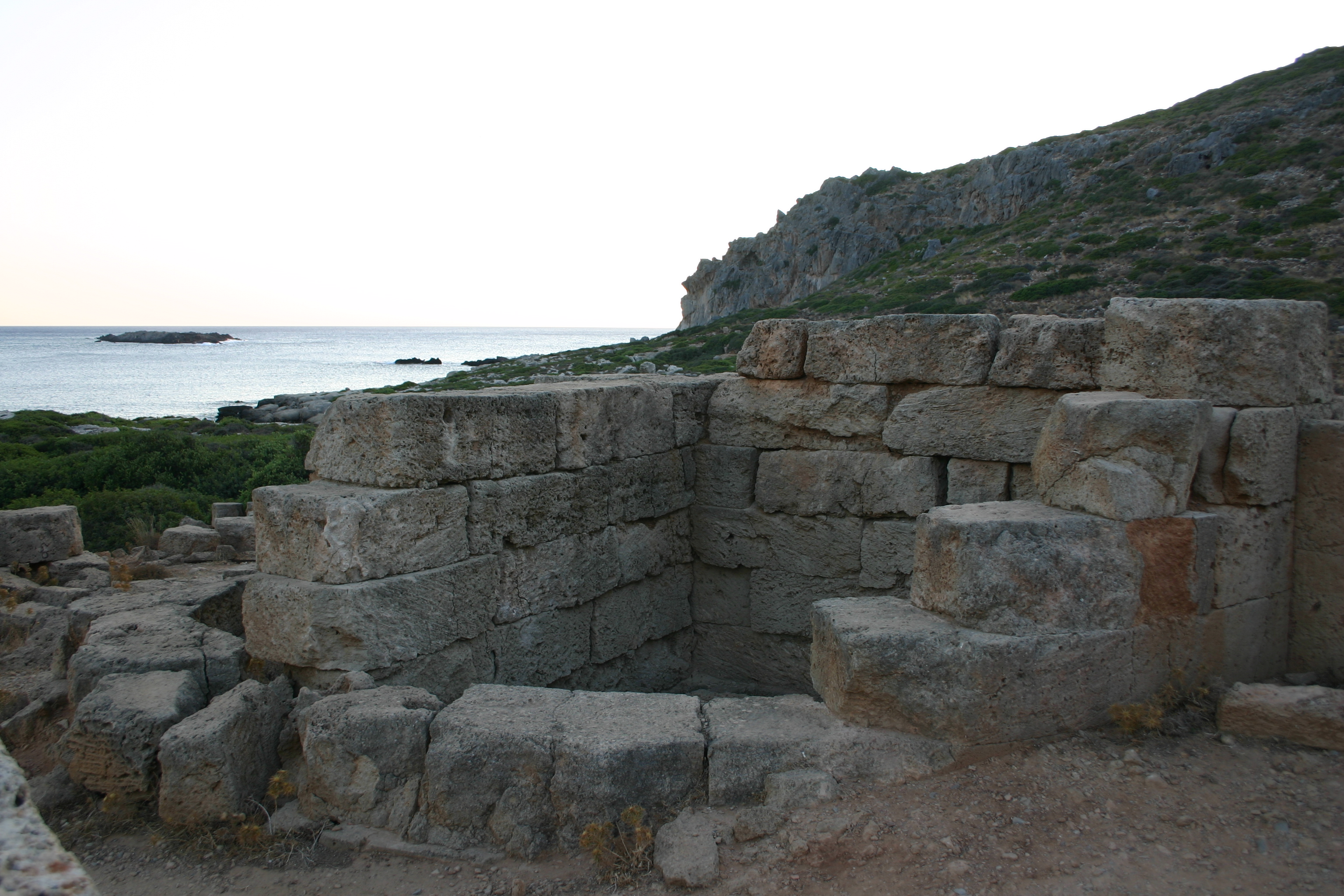
- Round sandstone tower at military harbor of Falasarna

- Location within Greece
- 35°30′37″N 23°34′03″E
- Type: settlement
- Location: Kissamos, Chania, Crete

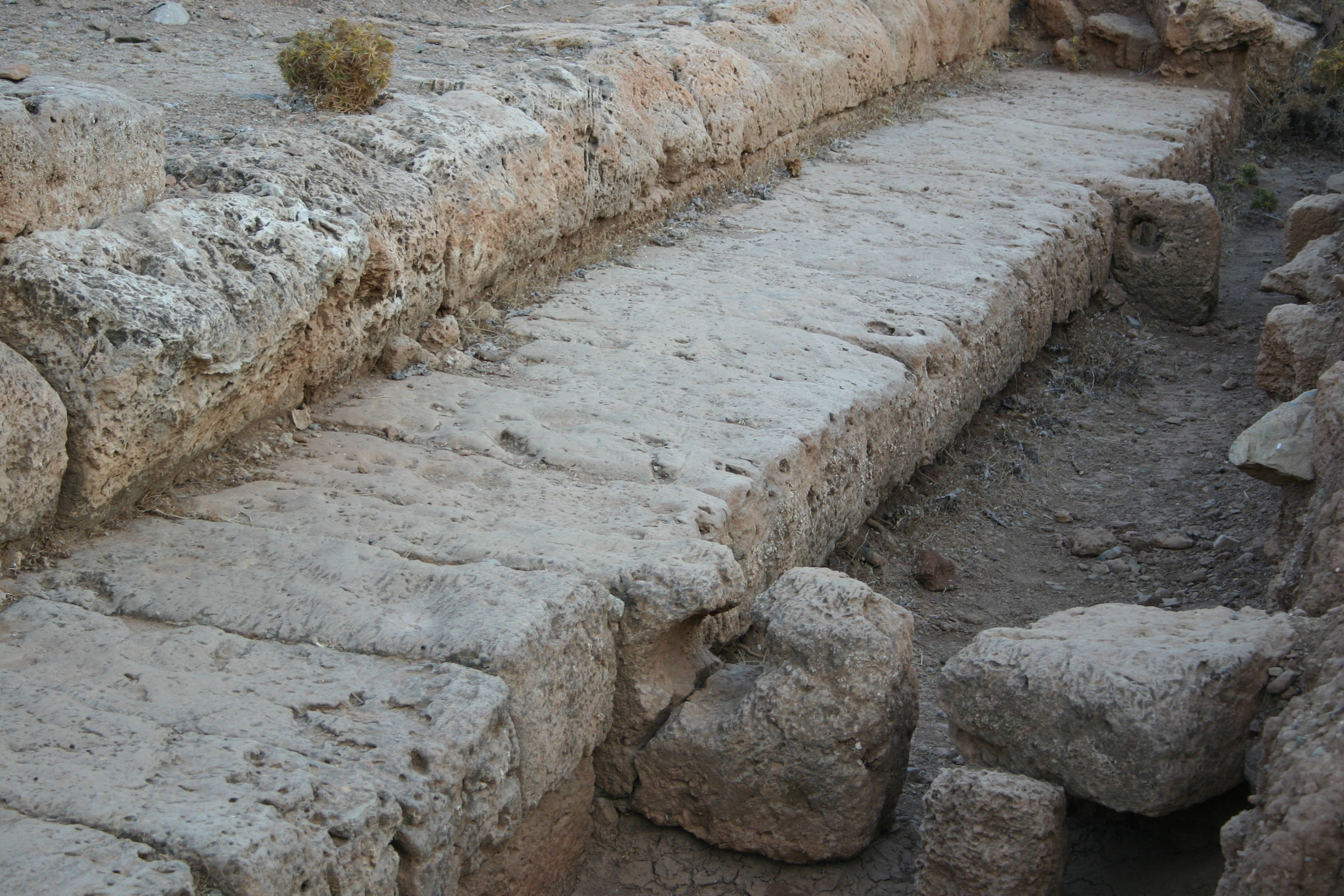
Stone quay and mooring stones from military harbor of Falasarna

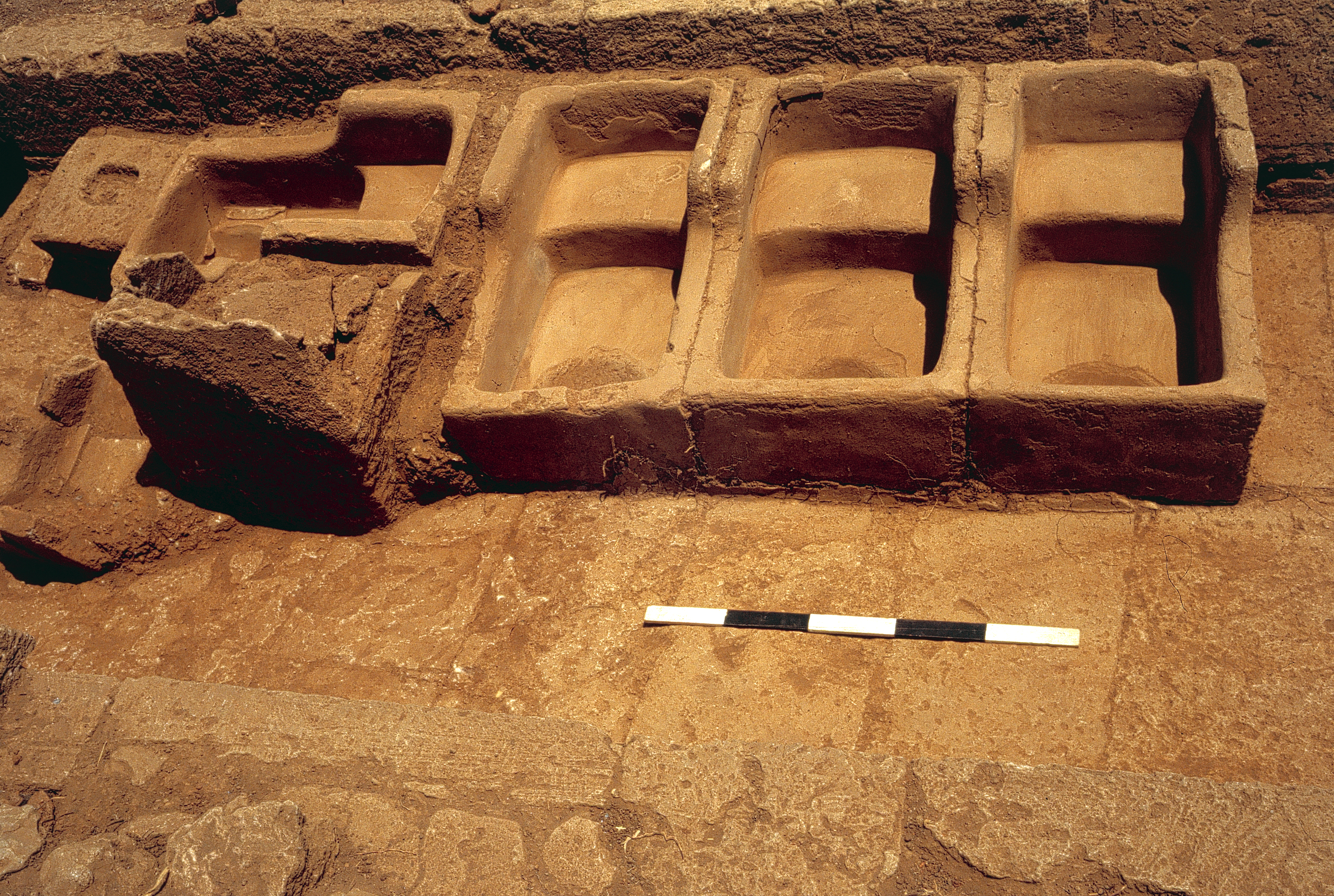
Baths of Hellenistic period excavated at Falasarna

Falasarna or Phalasarna (Ancient Greek: Φαλάσαρνα) is a Greek harbour town at the west end of Crete that flourished during the Hellenistic period. The currently visible remains of the city include several imposing sandstone towers and bastions, with hundreds of metres of fortification walls protecting the town, and a closed harbour, meaning it is protected on all sides by city walls. The harbour is ringed by stone quays with mooring stones, and connected to the sea through two artificial channels. Notable finds in the harbour area include public roads, wells, warehouses, an altar, and baths. Most of these structures were revealed by excavations that began in 1986.

The acropolis is built on a cape that rises 90 metres above the harbour and juts into the sea. The acropolis has many remains, including a temple dedicated to goddess Dictynna, fortification towers, cisterns, wells, and watchtowers that could have been used to guard sea routes.

Today Falasarna is an agricultural area and tourist attraction.

The valley is filled with olive groves and greenhouses cultivating mainly tomatoes; there are also scattered family-run hotels and restaurants. The seaside has long sandy beaches and crystal-clear waters that are popular both with residents of the province of Chania and visitors from Greece and abroad. Falasarna beach was voted, in a CNN poll, among the best 100 beaches of the world.

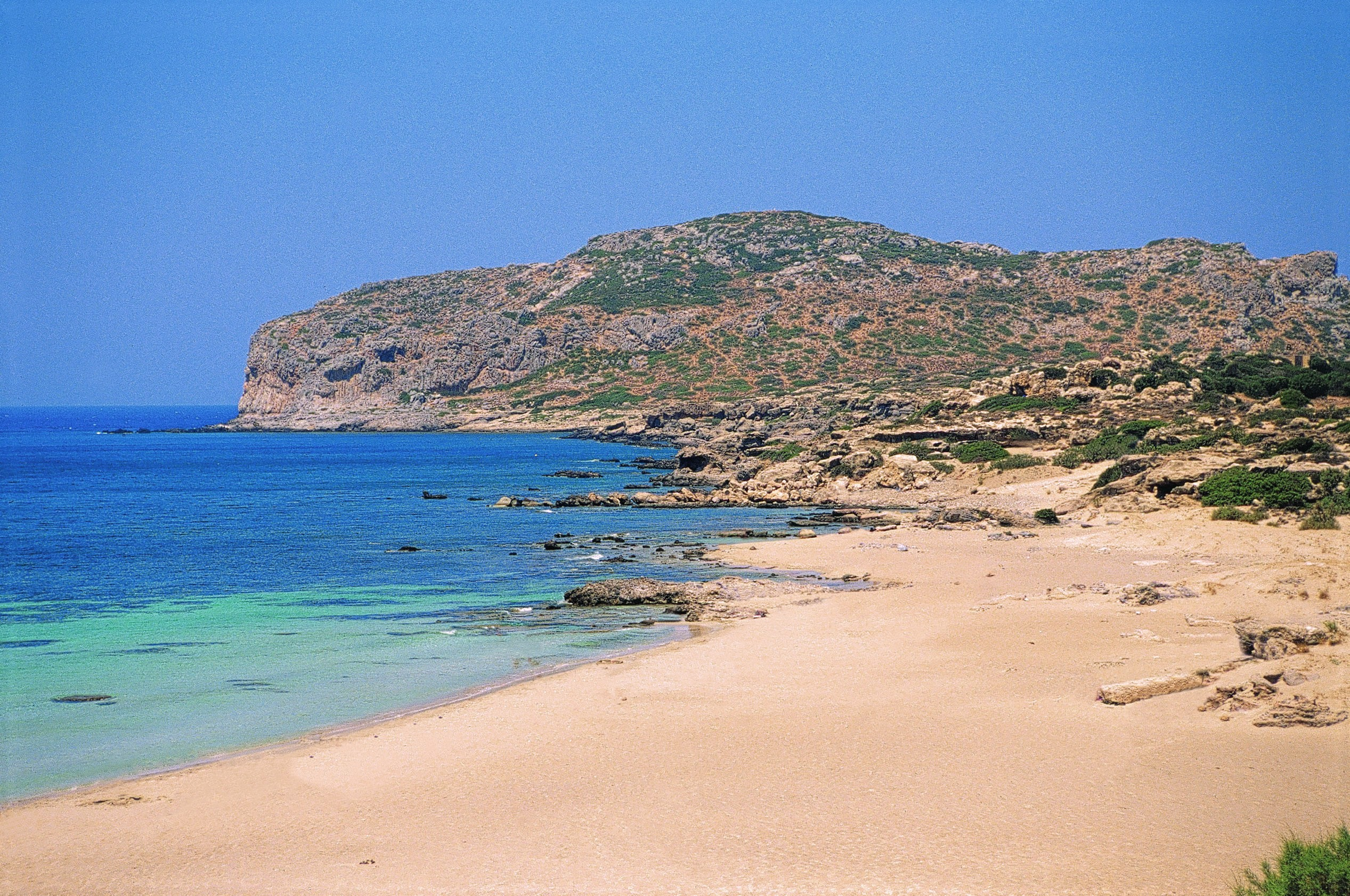
Beach of Falasarna, with acropolis of ancient site in background.

== Climate ==
Falasarna has a hot-summer Mediterranean climate (Csa in the Köppen climate classification). It has hot dry summers and exceptionally mild winters. On the night of January 11, 2021 the World Meteorological Organization station in Falasarna recorded an impressive temperature of 28.3 °C due to strong foehn winds while the minimum temperature for that day was 22.6 °C marking both the highest January temperature during a night and the highest January minimum temperature ever recorded in Greece. Also on the night of January 7, 2026 Falasarna recorded a night temperature of 27.5 °C.

On the night of March 16, 2025 Falasarna recorded a stunning night temperature of 31.7 °C. On the night of May 25, 2025 Falasarna recorded an equally stunning night temperature of 37.4 °C. Falasarna falls in 11a hardiness zone.

Climate data for Falasarna 10 m a.s.l.
Month	Jan	Feb	Mar	Apr	May	Jun	Jul	Aug	Sep	Oct	Nov	Dec	Year
Record high °C (°F)	28.3 (82.9)	28.9 (84.0)	32.6 (90.7)	36.6 (97.9)	39.8 (103.6)	38.7 (101.7)	41.4 (106.5)	41.3 (106.3)	39.6 (103.3)	36.9 (98.4)	33.0 (91.4)	29.4 (84.9)	41.4 (106.5)
Mean daily maximum °C (°F)	16.3 (61.3)	16.7 (62.1)	18.4 (65.1)	21.4 (70.5)	25 (77)	29 (84)	31.7 (89.1)	31.6 (88.9)	28.9 (84.0)	24.9 (76.8)	21.7 (71.1)	17.9 (64.2)	23.6 (74.5)
Daily mean °C (°F)	13.8 (56.8)	14.1 (57.4)	15.5 (59.9)	18 (64)	21.4 (70.5)	25.3 (77.5)	28.1 (82.6)	28.3 (82.9)	25.8 (78.4)	22.2 (72.0)	19.1 (66.4)	15.5 (59.9)	20.6 (69.0)
Mean daily minimum °C (°F)	11.3 (52.3)	11.5 (52.7)	12.5 (54.5)	14.7 (58.5)	17.7 (63.9)	21.6 (70.9)	24.5 (76.1)	25 (77)	22.8 (73.0)	19.4 (66.9)	16.6 (61.9)	13 (55)	17.6 (63.6)
Record low °C (°F)	1.6 (34.9)	4.1 (39.4)	4.2 (39.6)	8.3 (46.9)	11.1 (52.0)	16.2 (61.2)	19.6 (67.3)	20.8 (69.4)	16.6 (61.9)	12.9 (55.2)	9.7 (49.5)	3.9 (39.0)	1.6 (34.9)
Average rainfall mm (inches)	104.6 (4.12)	77.8 (3.06)	44.3 (1.74)	14 (0.6)	11 (0.4)	4.8 (0.19)	1.6 (0.06)	4.7 (0.19)	22.3 (0.88)	60.9 (2.40)	68 (2.7)	110.3 (4.34)	524.3 (20.68)
Source 1: National Observatory of Athens Monthly Bulletins (Apr 2010 - Nov 2025)
Source 2: Falasarna N.O.A station and World Meteorological Organization

== Ancient history ==
Falasarna was mentioned by the ancient historians and geographers Scylax, Strabo, Polybius, Livy, Pliny, Dionysius Kalliphontis, and the anonymous geographer known as Stadiasmus. The ancient geographers took note of the artificial closed port carved out of a lagoon and ringed with fortification walls and towers. Falasarna was a maritime power; the harbor was the reason for the city's existence, the source of its wealth, and led to its recognition. A city-state with its own laws and minting its own coins, Falasarna provided military advisers and thousands of mercenaries for a war under the Macedonian king Perseus against the Romans (Livy).

Falasarna was involved in two major wars with neighboring city-states during the Hellenistic period. The first was with Polyrrhenia, probably triggered by land disputes. It started in the late fourth century and ended around 290 BC, following mediation by Cleonymus of Sparta. The peace treaty was inscribed on a stone tablet which is today in the museum of Kissamos. A second war was fought with Cydonia around 184 BC and the disputes were finally resolved through Roman intervention (Polybius).

The city-state prospered through its maritime affairs, evidenced by the remains of monumental buildings and artwork. The treaty with Polyrrhenia gives evidence that in the third century BC the inhabitants of Falasarna were engaged in piracy, a common practice of the Cretan city-states. In 69-67 BC the Romans sent forces to eliminate piracy from the eastern Mediterranean, stormed Phalasarna, blocked its harbor with massive masonry, and destroyed the whole city, probably killing its citizens. No ancient sources testify directly to these events, but evidence of burning and the harbor blockage itself suggest the tentative conclusions of the excavators.

The location of the city was then forgotten, and Falasarna appears in Venetian records only as a lost city. The site was rediscovered in the 19th century by British explorers Robert Pashley and Captain T. A. B. Spratt. Spratt, of the Royal Navy, noted in 1859 that the former harbor of the deserted site was now 100 yards from the sea, and that the ancient sea coast must have risen at least twenty four feet. Modern excavation has confirmed this judgment, and also has shown that the harbor rapidly silted up after the Roman attack. Radiocarbon dating of fossil algae along the ancient sea level mark on the cliffs around Falasarna estimates the sudden sea level change at some time more than sixteen centuries ago. A probable event was the great earthquake and tsunami of 21 July A.D. 365, which wreaked catastrophic damage on all the coasts of the eastern Mediterranean and was recorded by Ammianus Marcellinus and others. An ancient fish basin with two flights of steps carved into the coastal rocks near the harbor entrance has been cracked in half, probably during the same earthquake.

== Excavations ==
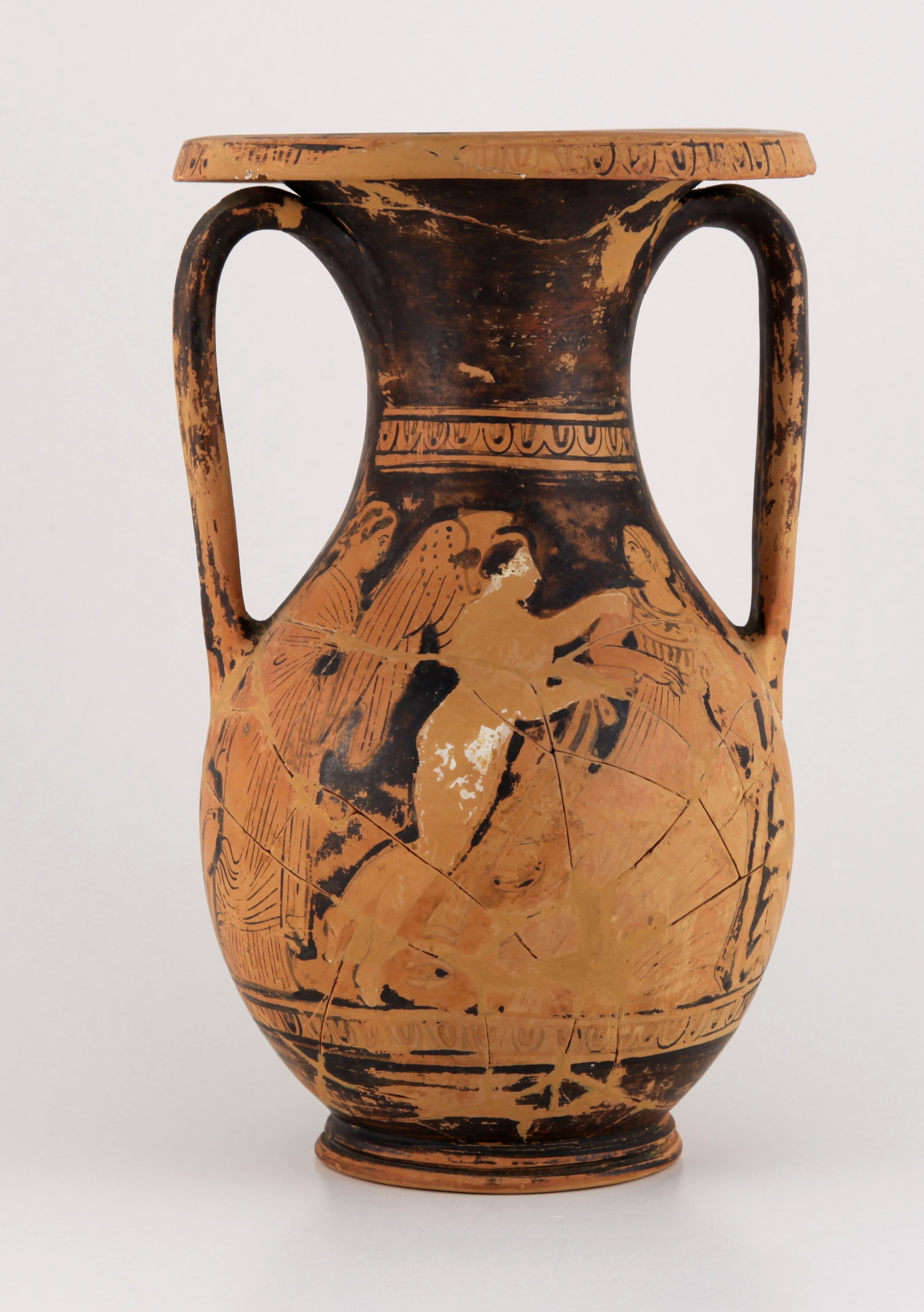
Pelike excavated at Phalasarna showing Eros chasing a Maenad. 330 BC.

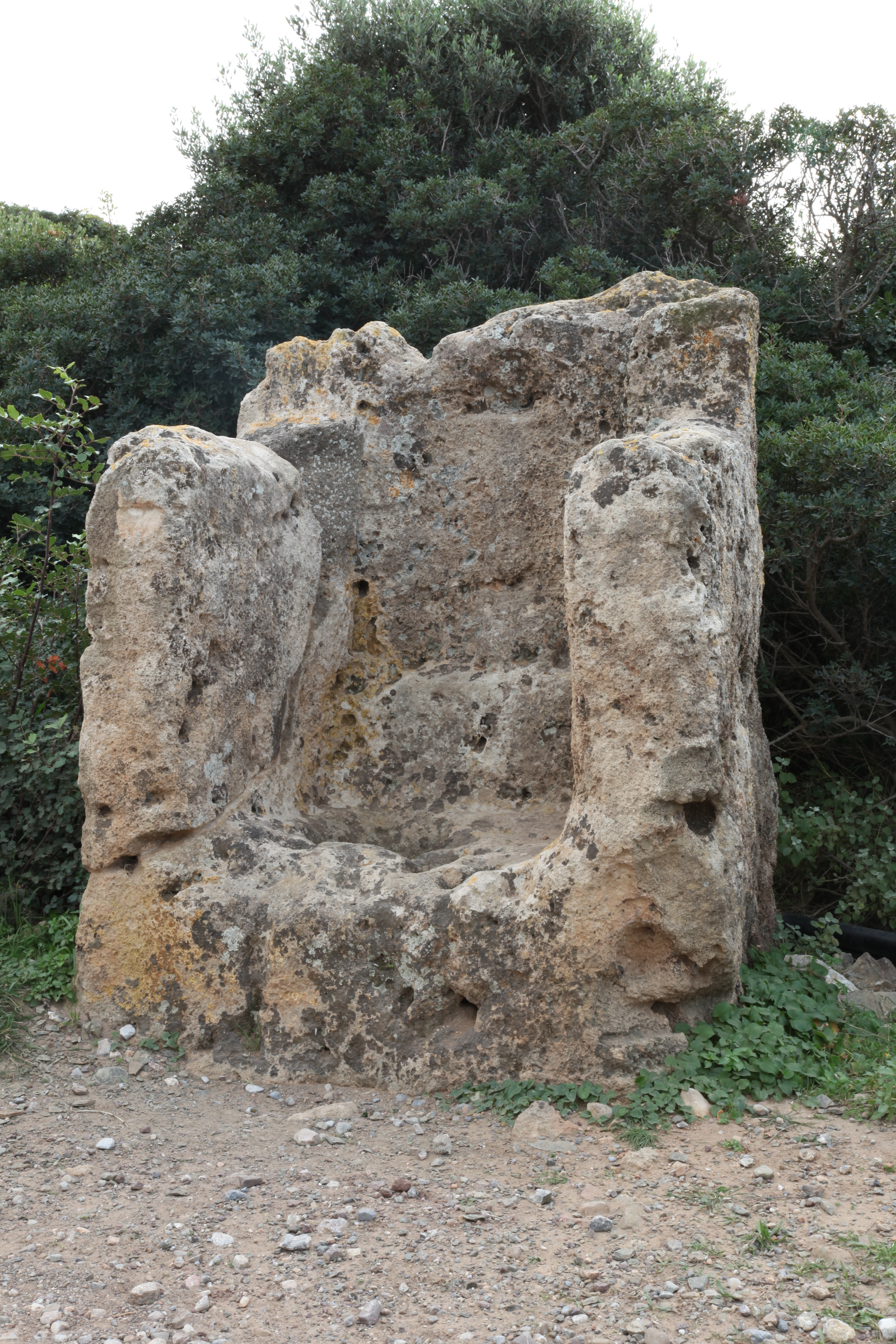
Ancient throne from Phalasarna

Rescue excavations at the cemetery of Falasarna began in 1966 directed by the Ephor of the Department of Classical Antiquities in Chania, Dr. Yannis Tzedakis, and continued under Vanna Niniou-Kindeli. Over 70 graves were uncovered, some of them pithos burials, and others cist graves. The early excavations were important, proving the site to have been inhabited in the 6th century BC. Since then, a small additional part of the cemetery has been excavated and many beautiful artifacts have been recovered, among them a 4th-century pelike showing Eros chasing a Maenad. In the area of the necropolis there stands a two-meter high throne carved from stone, probably dedicated to the Phoenician goddess Astarte.

Research excavations began in 1986 under Dr. Elpida Hadjidaki of the Greek Archaeological Service of Chania. From 1988 through 1990 they were done in collaboration with Frank J. Frost of the University of California, Santa Barbara, and have continued under the direction of Hadjidaki. Major items excavated to date include five towers that were part of the fortifications encircling the harbor. All of them have a distinctive rounded molding (Ancient Greek: κυμάτιον) at a point where the foundation narrows to support the upper part of the monument. One tower is circular, preserved to a height of 4.5 m (15 ft), strengthened inside by two cross-walls filled with rubble, and connected through a 50 m-long (160 ft) curtain wall to a rectangular tower. The other fortification towers surrounding the port are also rectangular, and the stones of their exterior faces have drafted edges. A fortified gate was connected to walls that in one direction surround a secondary basin behind the main military harbor, and in another direction extend towards the acropolis. This wall ends in another rectangular tower. From this point a paved road departs for the acropolis, and right next to it is a room filled with stone baths. The secondary basin is lined by a quay 30 m (98 ft) long with a slipway at one end, and a row of structures at the other that the excavator suggests may be more slipways.

Long sections of the quays in the military harbor have been excavated with six bollards in situ, still bearing rope marks from mooring ships. An artificial channel connected the military harbor to the sea, and it was possible to close the channel using a chain. A carved stone structure at the channel entrance, excavated in 2013 and still displaying traces of bronze, supports this view.

A merchant's house has partly been excavated at the foot of the acropolis, revealing imported goods of the early Hellenistic period from around the Mediterranean, particularly from Cyrenaica in North Africa. Finally, a winery and adjoining warehouses excavated between 2008 and 2012 provide evidence of production for export.

The excavations have uncovered a wide variety of ceramic vessels, coins, jewelry, and sculpture, revealing well developed culture of the inhabitants of ancient Phalasarna. Many of these are on display in the museums of Kisamos and Chania.

== Situated Simulation ==
Between 2010 and 2015, Gunnar Liestøl of the University of Oslo in collaboration with Elpida Hadjidaki developed a quasi-mixed reality simulation of ancient Falasarna. It contains three visual layers: one for the present day, one recreating Phalasarna as it appeared when constructed in 333 B.C., and one describing the Roman attack of 69 B.C.

== LCT wreck ==
At the point where the ancient channel entrance to the Hellenistic port meets the sea, there is a wreck from the Second World War of a Mark 1 Landing Craft, Tank. It was sunk on 28 May 1941 during the Battle of Crete. The history of this vessel, partly based on interviews of local residents of Falasarna and the Captain, John Sutton, has been described by Michael Bendon. A preview of a situated simulation depicting the sinking of this Landing Craft has been prepared by Gunnar Liestøl, Michael Bendon, and the Director of Falasarna excavations Elpida Hadjidaki.
