= Ellopium =

Town in ancient Aetolia

Ellopium or Ellopion (Ancient Greek: Ἐλλόπιον) was a town in ancient Aetolia.
