= Skopelos (town) =

Skopelos Σκόπελος
- Community
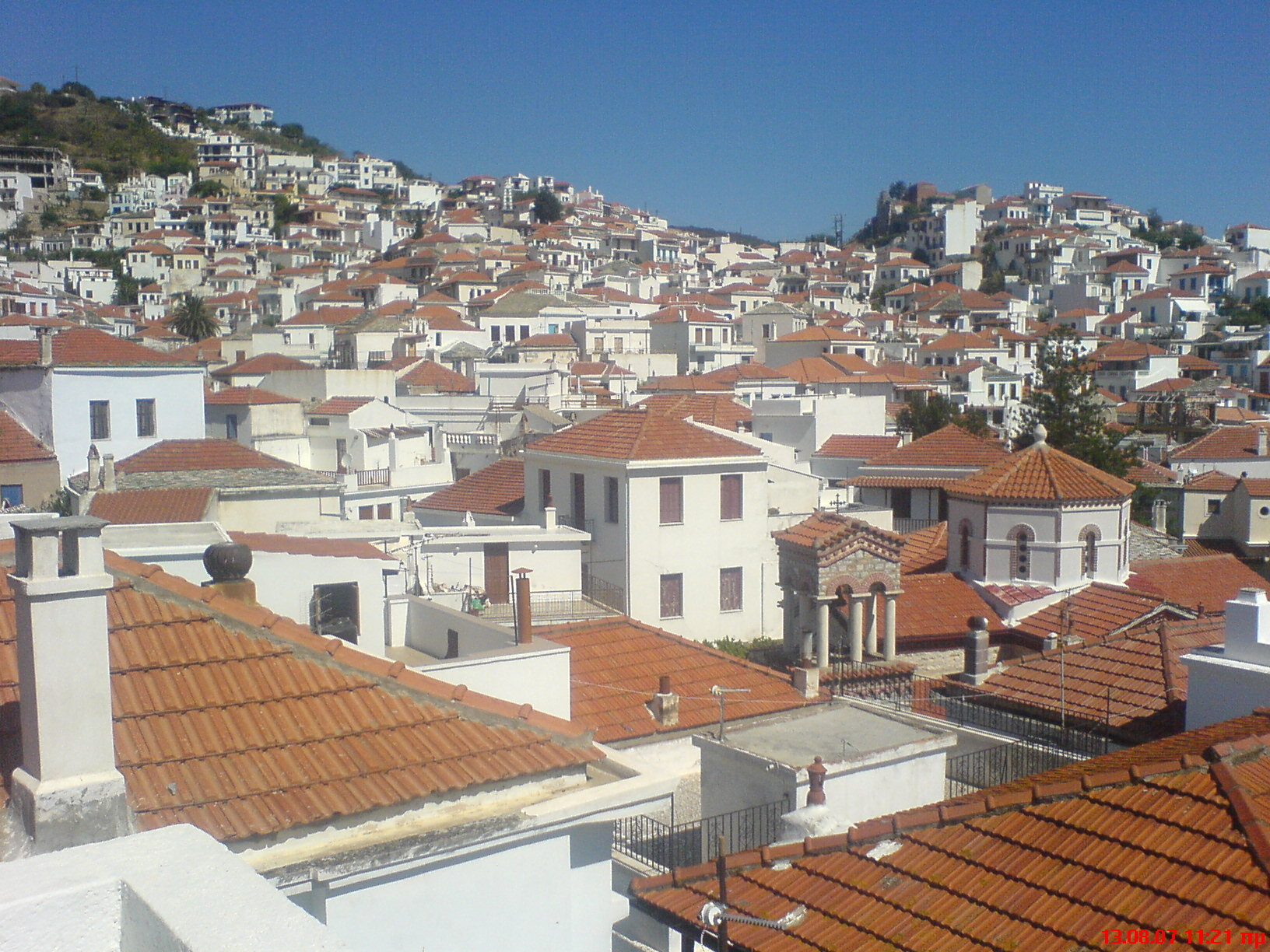
- View of Skopelos

- Location within Greece
- Coordinates: 39°7′N 23°43′E
- Country: Greece
- Administrative region: Thessaly
- Regional unit: Sporades
- Municipality: Skopelos
- Highest elevation: 681 m (2,234 ft)
- Lowest elevation: 0 m (0 ft)

Population (2021)
  - Community: 3,089
- Time zone: UTC+2 (EET)
  - Summer (DST): UTC+3 (EEST)
- Postal code: 370 03
- Area code: 24240
- Vehicle registration: ΒΟ
- Website: www.skopelos.gr

Skopelos (Greek: Σκόπελος) is the main town on the island of Skopelos. The island is located east of mainland Greece, northeast of the island of Euboea and is part of the regional unit of the Sporades in the region of Thessaly. It has a port and a small heliport.

== History ==
In island legend Skopelos was founded by Staphylos (Greek for grape), one of the sons of the god Dionysos and the Princess Ariadne of Crete. Historically, in the Late Bronze Age Skopelos, then known as Peparethos, was colonized by Cretans who introduced viticulture to the island. In antiquity, the ancient city of Peparethus or Peparethos (Ancient Greek: Πεπάρηθος) was located on the site of Skopelos town. Peparethus was a member of the Delian League. The ancient city suffered from an earthquake during the Peloponnesian War (426 BCE). In 207 BCE, Philip V of Macedon sent a garrison to the city of Peparethus, to defend it against the Romans; but he destroyed it in 200 BCE, that it might not fall into the hands of the latter.

== Economy ==
The economy of Skopelos is now fully dependent on the tourism industry which supports construction and other development related industries. Though tourism is greatest during the summer months, Skopelos is also a year-round retirement destination for Northern Europeans. Agriculture, once a staple of the local economy, is in decline though 2006 was a good year for olive oil production in Skopelos.

== Transportation ==
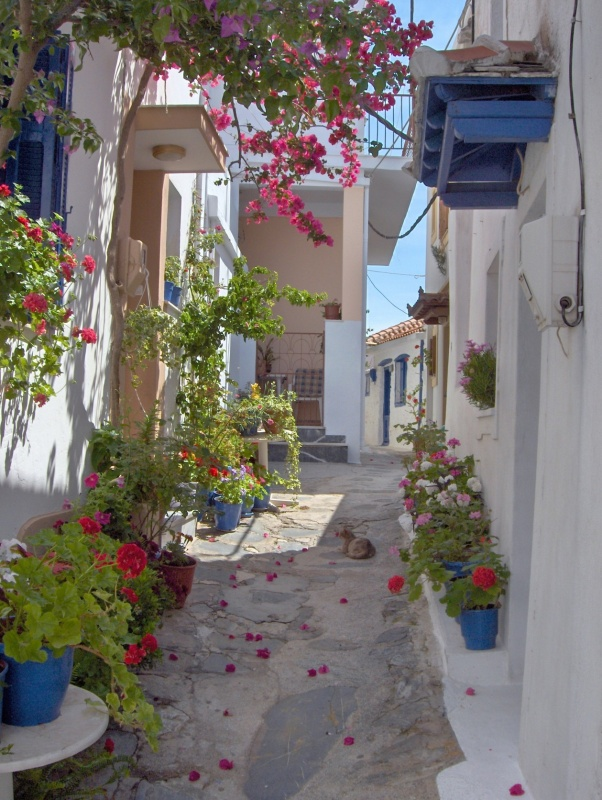
A traditional street.

Automobile ownership in Greece between 1990 and 2004 increased by 121%. Skopelos reflects this trend and the local authorities are hard-pressed to deal with the increased traffic and parking issues. Along with the resident population of automobiles, the burden of tourist and summer resident vehicles and the availability of rental cars and motorbikes has created problems for which the local government has not yet found solutions. The construction of a large asphalt parking area along the waterfront in the late 1990s has done little to address the parking problems facing the town of Skopelos in the summer. During the summer the population of the island increases from about 5,000 to between 15,000 and 20,000 (est. 1993).

== Architectural heritage ==
The town of Skopelos was honored as a Traditional Settlement of Outstanding Beauty (19/10/1978 Presidential Decree 594,13-11/78, signed by President of Greece Konstantinos Tsatsos). This is the Greek equivalent of a site of Outstanding Architectural Inheritance. The building code for new construction and renovation within the village reflects some restrictions due to the Traditional Settlement decree. Some restrictions stipulate that no new buildings shall be of more than two stories, there must be a sloped ceramic or stone roof in the traditional style, and doors, windows and balconies be made of wood.

=== Churches ===
The island has more than 360 churches and chapels. Most are closed through the year except for the feast day of whom or whatever the church has been dedicated. Most have been privately built. The oldest existing ecclesiastical structure is the basilica of Agios Athanasios built in the 11th century and located in the Kastro area. All except one of the churches on the island observe the Greek Orthodox faith. The remaining church hosts a small enclave of Jehovah's Witnesses. Christianity was formalized in Skopelos by the appointment of the Bishop Riginos in the 4th Century A.D. Under the Reign of the Emperor Julian the Apostate, Riginos was martyred in 362 A.D. The saint's feast day is February 25 - a holiday on the island.

== Notable people ==
- Hagnon of Peparethus, Olympic victor in 568 BC
- Diocles of Peparethus, ancient Greek historian
- Ellopion of Peparethus, ancient Greek philosopher
