= Euthymius (disambiguation) =

Euthymius or Euthymios (Greek: Εὐθύμιος) may refer to:

== Saints ==
- Euthymius of Perugia, father of Saint Crescentius of Rome
- Euthymius the Great (377–473), abbot in Palestine
- Euthymius of Sardis (died 831), Metropolitan of Sardis, Confessor
- Euthymius the Younger (died 898), monk and hermit who lived on Mount Athos
- Euthymius the Athonite (c. 955 – c. 1024), Georgian monk, philosopher, and scholar
- Euthymius of Tarnovo (1325–1402), Patriarch of Bulgaria
- Euthymius II of Novgorod (died 1458), Archbishop of Novgorod
- Euthymius of Dečani, 16th century Serbian monk and martyr
- Euthymios Agritellis (1876–1921), Greek Orthodox Bishop of Zela, in Amasya, Western Pontus, New Ethno-Hieromartyr

== Christian patriarchs ==
- Euphemius of Constantinople (died c. 515), also called Euthymius, Patriarch of Constantinople 490–496
- Euthymius I of Constantinople (c. 834 – 917), Ecumenical Patriarch of Constantinople 907–912
- Euthymius I of Antioch, Melkite Patriarch of Antioch c. 1159 – c. 1164
- Euthymius II of Antioch, Melkite Patriarch of Antioch c. 1268 – c. 1269
- Euthymius II of Constantinople (died 1416), Ecumenical Patriarch of Constantinople 1410–1416
- Euthymius II Karmah (1572–1635), Melkite Patriarch of Antioch 1634–1635
- Euthymius III of Chios (died 1647), Melkite Patriarch of Antioch 1635–1647
- Euthymius V of Antioch, Greek Orthodox Patriarch of Antioch 1792–1813

== Other people ==
- Euthymius of Constantinople (11th century), monk
- Euthymios Zigabenos, 12th century monk and commentator on the Bible
- Euthymios Malakes (c. 1115 – before 1204), Greek Orthodox Metropolitan of Neopatras
- Euthymios Tornikios (fl. 1181–1222), Byzantine ecclesiastical official and writer
- Euthymius I of Novgorod, Archbishop of Novgorod 1423–1429
- Euthymios Saifi (1643–1723), Melkite Catholic bishop of Tyre and Sidon
- Euthymius Moiseyev (born 1972), Russian Orthodox Bishop of Lukhovitsy
