= Gönül Bridge =

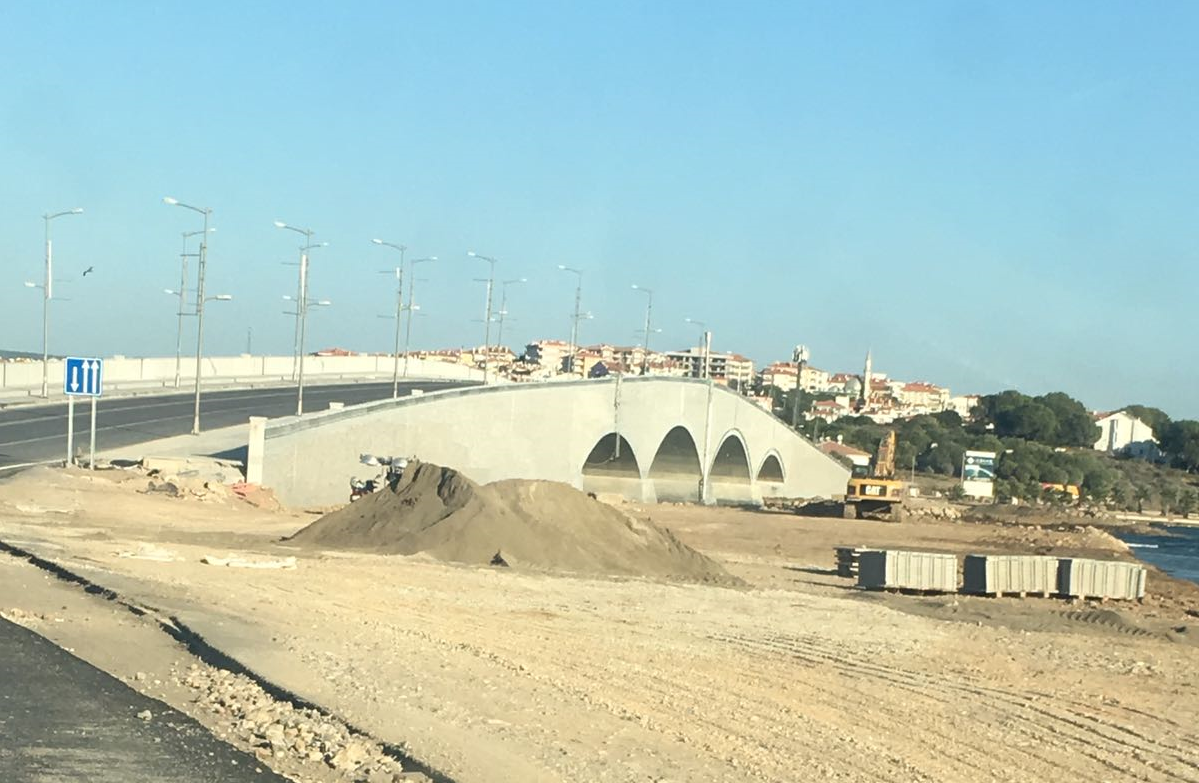
- Gönül Bridge in August 2017.
- Coordinates: 39°20′38″N 26°41′04″E
- Crosses: Bay of Ayvalık

Characteristics
- Total length: 300 m (980 ft)
- Width: 20 m (66 ft)

History
- Construction start: June 2016
- Construction cost: $4.2 million
- Opened: 15 April 2017
- Replaces: Ayvalık-Cunda causeway

Statistics
- Toll: None

Location
- Interactive map of Gönül Bridge

Gönül Bridge (Turkish: Gönül Köprüsü), also known as Cunda Bridge (Turkish: Cunda Köprüsü) is a 300 m (980 ft) long solid-arch bridge that crosses the Ayvalık Bay in Ayvalık, Turkey. The bridge connects mainland Anatolia to Lale Island, which in turn connects to Cunda Island via the Ayvalık Strait Bridge.

The bridge replaced a causeway, built in 1964, in order to open up natural water flow into the Aegean Sea. Construction of the bridge started on 6 June 2016 and was expected to be complete by 6 December 2016 at a cost of $2.8 million (₺10 million). However, due to geological problems, the opening was delayed by four months and the cost increased to $4.2 million (₺15 million), with the addition of 277 new bores.

The length of the stone bridge will be 300 metres (980 ft) with a width of 20 metres (66 ft) and will consist of four stone arches. Along with the two lanes for automobile traffic, the bridge will also include lanes for pedestrian and bicycle traffic.
