= Euthymius of Constantinople =

Euthymius of Constantinople may refer to:

- Euphemius of Constantinople, also called Euthymius, Ecumenical Patriarch in 490–496
- Euthymius I of Constantinople, Ecumenical Patriarch in 907–912
- Euthymius of Constantinople (11th century) (fl. 1050)
- Euthymius II of Constantinople, Ecumenical Patriarch in 1410–1416
