= Constantine Tornikios =

Constantine Tornikios or Tornikes (Greek: Κωνσταντῖνος Τορνίκιος/Τορνίκης) was a general and one of the most senior officials during the reign of the Byzantine emperor Alexios III Angelos (r. 1195–1203).

== Life ==
He was a descendant of the prominent Tornikios family, of Armenian or Georgian origin. His father, Demetrios Tornikios, maternal nephew of Theophylact of Ohrid, was a prominent official who rose to become logothetes tou dromou (postal logothete, in effect foreign minister), a post he continuously occupied from circa 1191 until his death, and sebastos of Isaac II Angelos. He was the elder brother of Euthymios Tornikios, his mother was an unknown Malakissa, sister of Euthymios Malakes, and he was likely brother of Irene (Herina or Eirene), the first wife of Isaac II.

Constantine is first mentioned as being involved in the riots that broke out in the imperial capital, Constantinople, in late 1198 or 1199. Originally, the mob protested against the crimes of the head of the capital's prison (the praetorium), John Lagos, but soon it turned into a full-scale rebellion against Alexios III, which had to be bloodily suppressed. At the time, Constantine was eparch (governor or prefect) of the capital. In 1200 or 1201, after his father's death, Constantine succeeded him as logothetes tou dromou for a couple of years, before being replaced by Niketas Choniates. He was also a sebastos.

Constantine's own son, also named Demetrios, became mesazon (chief minister) in the Empire of Nicaea, and his grandson Constantine was named to the high rank of sebastokrator.

== Sources ==
- Brand, Charles M. (1968). Byzantium Confronts the West, 1180–1204. Cambridge, Massachusetts: Harvard University Press. LCCN 67-20872. OCLC 795121713.
- Kazhdan, Alexander (1991). "Tornikios". In Kazhdan, Alexander (ed.). The Oxford Dictionary of Byzantium. Oxford and New York: Oxford University Press. pp. 2096–2097. ISBN 0-19-504652-8.
