= Taxiarches Church =

Greek Orthodox church in Turkey

Coordinates: 39.3337°N 26.6583°E

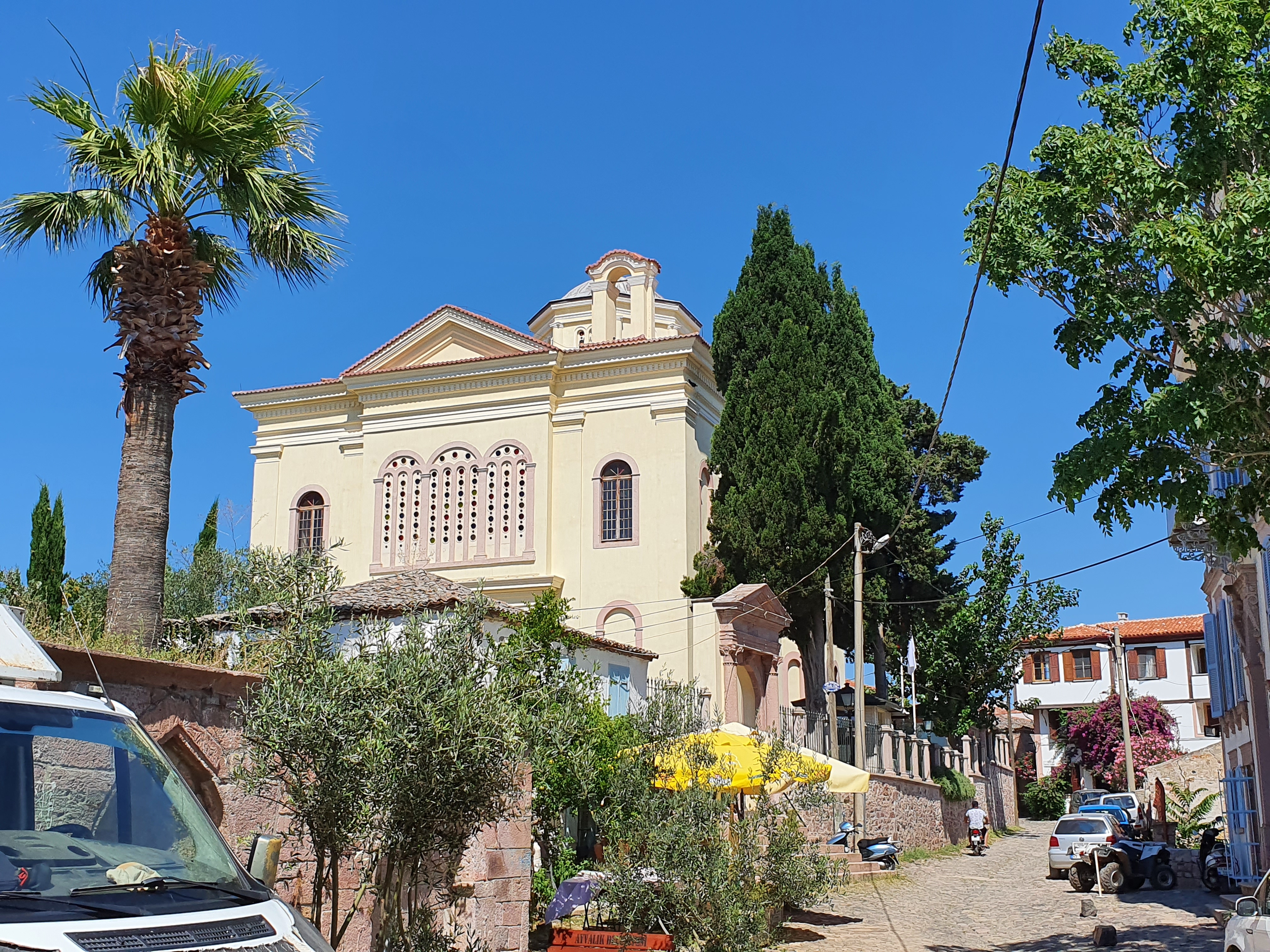
The Taxiarchs´ Church

The Church of the Archangels or Taxiarchs' Church (Turkish: Taksiyarhis Kilisesi) is a historically significant Greek Orthodox church, dating back to 1873 and located in Cunda Island of the Ayvalık district in Turkey—an area formerly inhabited primarily by Greeks. Following the massacres of local Greeks during the Greek genocide and the Pontic Greek genocide between 1914 and 1923, and the subsequent expulsion of the survivors, the building nowadays houses one of the Rahmi M. Koç museums.

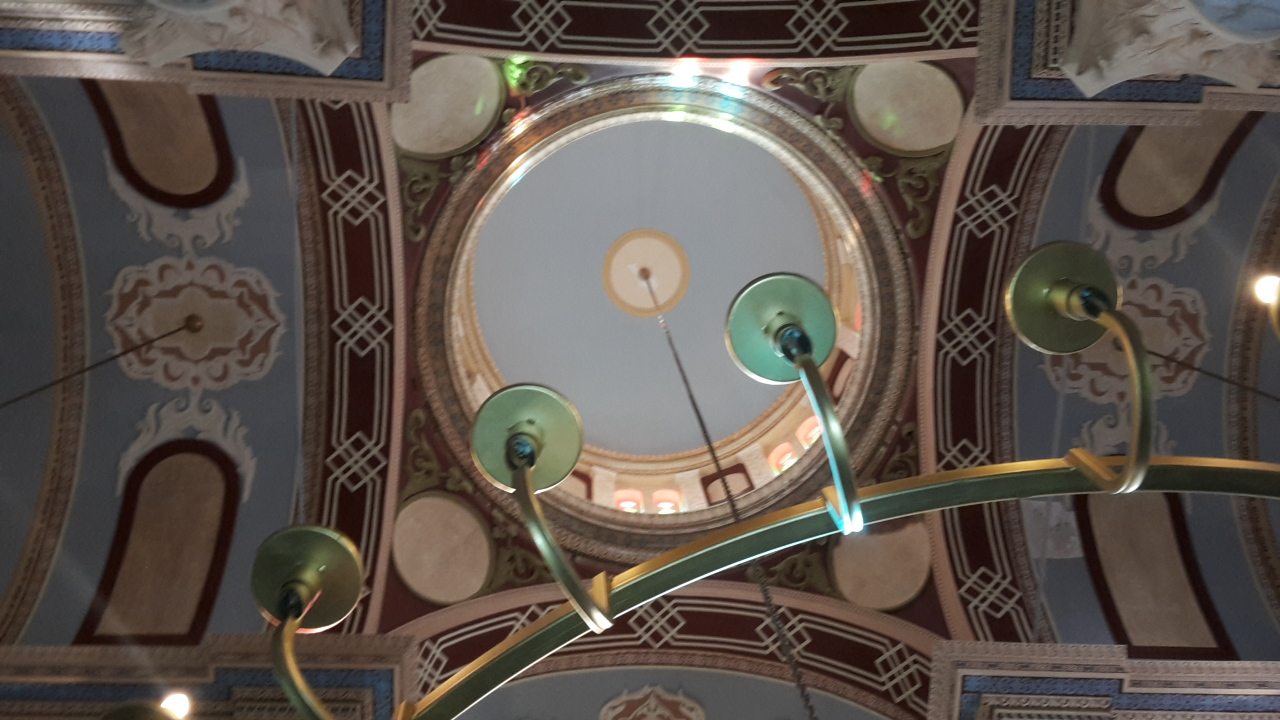
Cupola of the Taxiarchs' Church

The Taxiarchs' Church was built in 1873 by local Ottoman Greeks. Following the massacres of Greeks in the province and their final expulsion during the population exchange in 1923, the bell from the church tower was used during the Second World War to sound alarms and convey information to the public. The churches on the island were looted and turned into warehouses and stables, the lamps and holy images in them were broken, paintings of art destroyed and houses rendered uninhabitable. For a short period from 1921 to 1922, the island was the see of a Greek Orthodox metropolitan bishop, while the neoclassical mansion of the last metropolitan, Ambrosios Pleianthidis, who was executed by the Turkish army, still survives on the seafront of the island's town center.

It was later discovered that the church's bell was one of the largest in the world. The bell is housed in the Pergamon Museum in Berlin, Germany.
