= Euthymios Agritellis =

Bishop of the Diocese of Zela (1876–1921)

Saint Euthymios of Zela Ἅγιος Εὐθύμιος Ζήλων
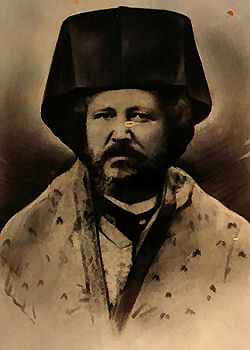

Bishop of Zela New Ethno-Hieromartyr
- Born: July 6, 1876; Parakila, Lesbos (modern-day Greece)
- Died: 29 May 1921 (aged 44); Amasya, Ottoman Empire (modern-day Amasya, Turkey)
- Venerated in: Eastern Orthodox Church
- Canonized: November 4, 1992, by Church of Greece. (Note: On 4 November 1992, the Holy Synod of the Church of Greece unanimously declared Bp. Chrysostomos of Smyrna (†1922) an ethnomartyr and a saint of the Orthodox Church, to be jointly commemorated on the Sunday before the Feast of the Elevation of the Holy Cross, together with four other Holy Hierarchs of Asia Minor including: Bp. Ambrosios of Moschonisia (†1922); Bp. Euthymios (Agritellis) of Zela (†1921); Bp. Gregorios of Kydonies (†1922); and; Bp. Procopius of Iconium.; Their ranking to the chorus of the Saints, was formally announced in: Encyclical 2556, of 5 July 1993, of the Holy Synod of the Church of Greece; (in Greek) Εγκύκλιος 2556 της 5ης Ιουλίου 1993 της Ιεράς Συνόδου της Εκκλησίας της Ελλάδος).)
- Major shrine: Leimonos Monastery, Lesbos.
- Feast: May 29; Sunday before the Exaltation of the Holy Cross (September 7–13)

Saint Euthymios of Zela the Ethno-Hieromartyr, (Greek: Ὁ Ἅγιος Εὐθύμιος ὁ Ἱερομάρτυρας Ἐπίσκοπος Ζήλων), born Eustratios Agritellis, 1876–1921, was the last resident bishop of the Diocese of Zela, near Amasia, Western Pontus, which he served from June 12, 1912, until his death on May 29, 1921, during the period of the Greek genocide. (Note: Thereafter, the Diocese of Zela became a titular see. Some of the titular bishops of Zela have been: Alexander (Semenoff-Tian-Chansky) of Zela (1971–1979); Kallistos (Samaras) of Zela (1980–1991); Sotirios (Trambas) of Zela (1993–2004); Ambrose (Zographos) of Zela (2006–2008); Sevastianos (Skordallos) of Zela (2011–present))

His memory is celebrated on May 29 as well as on the Sunday before the Exaltation of the Holy Cross.

== Early life ==
Saint Euthymios was born on July 6, 1876, in the village of Parakila on Lesbos island, where he started his education. At the age of nine he entered the 'Leimonias school', located within the Leimonos Monastery, from where he graduated in 1892. (Note: Founded in 1526 by Ignatios Agallianos, who is celebrated today as a saint by the Greek Orthodox Church, the Monastery of Leimon (Leimonos Monastery) has played a very significant role in the church history of Lesbos island, at the centre of which it is located. The 'Leimonias school' was the first school to be established on Lesbos after the occupation of the island by the Ottoman Turks (1462-1912), and for quite a long period it was the only one that existed.)

In the meantime, he was tonsured a monk by the Hegumen of the monastery, Archmandrite Anthimos (Georgiellis), who gave him the name Euthymios. For the next eight years he practiced asceticism in the Leimonos Monastery.

In 1900 he was sent by the monastery to the Theological School of Halki, where he studied from 1900 to 1907. In 1906 he was ordained a deacon by Metropolitan Agathangelos of Grevena, and in 1907 he completed his thesis entitled: "The purpose of monastic life in the East until the 9th century AD."

After his graduation, he returned to Lesbos, where Metropolitan Stephen (Soulidis) of Methymna appointed him the head of the Leimonos School, as well as the itinerant preacher (hierokeryx) of the Metropolis of Methymna. He performed this role between 1909-1910, during which time he was known for his prowess as an orator and the rich content of his sermons. In the 1909-10 school year, he served as headmaster in the municipality of Gera, in the region of Mytilene.

In 1910 he was ordained a priest by Metropolitan Stephen (Soulidis) of Methymna, and served as the protosynkellos of the Metropolis of Methymna until 1912.

In 1912 the Metropolitan of Amasya Germanos Karavangelis (based in Samsun), who was himself a native of Lesbos, received Euthymios as his general commissioner. It is said that the Ecumenical Patriarch himself Joachim III first introduced Euthymios to Metropolitan Germanos, having been informed of the talents of the young clergyman. Thus the Great Church of Christ promoted Euthymios as assistant bishop to the Metropolitan of Amasya, bestowing upon him the illustrious high title of old, of Western Pontus, that of Bishop of Zela (modern Zile). His ordination to the highest order of the Church took place on June 12, 1912, in Constantinople.

== Bishop of Zela ==
Over the next ten years, in the midst of adverse and tragic circumstances, Bishop Euthymios served the vast Metropolis of Amasya, which was the most extensive in Asia Minor, comprising 340 Orthodox communities and a population of over 130,000 Orthodox, who were mostly Turkish in appearance, but Greek in identity. He largely governed the Metropolis of Amasya alone, due to the frequent trips of Metropolitan Germanos to Constantinople and Athens. During his tenure the Metropolis of Amasya started to show signs of unusual progress and revival, including the formation of youth and community organizations. In 1913 in the district of Pafra and in several villages of Western Pontus, he founded many churches, schools for boys, schools for girls, and took care to ensure the proper placement of priests and teachers.

However a short time thereafter, the great persecution of the Anatolian Greeks erupted, especially in the regions of Samsun and Pafra. (Note: "Pontian and Anatolian Greeks were victims of a broader Turkish genocidal project aimed at all Christian minorities in the Ottoman Empire. A total of more than 3.5 million Greeks, Armenians, and Assyrians were killed under the successive regimes of the Young Turks and of Mustafa Kemal from roughly 1914 to 1923. Of this, as many as 1.5 million Greeks may have died.") From then on the activities of the Bishop of Zela changed from efforts for progress and revival, into struggles for relief and retrenchment. He transitioned untiringly from place to place, oftentimes in danger and tried by deprivations and malaise, in order to provide his assistance to those he found in despair or in exile, and to the distressed Orthodox Christians.

=== Adversity and war ===
Throughout the First World War he urged all of the schools and the people of Pontus to remain united in remembrance of an annual ethnic ceremony which commemorated the female mass suicide of 30-40 young girls from the village of Hazar in 1680, who preferred to fall from a fortress (known as the 'fortress of Ali') into a 150-meter precipice, rather than to fall into the hands of the Turks. This ceremony was observed on the anniversary of March 25th each year in remembrance of the self-sacrifice of the young girls. (Note: Due to a campaign by the forces of Hassan Ali Bey to capture young girls in order to send them to the slave markets of Anatolia, in 1680 a large number of women and young girls entered into the fortress of Ali (later called "Kızkalesi" - "Maiden's castle"), in order to escape being taken and enslaved. After being besieged for 48 days, some of them lost their senses, others died of hunger and thirst, and others escaped secretly and surrendered to the forces of the derebey, since they could no longer withstand the hardships. However one group of 30-40 young girls, unwilling to be captured, climbed to the highest summit of the fortress, from where they fell and committed suicide. After these events took place in the region of Pafra, an uprising of a number of courageous Greeks took place who climbed the surrounding mountains and armed themselves, making reprisals on the forces of the derebey, undertaking an unequal but virtuous struggle against the Turkish oppressors. A Greek dance that was danced in Pafra in order to commemorate the 30-40 young girls from the village of Hazar who preferred to fall into the 150 meter precipice – is variously known as the: 'Thanati Laggeman' (Θανατί Λάγγεμαν) – "Death Jump"; or; 'Kizlar Choplamasi' (Κιζλάρ Χοπλαμασί) – which in Turkish means "The Girls' Jump"; or; 'Kizlar Kaïtesi' (Κιζλάρ Καϊτεσί) - "the musical purpose of the girls"; The dance portrays the movements of the girls as they jumped into the void to meet death on the steep and sharp rocks. The musical instruments that were used were the flute (ζουρνάς) with the Davul (νταούλι), and the Lyre (λύρα) to a lesser extent. A similar mass female suicide took place in Eprius in 1803, known as the Dance of Zalongo.)

In April 1917 a large force of the Turkish army sent by Refet Bele Pasha and commanded by Mehmet Ali encircled the monastery of the Theotokos near the village of Otkaya (Otkayada), on the west side of Mount Neltes (Nebyan), where the cave called Maara (or the Virgin or Magara) was located, encircling 650 women and children and 60 armed rebels. After six days of resistance most of the besieged were killed or committed suicide. Of those that were captured many of the young girls and women were raped, the children shot, and the men beheaded.

In 1919, in response to this act, on the forefeast of the Dormition of the Theotokos, Euthymios gathered 12,000 insurgents outside of the small town of Çağşur (Esençay), under the command of Kyriakos Papadopoulos, (Note: For a discussion of Kyriakos Papadopoulos, see: (in Greek) Αντώνης Ι. Ζαρκανέλας (Πρ. Γενικός Διεθυντής Ανάπτυξης, Νομαρχίας Θεσσαλονίκης). Ο Κισάμπατζακ (Κυριάκος Παπαδόπουλος) ο αρχηγός. Katerini News. Retrieved: 13 August 2014.) resulting in the complete destruction of the Turkish armed forces and the town. From that day onwards Euthymios was considered a wanted man by the Kemalist Turks who viewed him as a leader of the insurgents of Western Pontus. He and other notables were restricted in their activities and suffered due to the interrogations they underwent. The jails were filled with Christians of every age and social status. Everywhere there was exile, the gallows, disgrace, and the sword and fire.

In 1921, by a decision of the Kemalist government, all the Metropolitans, Bishops, and Archimandrites of the Pontus region were obliged to abandon Pontus and leave their seats. The only hierarchs who did not obey this order were Metropolitan Chrysanthos (Philippidis) of Trebizond, Bishop Euthymios of Zela, and Protosyngellos Archimandrite Platon (Aivazidis) of Amasya.

=== Imprisonment and martyrdom ===
On January 21, 1921, the Kemalists captured Bishop Euthymios and Archimandrite Platon (Aivazidis), along with many other notables of the city of Amasya. They were condemned to death, and were imprisoned in the Souyia prison in Amasya.

Aware of the ill-treatments and tortures of those arrested with him, and desiring to relieve their suffering, he appealed to the Kemalist government of Ankara to be regarded as the only culprit, and to be the only one punished, in order to allow his fellow prisoners to be released. However he received no response.

His imprisonment continued relatively mildly until April 18, 1921, the day of Pascha. On that day, without being noticed by the jailer, he entered a hall where many expatriates were being detained in isolation, in order to console and encourage them. As a result of this action he became even more suspect, and was isolated in the damp basements of the jails from then onwards. It was through the testimony of other prisoners that were released, that his tortures were made publicly known afterwards, affirming his isolation and sufferings in prison. Sometimes his voice would be heard chanting the memorial service for the repose of departed, which he was chanting on his own behalf.

On the forty-first day of his isolation, on May 29, 1921, completely exhausted from the hardships, deprivations and tortures, he died in custody. It was the irony of fate that his conviction from the high court in Ankara arrived after his death, with the sentence being the 'Independence of death'. Nevertheless, his dead body was hanged in the central square of the town together with the others who had been sentenced to death including politicians, businessmen, journalists and religious figures of the local Greek community. (Note: "...sentenced to death 177 Greeks who were executed. Included among them was Zelon Euthemios, assistant bishop of Amassea, who died in prison from typhus, ...he ordered even the dead to be hanged with the others. Also sentenced to death in absentia were 44 Greeks...") Afterwards his guardians buried him quietly in the courtyard of the adjacent church.

On May 30, 1936, on the fifteenth anniversary of his martyrdom, the Leimonos Monastery in Lesbos celebrated the unveiling of his bust. Since then the white likeness of his image reminds pilgrims of the sacrifice of a shepherd who laid down his life for the sheep and remained faithful unto death.

== Glorification ==
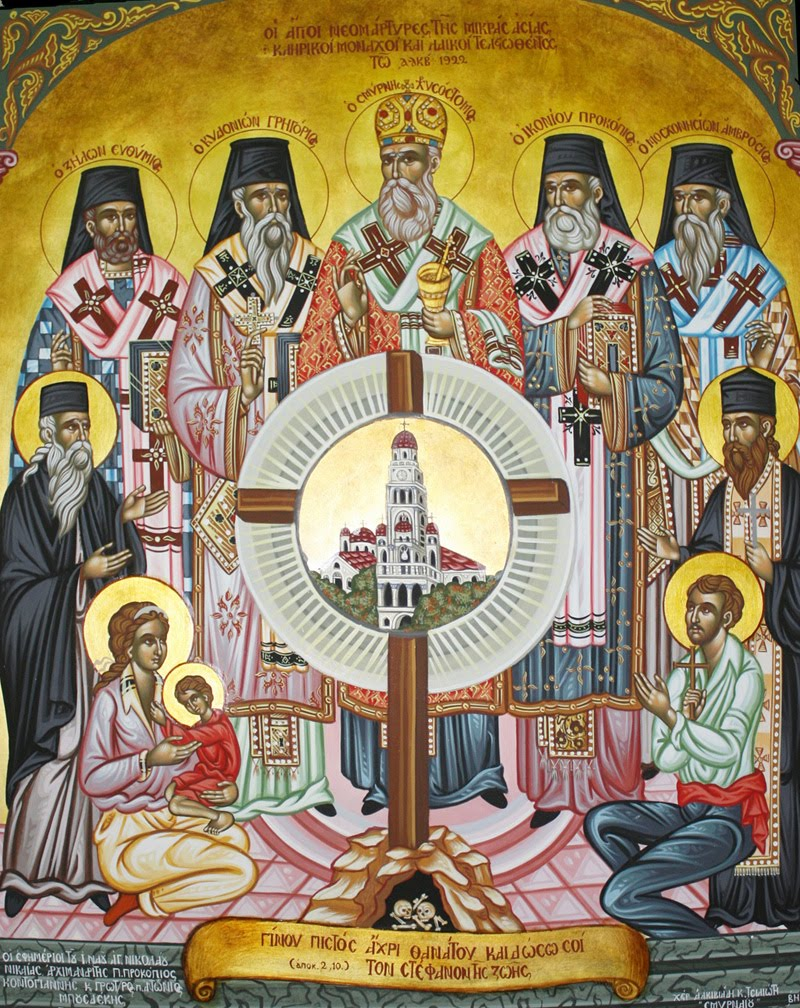
St. Chrysostomos of Smyrna and the Hierarchs with Him, Together With Clergy and Laity, Massacred in the Asia Minor Catastrophe. From left to right; Saint Euthymios of Zila, Grigorios of Kydonia, Chrysostomos of Smyrna, Procopius of Iconium, Ambrosios of Moschonisia

In 1992 Euthymios was numbered among the chorus of the Saints by the Holy Synod of the Church of Greece.

In 1998 a chapel was built in honour of the Saint at Leimonos Monastery, in the Holy Metropolis of Methymna.

Among the manuscripts at Leimonos Monastery, there are fifty items written in his hand, most of which are notebooks from the time of his studies in Halki.

Eastern Orthodox Church titles
| Unknown | Bishop of Zela (Amasya); June 12, 1912 – May 29, 1921 | Succeeded by (Titular see) |

== See also ==
- Amasya trials
- Greek genocide
- Euthymius (disambiguation)

== Sources ==
- Great Synaxaristes: (in Greek) Ὁ Ἅγιος Εὐθύμιος ὁ Ἱερομάρτυρας Ἐπίσκοπος Ζήλων. ΜΕΓΑΣ ΣΥΝΑΞΑΡΙΣΤΗΣ. 29 Μαΐου.
- (in Greek) Αθαν. Γ. Τσερνογλου. "Εὐθύμιος. Ὁ Ἀγριτέλλης. Έθνομάρτυς ἐπίσκοπος Ζήλων Ἀμασείας (1912-1921)." Θρησκευτική και Ηθική Εγκυκλοπαίδεια (ΘΗΕ). Τόμος 5 (Διοκλητιανός-Ζώτος). Αθηναι – Αθαν. Μαρτινος, 1964. σελ. 1046–1048.
- St. Efthymios Agritellis. Holy Patriarchal and Stavropegial Leimonos Monastery. Retrieved: 12 August 2014.
