= June 11 (Eastern Orthodox liturgics) =

Day in the Eastern Orthodox liturgical calendar

Eastern Orthodox liturgical calendar
June 10	June 11	June 12
June 11 O.S. ≍ June 24 N.S. June 11 N.S ≍ May 29 O.S.

An Eastern Orthodox cross

June 11 in Eastern Orthodox liturgical calendars is a feast day and a day of commemoration of saints and martyrs. Although some Orthodox churches use the Revised Julian Calendar and others use the traditional Julian calendar, the fixed commemorations for their respective June 11 are broadly the same, no matter which calendar is used. (Note: Despite the dates being the same, the days to which they refer typically differ by 13 days. The notation Old Style or O.S. is sometimes used to indicate a date in the traditional Julian Calendar (the "Old Calendar"). The notation New Style or N.S. indicates a date in the Revised Julian calendar (the "New Calendar").)

== Saints ==
- Holy Apostles Bartholomew and Barnabas (1st century) (Note: "THE birthday of the apostle St. Barnabas, born in Cyprus. By the disciples, he was ordained apostle of the Gentiles with St. Paul, and with him traversed many regions, fulfilling his commission to preach the Gospel. At length he went to Cyprus, where he ennobled his apostolate by a glorious martyrdom. Through his own revelation his body was found, in the time of the emperor Zeno, together with a copy of St. Matthew's gospel copied with his own hand.") (Note: Name days celebrated today include: Bartholomew, Bartholomeus (Βαρθολομαῖος); Barnabas, Varnavas (Βαρνάβας).)
- Martyr Theopemptus and four others, by the sword.

== Pre-Schism Western saints ==
- Saints Felix and Fortunatus, two brothers, born in Vicenza in Italy, who suffered under Diocletian in Aquileia (296) (Note: "At Aquileia, the martyrdom of the saints Feilx and Fortunatus, brothers. In the persecution of Diocletian and Maximian, they were racked, and had flaming torches held against their sides. These being extinguished by the power of God, boiling oil was poured over them, and as they persevered in confessing Christ, they were decapitated.")
- Saint Blitharius (Blier), born in Scotland, he went to France and settled in Seganne in Champagne (7th century)
- Saint Herebald (Herband), born in Britain, he lived as a hermit in Brittany where a church is dedicated to him (8th century) (Note: "HEREBALD, or HERBAUD, was a native of Great Britain, and, as it seems from his name, of an English family. He was granted to the earnest prayers of his parents, who had been long married, without the blessing of children. From his earliest days the child showed signs of extraordinary piety, love of prayer, and solitude, together with a spirit of mortification, and when he attained a more mature age forsook his father's house and all he had, to lead the life of a hermit in Brittany. After various difficulties and persecutions, he at length established himself in the parish of Berien, where his sanctity and miracles won the admiration of all men. In this spot he gave up his soul to God, and was buried in the church, which now bears his name.")
- Saint Tochumra, a holy virgin venerated in Kilmore in Ireland; she was called on by women in labour.

== Post-Schism Orthodox saints ==
- Venerable Barnabas of Vasa, near Limassol in Cyprus, Wonderworker. (Note: A Cypriot chronographer has written that it is possible that St. Barnabas of Vasa was one of the "'300 Allemagne Saints" who settled in Cyprus in the 12th century. The 300 Allemagne Saints came to Cyprus from Palestine and lived as ascetics in various parts of the island.)
- Venerable Barnabas of Vetluga, ascetic of Vetluga (1445)

=== New martyrs and confessors ===
- New Martyr Zafeirios of Halkidiki (c. 1821)
- 222 Chinese New Martyrs of the Boxer Uprising, at Beijing and other places (1900):

- Hieromartyr Metrophanes, Chi Sung (Chang Tzi-tzung), Priest;
- his wife Presvytera Tatiana;
- his sons John and Isaiah, and Isaiah’s fiancée Maria;
- the church-school teachers Paul Wang and Ia Wen;
- and another 215 martyrs.

- New Hiero-confessor Luke (Voino-Yasenetsky), Archbishop of Simferopol and Crimea, Surgeon, Unmercenary Wonderworker (1961) (Note: In June 2019, the Holy Synod of the Ecumenical Patriarchate formally added the physician Saint Luke, Bishop of Simferopol and Crimea in the Orthodox list of Saints of the Church.) (see also May 29 )

== Other commemorations ==
- Appearance of the Archangel Gabriel to a monk on Mt. Athos, and the revelation of the hymn "It Is Truly Meet" (Axion Estin) (982)
- Icon of the Most Holy Theotokos "It Is Truly Meet" (Axion Estin) (10th century)
- Translation of the relics (1572) of St. Ephraim of Novotorzhk, founder of the Sts. Boris and Gleb Monastery, Novotorzhok (1053)
- Translation of the relics (c. 1592) of Saint Arcadius of Vyazma and Novotorzhk (1077)
- Repose of the recluse Melania of Eletz and Zadonsk (1836)
- Repose of Ivan Vasilievich Kireyevsky, philosopher and Patristic translator (1856)

== Icon gallery ==
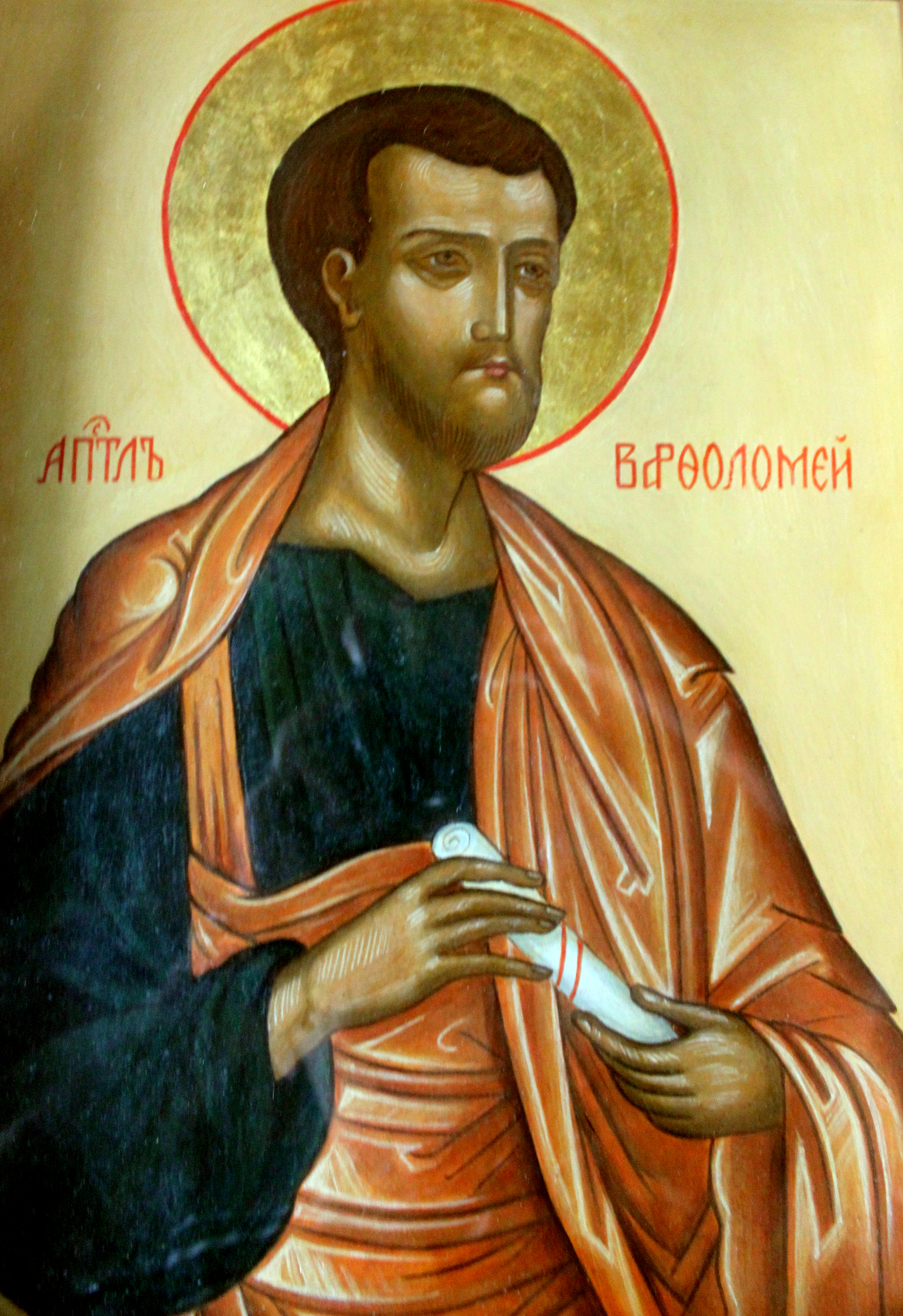
Apostle Bartholomew.

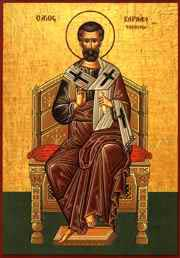
Apostle Barnabas, founder of the Church of Cyprus.

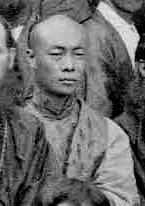
Hieromartyr Metrophanes, Chi Sung (Chang Tzi-tzung).

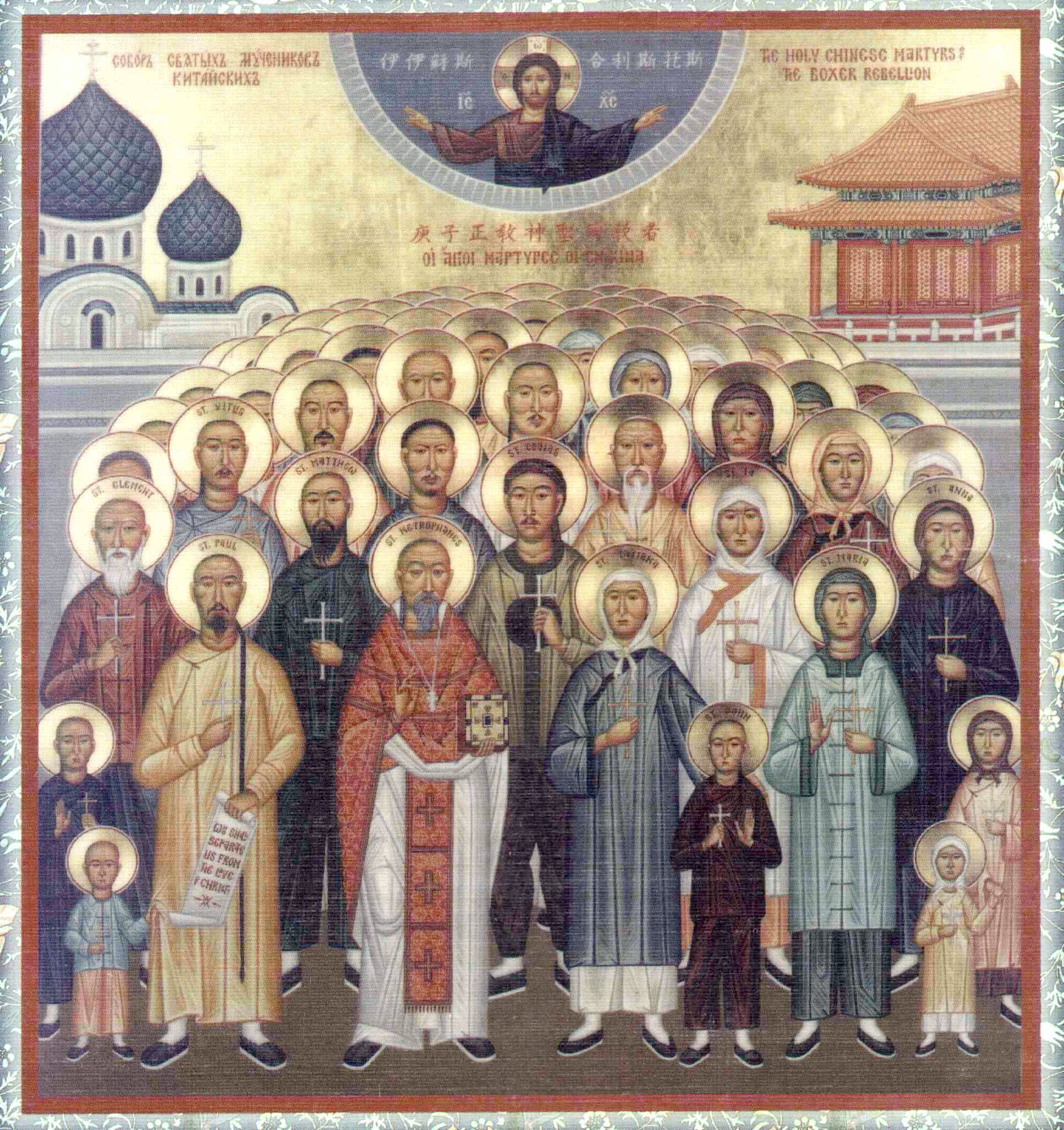
222 Chinese New Martyrs of the Boxer Uprising.

== Sources ==
- June 11/24. Orthodox Calendar (PRAVOSLAVIE.RU).
- June 24 / June 11. HOLY TRINITY RUSSIAN ORTHODOX CHURCH (A parish of the Patriarchate of Moscow).
- June 11. OCA - The Lives of the Saints.
- The Autonomous Orthodox Metropolia of Western Europe and the Americas (ROCOR). St. Hilarion Calendar of Saints for the year of our Lord 2004. St. Hilarion Press (Austin, TX). p. 43.
- The Eleventh Day of the Month of June. Orthodoxy in China.
- June 11. Latin Saints of the Orthodox Patriarchate of Rome.
- The Roman Martyrology. Transl. by the Archbishop of Baltimore. Last Edition, According to the Copy Printed at Rome in 1914. Revised Edition, with the Imprimatur of His Eminence Cardinal Gibbons. Baltimore: John Murphy Company, 1916. p. 170.
- Rev. Richard Stanton. A Menology of England and Wales, or, Brief Memorials of the Ancient British and English Saints Arranged According to the Calendar, Together with the Martyrs of the 16th and 17th Centuries. London: Burns & Oates, 1892. p. 265.

Greek Sources

- Great Synaxaristes: (in Greek) 11 ΙΟΥΝΙΟΥ. ΜΕΓΑΣ ΣΥΝΑΞΑΡΙΣΤΗΣ.
- (in Greek) Συναξαριστής. 11 Ιουνίου. ECCLESIA.GR. (H ΕΚΚΛΗΣΙΑ ΤΗΣ ΕΛΛΑΔΟΣ).
- (in Greek) 11/06/2017. Ορθόδοξος Συναξαριστής.

Russian Sources

- (in Russian) 24 июня (11 июня). Православная Энциклопедия под редакцией Патриарха Московского и всея Руси Кирилла (электронная версия). (Orthodox Encyclopedia - Pravenc.ru).
- (in Russian) 11 июня по старому стилю / 24 июня по новому стилю. Русская Православная Церковь - Православный церковный календарь на 2017 год.
- (in Russian) 11 июня (ст.ст.) 24 июня 2014 (нов. ст.). Русская Православная Церковь Отдел внешних церковных связей. (DECR).
