= May 29 (Eastern Orthodox liturgics) =

Day in the Eastern Orthodox liturgical calendar

Eastern Orthodox liturgical calendar
May 28	May 29	May 30
May 29 O.S. ≍ June 11 N.S. May 29 N.S ≍ May 16 O.S.

An Eastern Orthodox cross

May 29 in Eastern Orthodox liturgical calendars is a feast day and a day of commemoration of saints and martyrs. Although some Orthodox churches use the Revised Julian Calendar and others use the traditional Julian calendar, the fixed commemorations for their respective May 29 are broadly the same, no matter which calendar is used. (Note: Despite the dates being the same, the days to which they refer typically differ by 13 days. The notation Old Style or O.S. is sometimes used to indicate a date in the traditional Julian Calendar (the "Old Calendar"). The notation New Style or N.S. indicates a date in the Revised Julian calendar (the "New Calendar").)

== Saints ==
- Martyr Cyril of Caesarea in Cappadocia (251) (Note: He was born into a pagan family from Cappadocia, but was baptized at a young age in secret from his parents. When his father found this out, he banished him from the family estate. The local magistrate tried to force him to renounce Christ and sacrifice to idols, but the saint remained steadfast in his faith, and was martyred by beheading in 251 AD.)
- Child-martyr Carellus, with martyrs Primolus, Phinodus, Venustus, Gissinus, Alexander, Tredentius, and Jocunda, at Caesarea in Cappadocia (253-259)
- Hieromartyr Olbian, Bishop of Anaea, and his disciples, in Asia Minor (284-303) (Note: "OLBIANUS, a bishop, whose martyrdom by fire in the reign of Maximian for refusing to sacrifice to Juno, is commemorated in the Basilian Menology, May 4 and 29. In one place the see is Anea and the persecutor is the hegemon Julius; in the other Aelianus, hegemon of Asia, persecutes. In the Menologium Græcorum, May 29, the imperial reign is the same, the consuls are Alexander and Maximus, the praesides Julius and Aelianus. A synaxary given by Boll. Acta SS. 29 Mai. vi. 101, twice mentions the same. Under 4 Mai. i. 458, Henschen quotes all the Greek sources, including the Menaea for May 29. He makes Olbianus the Latin Ulpianus, and fixes Anea or Enen on the Carian coast opposite Samos, under the Metropolitan of Ephesus, in the province of Asia. (Cf. Le Quien, Or. Chr. i. 717).")
- Virgin-martyr Theodosia of Tyre (308) (Note: The Holy Martyress Theodosia of Tyre suffered in the year 308. On 29 May is celebrated the transfer of her relics to Constantinople, and later on to Venice.)
- Martyrs Andrew (Andras) and his spouse.
- Saint Alexander of Alexandria, Patriarch of Alexandria (326)
- Venerable Jeremiah of Damascus. (Note: He is listed among the saints of the Church of Antioch.)
- Venerable Virgin-martyr Theodosia of Constantinople (730)

== Pre-Schism Western saints ==
- Martyr Restitutus, at Rome, on the Via Aurelia (299).
- Saint Maximinus of Trier, Bishop of Trier in Germany (352)
- Martyrs Sisinius, Martyrius, and Alexander, near Trent, in the time of Emperor Honorius (397)
- Saint Maximus of Verona, Bishop of Verona in Italy (6th century)
- Venerable Votus, Felix and John, hermits in the Pyrenees (750) (Note: "Votus and Felix were brothers from Saragossa in Spain who found a hermitage in the Pyrenees which was already inhabited by John (John de Atares). The three lived together and reposed at about the same time. The hermitage was situated beneath a huge rock (Peña) where the monastery of St John de la Peña later grew up.")
- Saint John de Atares (750) (Note: "A hermit in the Pyrenees in Spain. He lived beneath a huge rock, where the monastery of St John de Ia Peña (of the Rock) was later built. This is famous in Spanish history, since the monastery became the cradle of the Kingdoms of Navarre and Aragon.")
- Saint Ethelbert the King (Æthelberht II of East Anglia) (794) (see also May 20)
- Saint Gerald, a monk at Brou, became Bishop of Mâcon, returned to his monastery 40 years later and reposed there (927)
- Saint Ulric of Einsiedeln (978)
- Saint Eleutherius of Rocca d'Arce, Confessor, at Arcano in Lazio.

== Post-Schism Orthodox saints ==
- Righteous John and Mary of Ustiug (Vologda) (13th century)
- Venerable Helena Dragaš (Ypomone in monasticism; Ipomoni of Loutraki) (1450)
- Blessed Constantine XI Palaiologos, last Roman emperor, martyred by the Ottoman Turks (1453)
- New Martyr Andrew of Argentes, in Chios (1465)
- Blessed John of Ustiug, Fool-for-Christ (1494)

=== New martyrs and confessors ===
- New Martyr John (or Nannus) of Smyrna (1802) (Note: The Holy Martyr John (Nannos) of Soluneia (Thessalonika) was martyred by the Turks in the year 1802 in the city of Smyrna.)
- New Hieromartyr Euthymios (Agritellis) of Zela, in Pontus, Bishop (1921) (Note: The new-martyr Saint Euthymios, known in the world as Agritellis, was born in 1872 in Parakoila on Lesvos, where he started his education. At the age of nine, he entered Leimonos monastery as a child and was tonsured a monk eight years later, in 1899. He completed his general education at the monastery, and was then sent by the brotherhood to the Theological School of Halki, where he studied from 1900 to 1907. After his graduation, he returned to the monastery, having been ordained as a deacon. He then became a teacher, and was head of the Leimonos School. In 1908 he was ordained priest, and from 1911 until his death in May 1921, served the people of the diocese of Zela on the Pontus as their Bishop. It was because of his actions in support of the Greek side in the War in Asia Minor that he was captured by the Turkish armed forces on January 21, 1921. After suffering terrible tortures he gave up his soul to the Lord on May 29th, 1921.)
- New Hiero-confessor Luke (Voino-Yasenetsky), Archbishop of Simferopol and Crimea and Surgeon, Unmercenary Wonderworker (1961) (see also June 11)
- Hieromartyr John Preobrazhensky, Deacon (1938)
- Martyr Andrew Trofimov (1938)

== Other commemorations ==
- Appearance of the Precious and LifeGiving Cross near Rostov (1423)
- Uncovering of the relics (2000) of St. Job (Joshua in schema), Schemamonk of Anzersk Island, at Solovki (1720) (Note: See: (in Russian) Иов Анзерский. Википедии. (Russian Wikipedia).)
- Synaxis of the Saints of Krasnoyarsk (2015)
- Repose of Schemamonk Michael of Valaam (1854)
- Repose of Nun Dorothea of Sukhotin Monastery (1885) (Note: See: (in Russian) Сухотинский Знаменский женский монастырь. Википедии. (Russian Wikipedia).)

=== Icons ===
- Icon of the Most Holy Theotokos "Surety of Sinners" in Moscow (1848) (Note: See: (in Russian) Споручница грешных. Википедии. (Russian Wikipedia).) (see also March 7)
- Icon of the Mother of God "Non-Slumbering Eye" (“Unsleeping Eye”).
- Icon of the Mother of God "Imperial" (“Tsesarskaya-Borovskaya”).

== Icon gallery ==
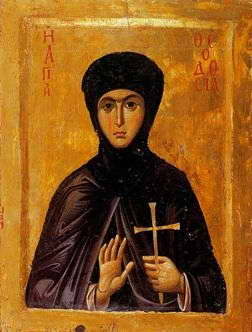
Virgin-martyr Theodosia of Tyre.

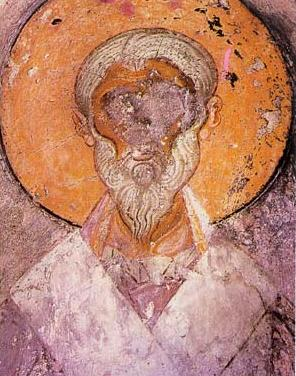
Icon of Pope Alexander of Alexandria.

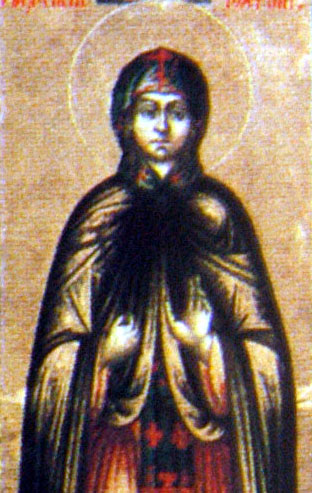
St. Theodosia of Constantinople.

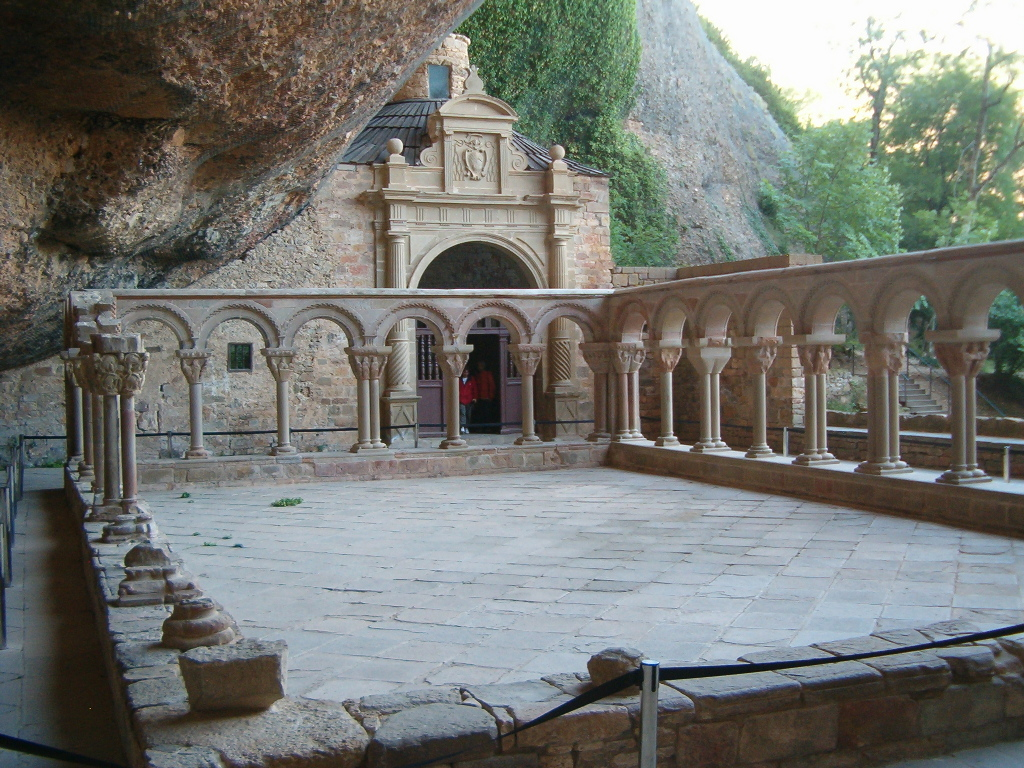
The monastery of St. John de Atares (San Juan de la Peña (of the rock)) is located at the south-west of Jaca, in Huesca, Spain. It was one of the most important monasteries in Aragon in the Middle Ages.

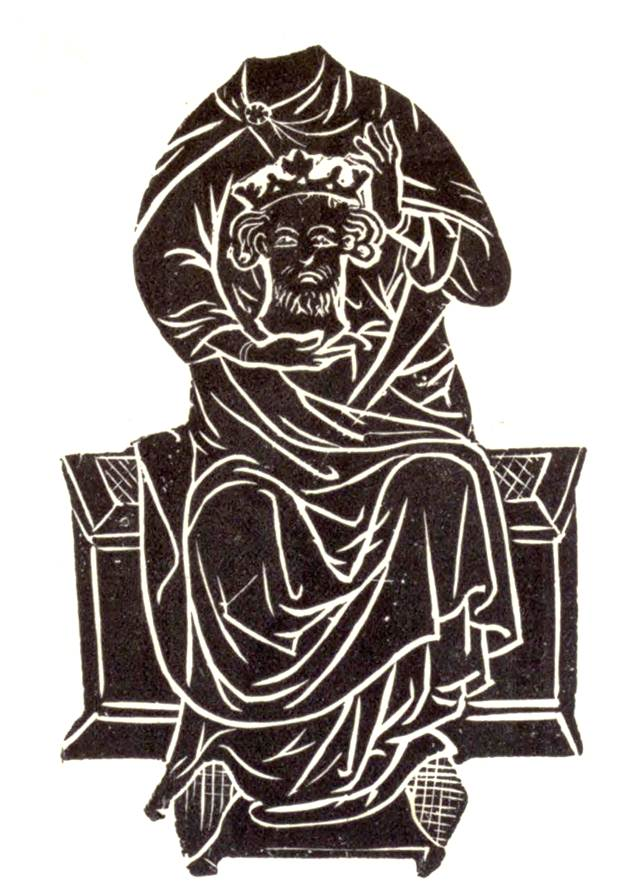
St. Æthelberht II of East Anglia.

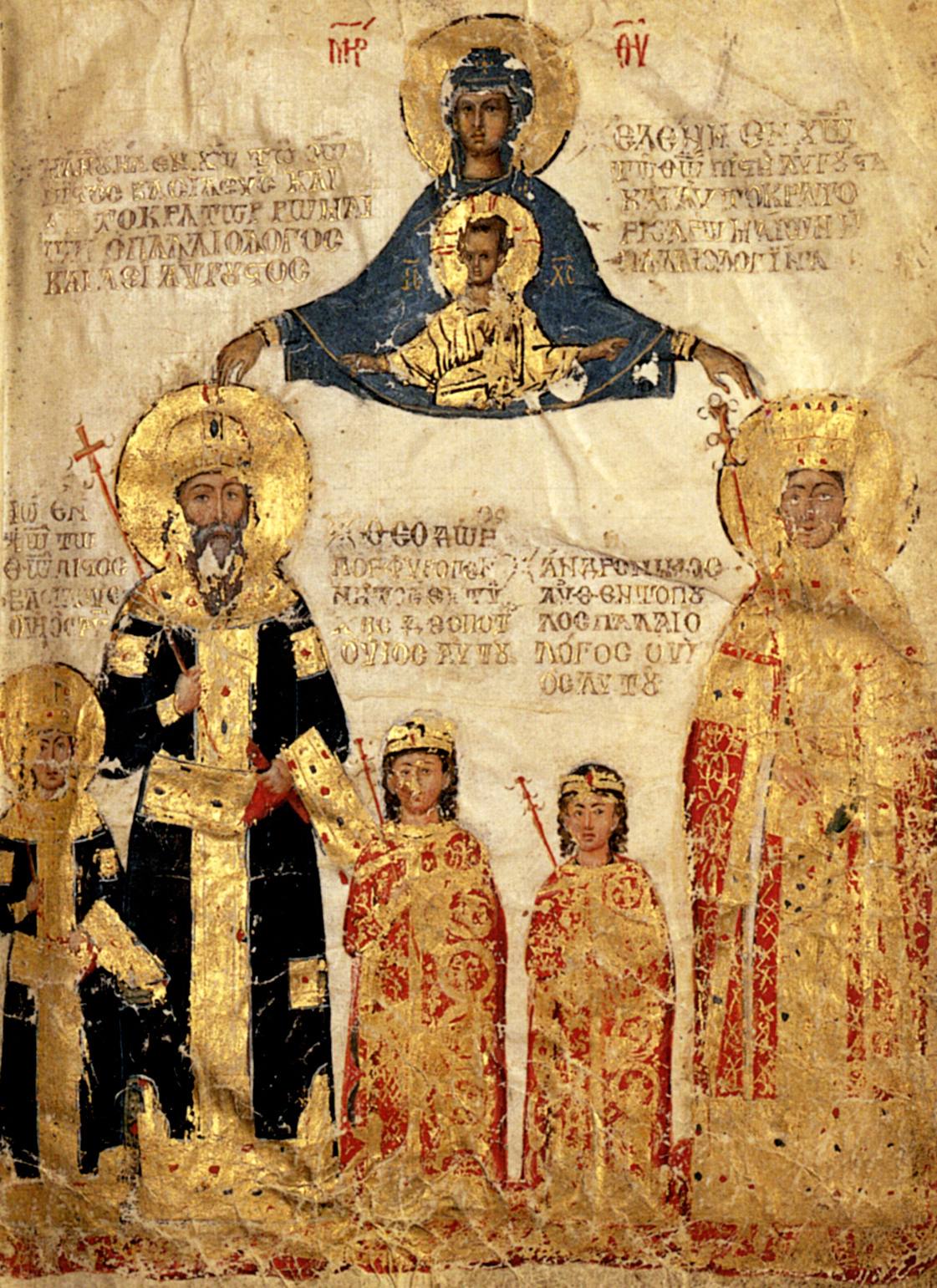
Empress Helena Dragaš (St. Ipomoni of Loutraki) with Emperor Manuel II Palaiologos, and three of their sons, John, Andronikos and Theodore.

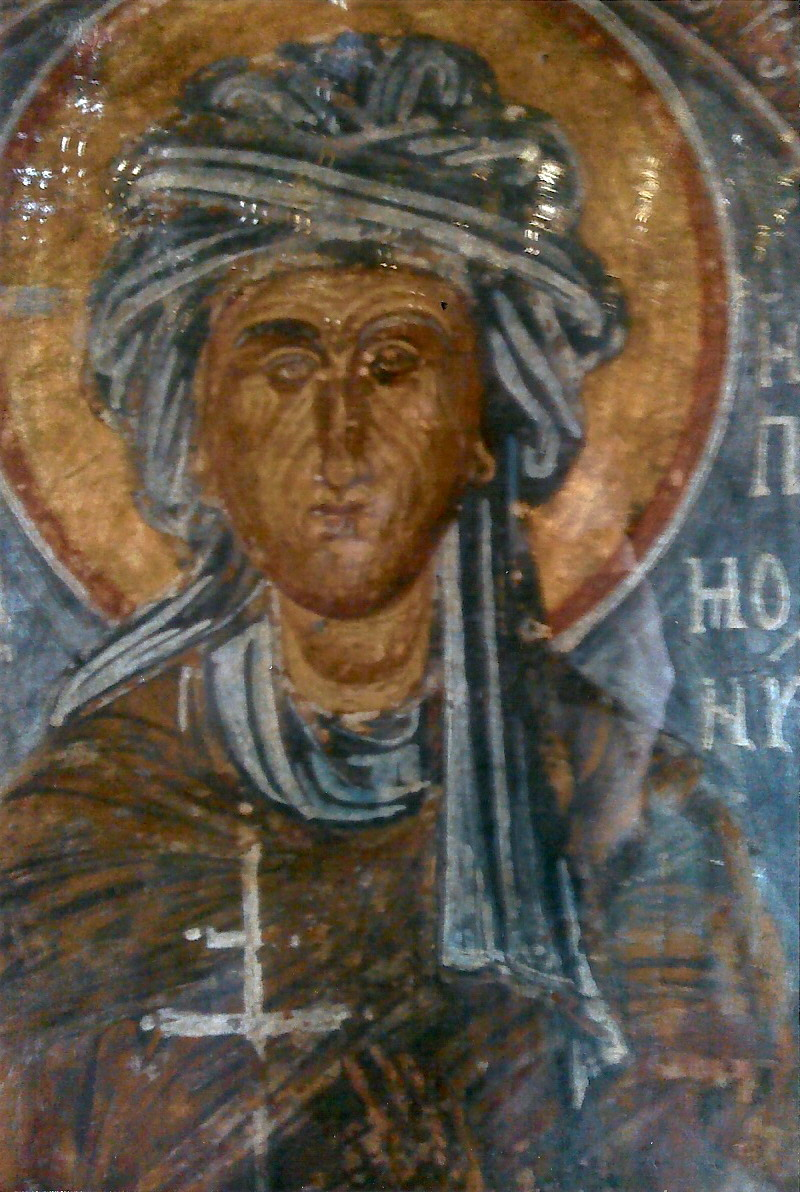
Icon of Helena Dragaš (St. Ipomoni of Loutraki), in the cave of Saint Patapios in Loutraki - Greece.

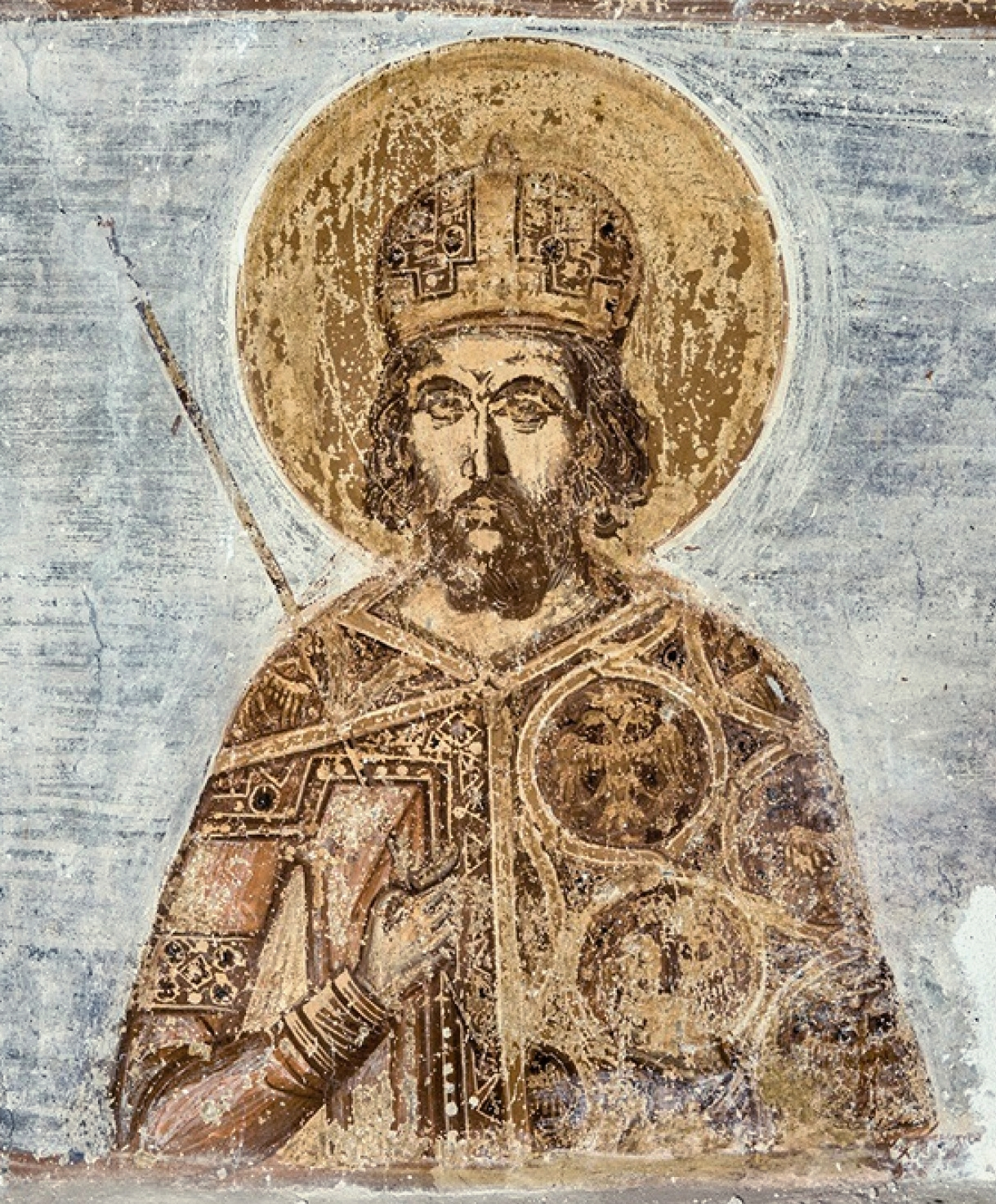
Fresco of Constantine XI from the Catholicon of the Old Monastery of Taxiarches in Aigialeia (mid-15th c.).

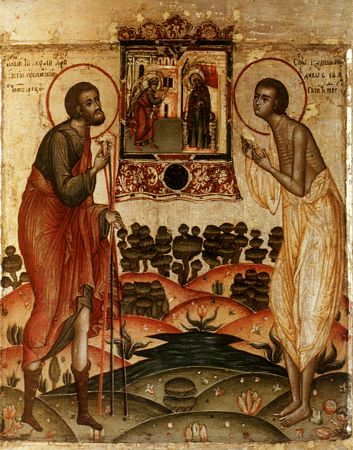
Supplication of St. Procopius and St. John of Ustiug at the Icon of the Annunciation.

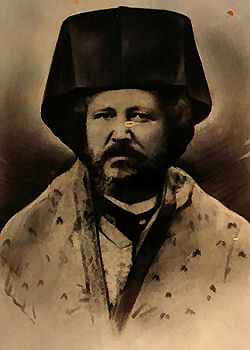
New Hieromartyr Euthymios (Agritellis) of Zela.

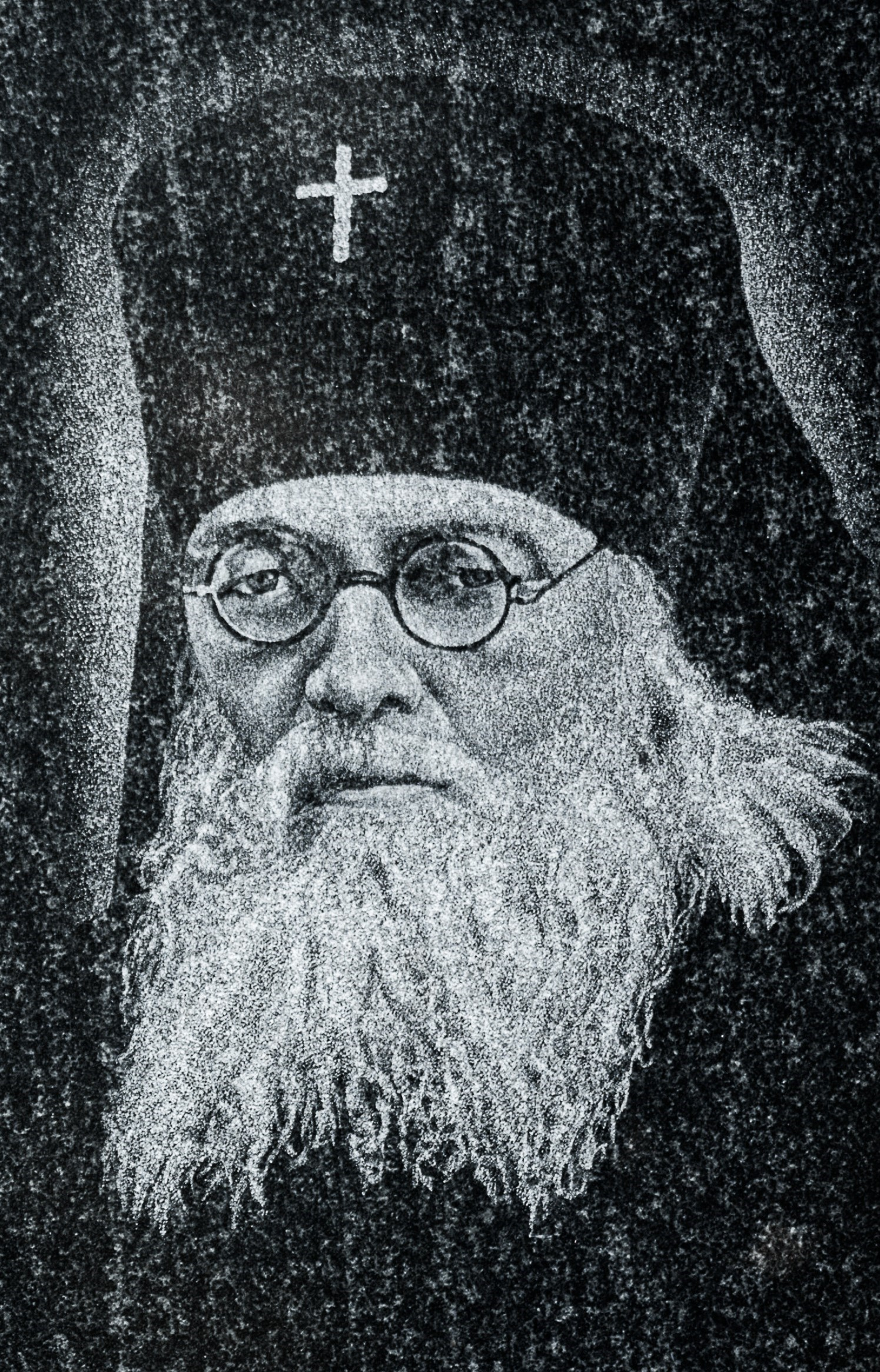
Voyno-Yasenetsky's likeness from a commemorative plaque in Pereslavl-Zalessky, Russia.

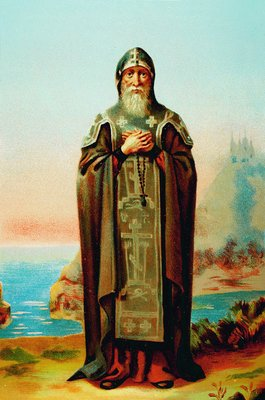
St. Job (Joshua in schema), Schemamonk of Anzersk Island, at Solovki.

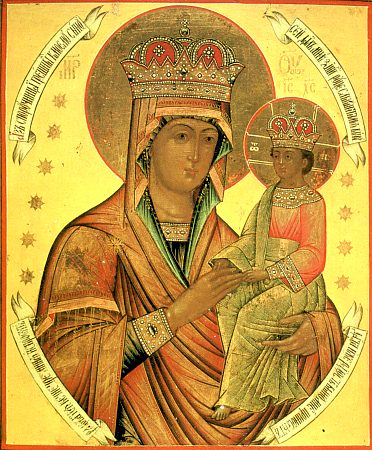
Icon of the Mother of God "Surety of Sinners".

== Links ==
- May 29/June 11. Orthodox Calendar (ORTHOCHRISTIAN.COM).
- June 11 / May 29. HOLY TRINITY RUSSIAN ORTHODOX CHURCH (A parish of the Patriarchate of Moscow).
- May 29. OCA - The Lives of the Saints.
- May 29. Latin Saints of the Orthodox Patriarchate of Rome.
- May 29. The Roman Martyrology.

Greek Sources

- Great Synaxaristes: (in Greek) 29 ΜΑΪΟΥ. ΜΕΓΑΣ ΣΥΝΑΞΑΡΙΣΤΗΣ.
- (in Greek) Συναξαριστής. 29 Μαΐου. ECCLESIA.GR. (H ΕΚΚΛΗΣΙΑ ΤΗΣ ΕΛΛΑΔΟΣ).

Russian Sources

- (in Russian) 11 июня (29 мая). Православная Энциклопедия под редакцией Патриарха Московского и всея Руси Кирилла (электронная версия). (Orthodox Encyclopedia - Pravenc.ru).
