= Lale Island =

Aegean island in Balıkesir Province, Turkey

Native name: Lale Adası
- Location within Turkey

Geography
- Location: Aegean Sea
- Coordinates: 39°20′43″N 26°41′31″E

Administration
- Turkey
- İl (province): Balıkesir Province
- İlçe: Ayvalık

Lale Island (literally "Tulip Island", also called Dolap Island) is an Aegean Island of Turkey. In the antiquity it was called Kremydonisi (Greek: Κρεμμυδονήσι and Κρομμυδονήσι). It is part of Ayvalık ilçe (district) of Balıkesir Province at 39°20′43″N 26°41′31″E. It has two road connections; one to mainland Anatolia (towards south east) and the other to Cunda Island (towards west). The connection to mainland was constructed in 1817 (i.e., Ottoman era) by filing. Now a new bridge is under construction instead of filing. (see Gönül Bridge) The connection to Cunda Island is by a bridge constructed in 1954.

The island is an inhabited island mostly with summer houses. It is connected with Cunda Island by the Ayvalık Strait Bridge.
