= Tochumra =

Saint Tochumra
- Born: Ireland
- Residence: Kilfenora
- Feast: 11 June
- Patronage: Women in labour

Saint Tochumra (or Tocomracht) was a holy virgin, or possibly two virgins, in medieval Ireland. Her (or their) feast day is 11 June.

== Monks of Ramsgate account ==
The monks of St Augustine's Abbey, Ramsgate wrote in their Book of Saints (1921),

Tochumra (St.) V. (June 11)
(Date unknown) The Patron Saint of Tochumrach in the Diocese of Kilfenora. Another Saint, also of the same name, is venerated in the Diocese of Kilmore; but particulars concerning either of them are lacking.

== Butler's account ==
The hagiographer Alban Butler (1710–1773) wrote in his Lives of the Fathers, Martyrs, and Other Principal Saints under June 11,

St. Tochumra, Virgin in Ireland

Was titular saint of the parish of Tochumracht, in the diocess of Fenabore, otherwise called Killfenora; the cathedral of which bears the name of St. Fachnan, who seems to have been the first bishop of this see, which is situated in Munster; but since the year 1660 is annexed to the archbishopric of Tuam.

Another St. Tochumra, V.

In the diocess of Kilmore, was also much honoured in Ireland on this day, and invoked by women in Labour. Colgan could discover no Acts, &c.

== O'Hanlon's account ==
John O'Hanlon (1821–1905) wrote of Tochumra or Tocomracht in his Lives of the Irish Saints under June 11.

ARTICLE VII.-TOCOMRACHT, VIRGIN. The Martyrlogies of Tallagh, and of Donegal, mention that Tocamracht, Virgin, of Conmaicne, had veneration paid her, at the 11th of June. The latter Calendar only gives the territory, with which she had been connected; but, as this territorial designation is applied in composition with different localities, it is not so easy to determine where the present saint lived. At this date, also, in the Rev. Alban Butler's work, and in the Circle of the Seasons, St. Tochumra, Virgin, is found entered.

ARTICLE VIII.—St. TOCHUMRA. VIRGIN. There is apparently another St. Tochumra, Virgin, whose feast occurs at 11th of June, in Butler's Lives of the Saints, where we are told, she belonged to the diocese of Kilmore, and that she was much honoured in Ireland, being invoked by women in labour. Colgan could discover no Acts of her. Likewise, in the Circle of the Seasons, we have the name of this St. Tochumra entered. It is likely, she is not a different person from the preceding Tocomracht.

== Sources ==
- Butler, Alban (1799), The Lives of the Primitive Fathers, Martyrs, and Other Principal Saints: Compiled from Original Monuments and Other Authentic Records, vol. 6, J. Moir This article incorporates text from this source, which is in the public domain.
- O'Hanlon, John (1875), Lives of the Irish Saints : with special festivals, and the commemorations of holy persons, Dublin: J. Duffy This article incorporates text from this source, which is in the public domain.
- St. Augustine's Abbey, Ramsgate (1921), The Book of saints : a dictionary of servants of God canonized by the Catholic Church, London: A. & C. Black, ltd. This article incorporates text from this source, which is in the public domain.
