= Ayvalık Strait Bridge =

Ayvalık Strait Bridge Ayvalık Boğaz Köprüsü
- Coordinates: 39.344145°N 26.684611°E
- Carries: 15 Eylül Avenue
- Crosses: Dolap Strait
- Locale: Ayvalık, Balıkesir Province
- Owner: Ayvalık Municipality

Characteristics
- Total length: 80 m (260 ft)
- Width: 9 m (30 ft)

History
- Opened: 1964

The Ayvalık Strait Bridge (Turkish: Ayvalık Boğaz Köprüsü), also known as 15 Eylül Bridge, is a bridge crossing the Dolap Strait in Ayvalık, Balıkesir Province, western Turkey. It connects Cunda Island with Lale Island and, by extension, the town of Ayvalık on the mainland. It has been dubbed The first strait bridge in Turkey (Boğaz Köprüsü) since it predates the Bosphorus Bridge in Istanbul (1970), which has a famous nickname as Strait Bridge.

The bridge carries 15 Eylül Avenue, with one lane in each direction; and is Cunda Island's only connection to the mainland.
