= Euthymios Tornikios =

Byzantine ecclesiastical official and writer

Euthymios Tornikios or Tornikes (Greek: Εὐθύμιος Τορνίκιος/Τορνίκης; fl. 1181–1222) was a Byzantine ecclesiastical official and writer.

Euthymios was a member of the Tornikios family of princely Armenian or Georgian origin that entered Byzantine service in the mid-10th century. He was the son of Demetrios Tornikios (the logothetes tou dromou and sebastos of Isaac II Angelos) and a unknown member of the Malakes family. His older brother was logothetes tou dromou and sebastos Constantine Tornikios, also a general and eparch of Constantinople, and they were likely the brothers of Irene (Herina or Eirene), the first wife of Isaac II.

He is first mentioned as a deacon in 1181, and died in the Despotate of Epirus sometime after 1222. He is best known for his rhetorical speeches, of which those preserved date chiefly to the period 1200–1205, such as his panegyric on the failure of the coup of John Komnenos the Fat, or monodies on the death of his father and of his close friend and relative, the metropolitan bishop of Neopatras Euthymios Malakes. According to Alexander Kazhdan, his "rhetorical works are very conventional", with only the monody on the death of his father displaying a personal tone, "describing both family characteristics and, tenderly, Demetrios's death".

== Sources ==
- Kazhdan, Alexander, ed. (1991). The Oxford Dictionary of Byzantium. Oxford and New York: Oxford University Press. ISBN 0-19-504652-8.
