= Tornikios family =

Byzantine noble family

Tornikios Τορνίκιος
- Noble family
- Country: Byzantine Empire
- Founded: 10th century
- Founder: Abu Ghanim
- Titles: doux; logothetes tou dromou; patrikios; protospatharios; sebastokrator; strategos and more

The Tornikios family or Tornikes (pl. Tornikioi; Greek: Τορνίκιος, Τορνίκης; feminine form Tornikina, Greek: Τορνικίνα) was a Byzantine noble family, prominent during the middle and late Byzantine period. From the mid-10th century, members of the family, of Armenian and Georgian origins, acquired a role of growing importance in the political affairs of the empire, while in the following centuries they played a leading role in crucial military and political events. In the 13th century the family grew in importance after intermarrying with members of other aristocratic families, mainly the Palaiologos dynasty.

== History ==
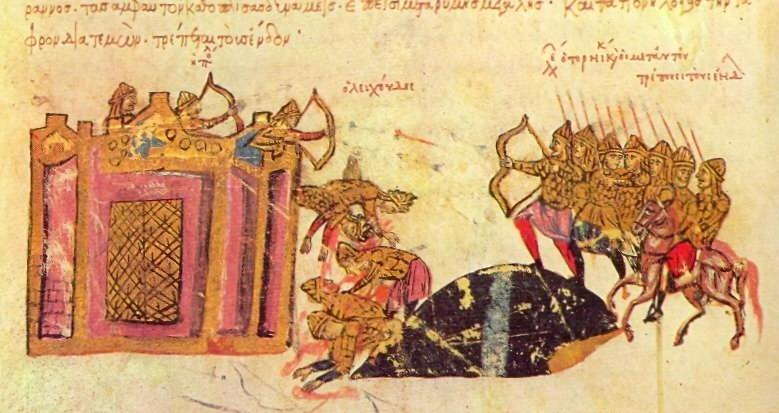
Leo Tornikios attacks Constantinople, from the Chronicle of John Skylitzes (1047)

=== Middle Byzantine period ===
In the early 10th century, the Armenian prince Abu Ghanim or Apoganem, brother of the prince Grigor I of Taron, was accepted in Constantinople and was awarded the title of protospatharios and later the title of patrikios (patrician). Abu Ghanim's son, T‘ornik, also received the rank of patrician. After the death of T'ornik, his wife and son, Nikolaos Tornikios, were invited by emperor Romanos I Lekapenos to settle in Constantinople, where they assumed their place among the Byzantine aristocracy. T'ornik's nickname, from the Armenian word t'orn "grandson", was rendered in Greek as Tornikios or Tornikes.

Nikolaos and Leon Tornikios, probably brothers, were among the supporters of Constantine VII when he deposed his co-rulers, Stephen and Constantine Lekapenos, and became sole emperor in 945. Another prominent Tornikios of the 10th century was John Tornikes, a general of the Georgian prince David III of Tao, whose relationship with the other family members is unclear. John settled in the Byzantine Empire as a monk in the Monastery of Iviron in Mount Athos and later became a diplomat and general under Basil II. In 979 he successfully suppressed the revolt of Bardas Skleros. John's relatives would also occupy important positions under the Byzantine emperor.

During the 11th century, strategos Leo Tornikios from Adrianople revolted against his relative, the Byzantine emperor Constantine IX Monomachos, claiming the imperial throne. His revolt broke out in his birthplace, the theme of Macedonia, and almost captured Constantinople. Still, it eventually failed with Leo getting captured and blinded on Christmas 1047. In the first half of the 12th century, the family temporarily disappears from the sources and reappears towards the end of the century. The most known member at the time was George Tornikios, who had a career as didaskalos (teacher) of psalms and gospels in Constantinople. George was also an active clergyman and writer, whose letters provided plenty of information about the life in Ephesus at his time.

=== Late Byzantine period ===
From the 12th century onwards, the Tornikioi became civil functionaries and were again actively involved in political developments. Demetrios Tornikios and later his son, Constantine, both occupied the position of logothetes tou dromou. Demetrios' second son, Euthymios, was a deacon and a writer whose preserved works are dated 1200–1205. After the 1204 sack of Constantinople by the Fourth Crusade, the family moved to the Empire of Nicaea, where they acquired important positions. Constantine's son, Demetrios, was a mesazon in the Nicaean court during the years of Theodore I Laskaris and his son, Constantine, was awarded the title of sebastokrator in 1259. John Tornikios, who is mentioned in 1258 as the doux (governor) of Thrakesion, is likely Constantine's brother. After Constantinople was recaptured in 1261, the Tornikioi returned to the capital where Constantine is mentioned in 1264 as the Eparch of the City.

The Tornikioi intermarried with many noble families, including the Palaiologos, and grew in importance since the 14th century. Among the most important members of this union were Constantine Tornikios Palaiologos, who was reported in 1326 as megas droungarios tes viglas and his alleged son, Demetrios Tornikios Palaiologos, who was a megas droungarios and kephale in Constantinople between 1337 and 1339. Other prominent members were Andronikos Tornikios Palaiologos, a parakoimomenos, and Michael Tornikios Palaiologos, who was megas konostaulos and served as a counselor of Andronikos II Palaiologos during his conflict with his grandson Andronikos III.

== See also ==
- Byzantine bureaucracy and aristocracy

== Sources ==
- Stouraitis, Ioannis (2005). "Tornikios family". Encyclopaedia of the Hellenic World, Asia Minor.
- Kazhdan, Alexander, ed. (1991). The Oxford Dictionary of Byzantium. Oxford and New York: Oxford University Press. ISBN 0-19-504652-8.
- Wortley, John, ed. (2010). John Skylitzes: A Synopsis of Byzantine History, 811–1057. Cambridge: Cambridge University Press. ISBN 978-0-521-76705-7.
