= Euthymios Malakes =

Euthymios Malakes (Greek: Εὐθύμιος Μαλάκης, ca. 1115 – before 1204) was a Byzantine bishop and writer, closely connected to the intellectual court circles of Constantinople.

He was born ca. 1115 at Thebes in Greece. Sometime before 1166, he was appointed as the metropolitan bishop of Neopatras. He was related to the Tornikios family, and became closely connected to the intellectual circles of the Patriarchal School of Constantinople, as well as to such prominent scholar-bishops of the late Komnenian period as the Archbishop Eustathius of Thessalonica and Michael Choniates. His main works were rhetorical speeches, chiefly in honour of Emperor Manuel I Komnenos and his general, Alexios Kontostephanos, as well as monodies for his friends, including Eustathius.

He may also be the original author of a further three speeches published by Euthymios Tornikes, who was Malakes' closest friend and who wrote a monody in his honour.

== Sources ==
- Kazhdan, Alexander (1991). "Malakes, Euthymios". In Kazhdan, Alexander (ed.). The Oxford Dictionary of Byzantium. Oxford and New York: Oxford University Press. p. 1275. ISBN 0-19-504652-8.
