= Cunda Island =

Aegean island in Balıkesir Province, Turkey

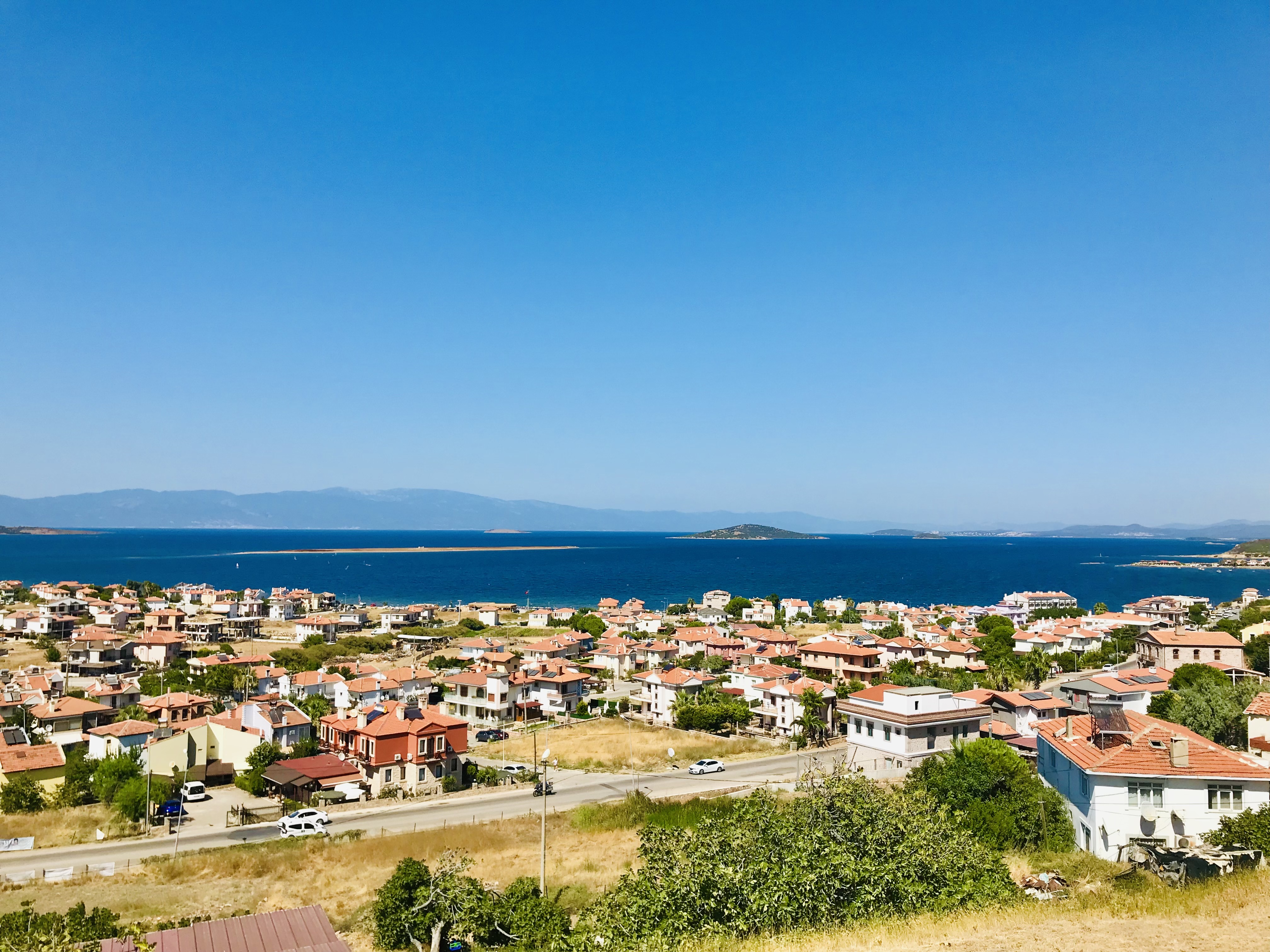
- A view from Cunda Island (Alibey Island)

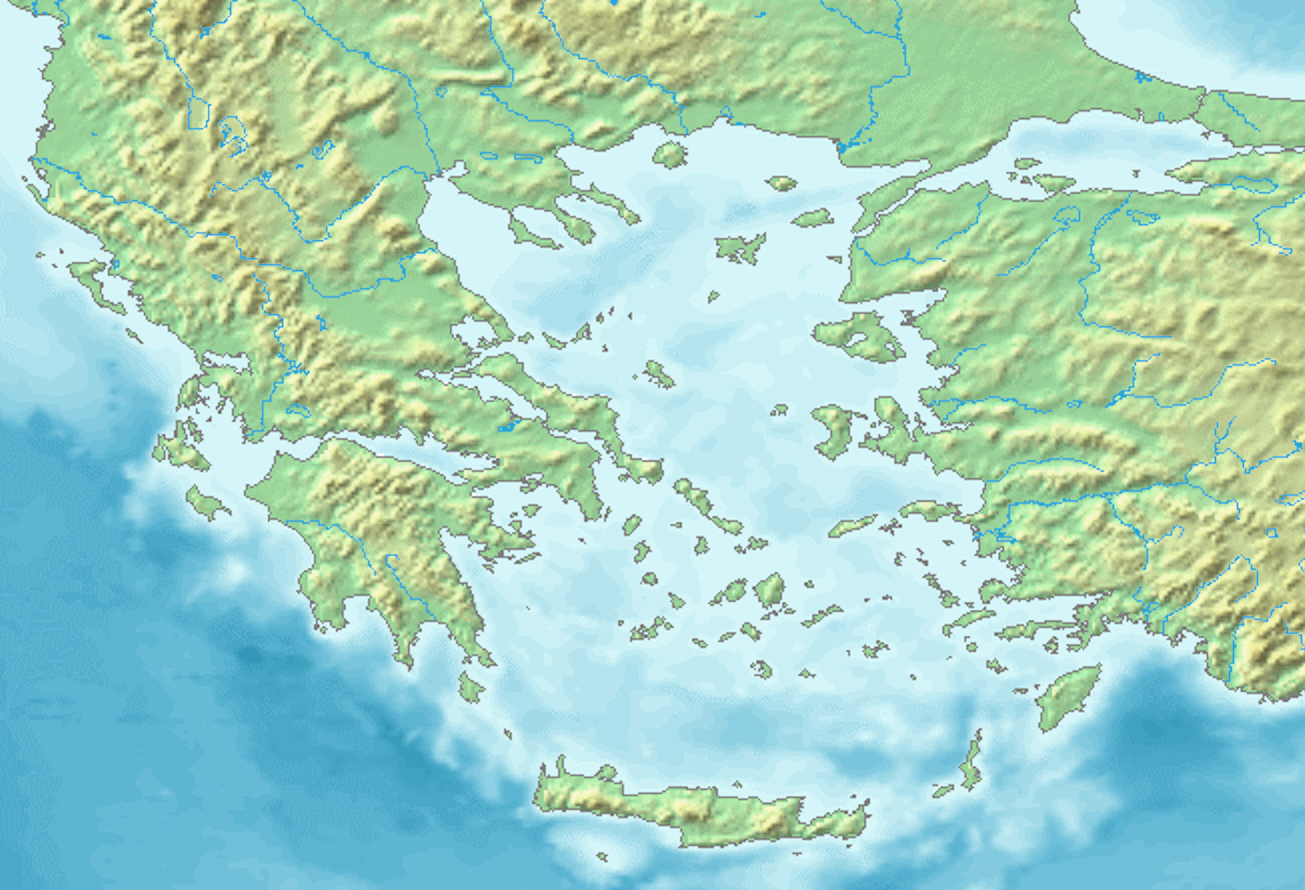
- Location within Aegean Sea Location within Turkey

Geography
- Coordinates: 39°20′35″N 26°38′10″E
- Area: 26.8 km^{2} (10.3 sq mi)

Administration
- Turkey
- Province: Balıkesir

Demographics
- Population: 3,321

Additional information
- Time zone: TRT (UTC+3)

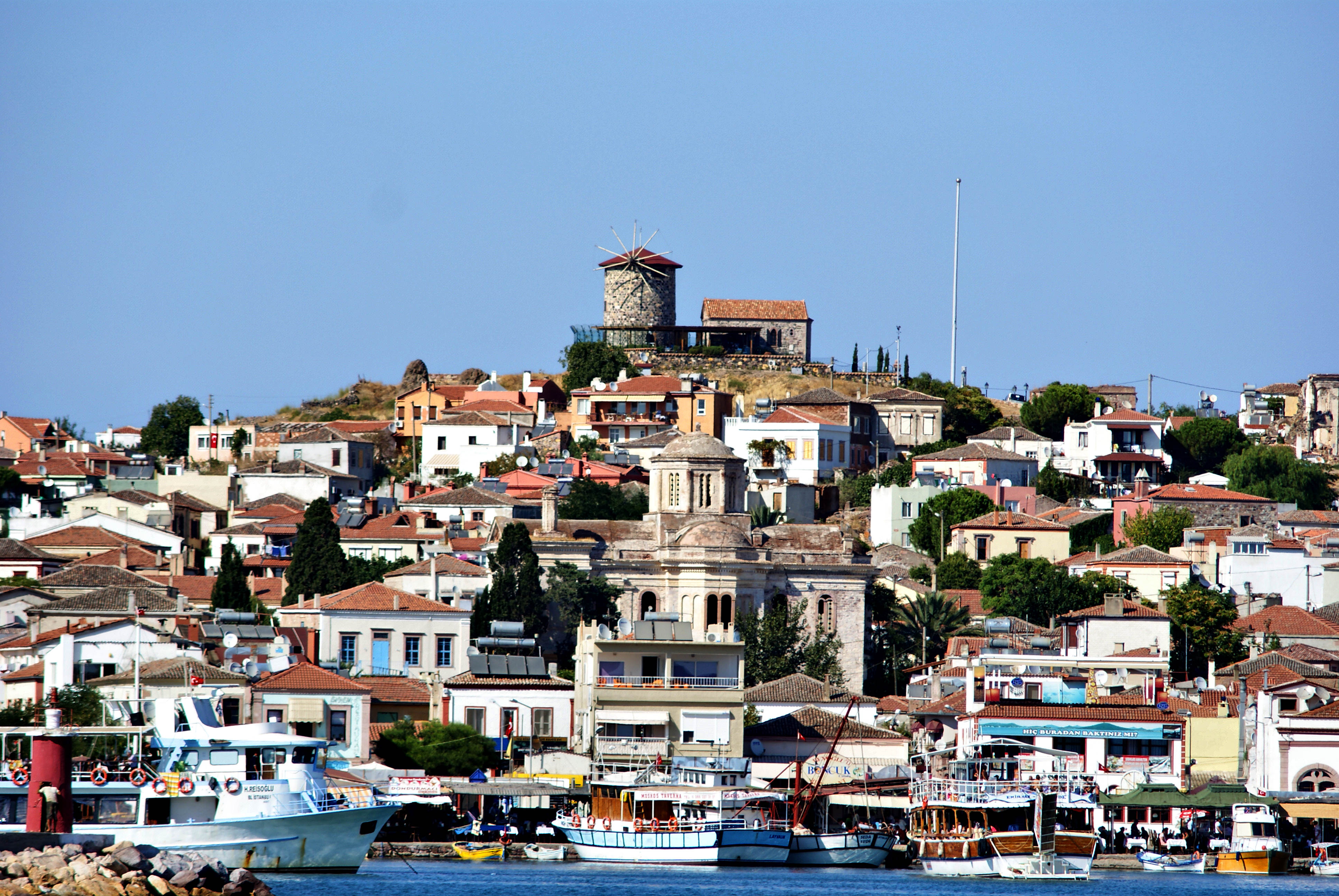
Cunda Island viewed from the sea

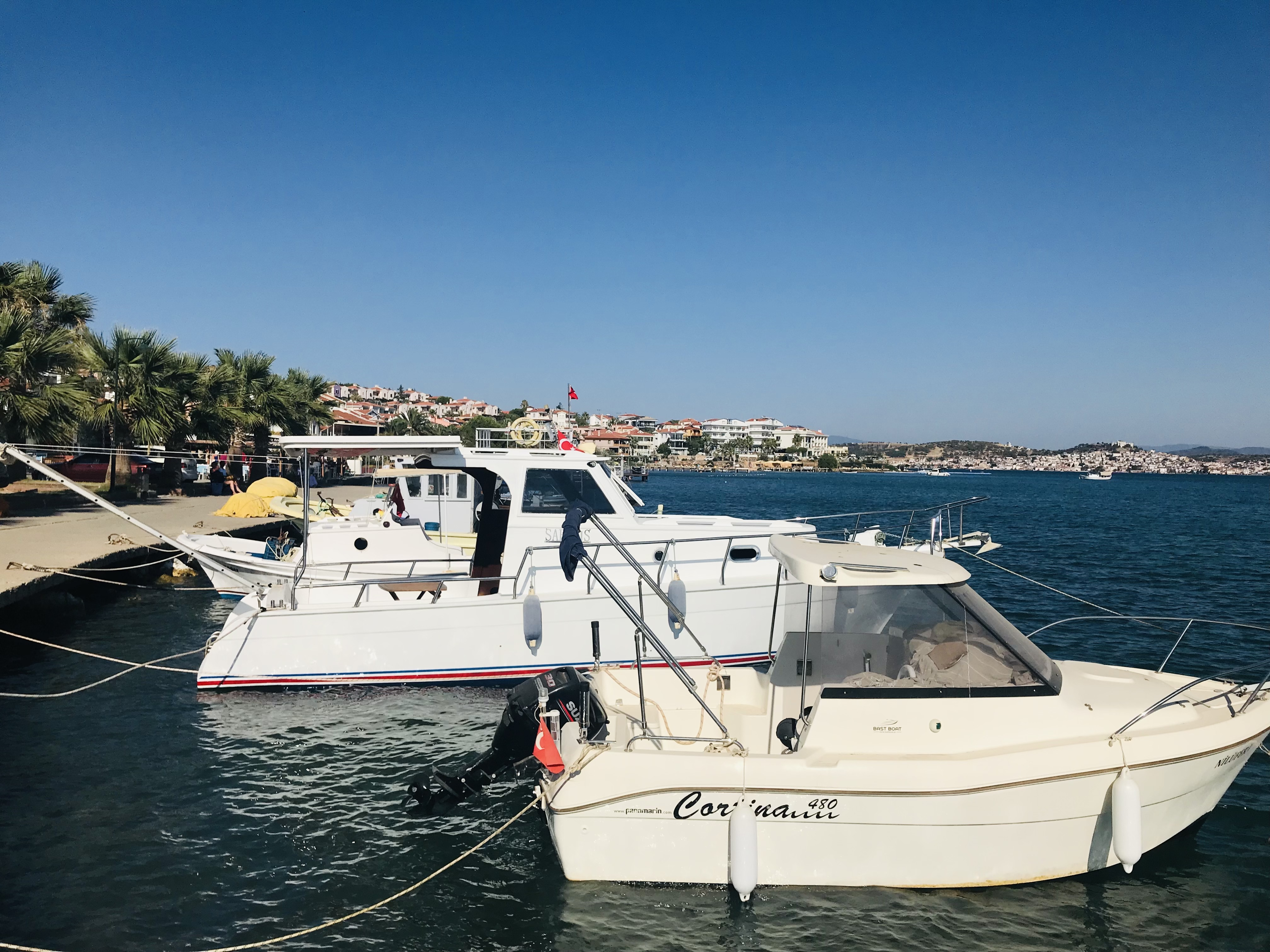
Cunda Island, Ayvalık, Balıkesir Province, Turkey

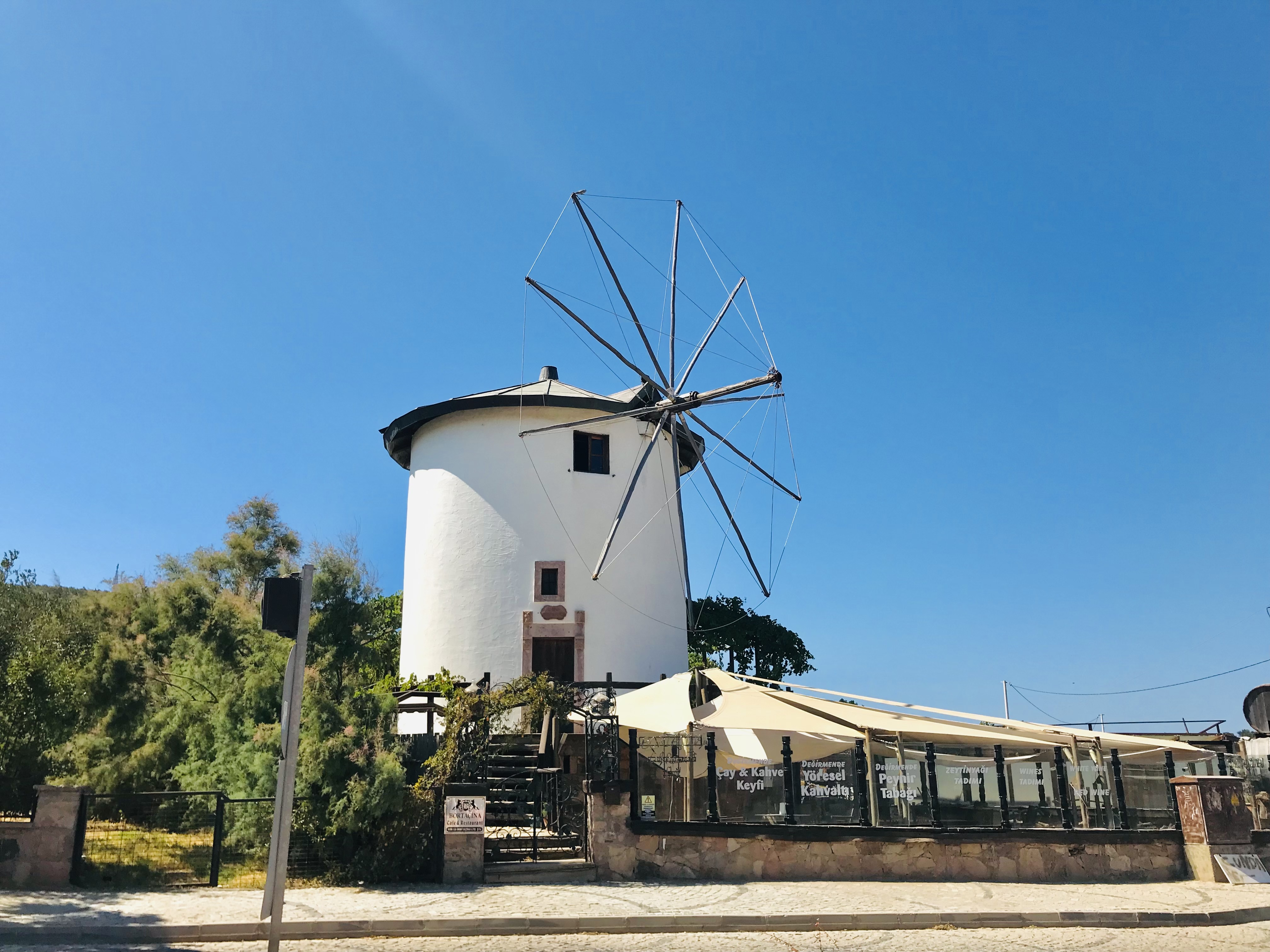
White washed windmills on Cunda Island

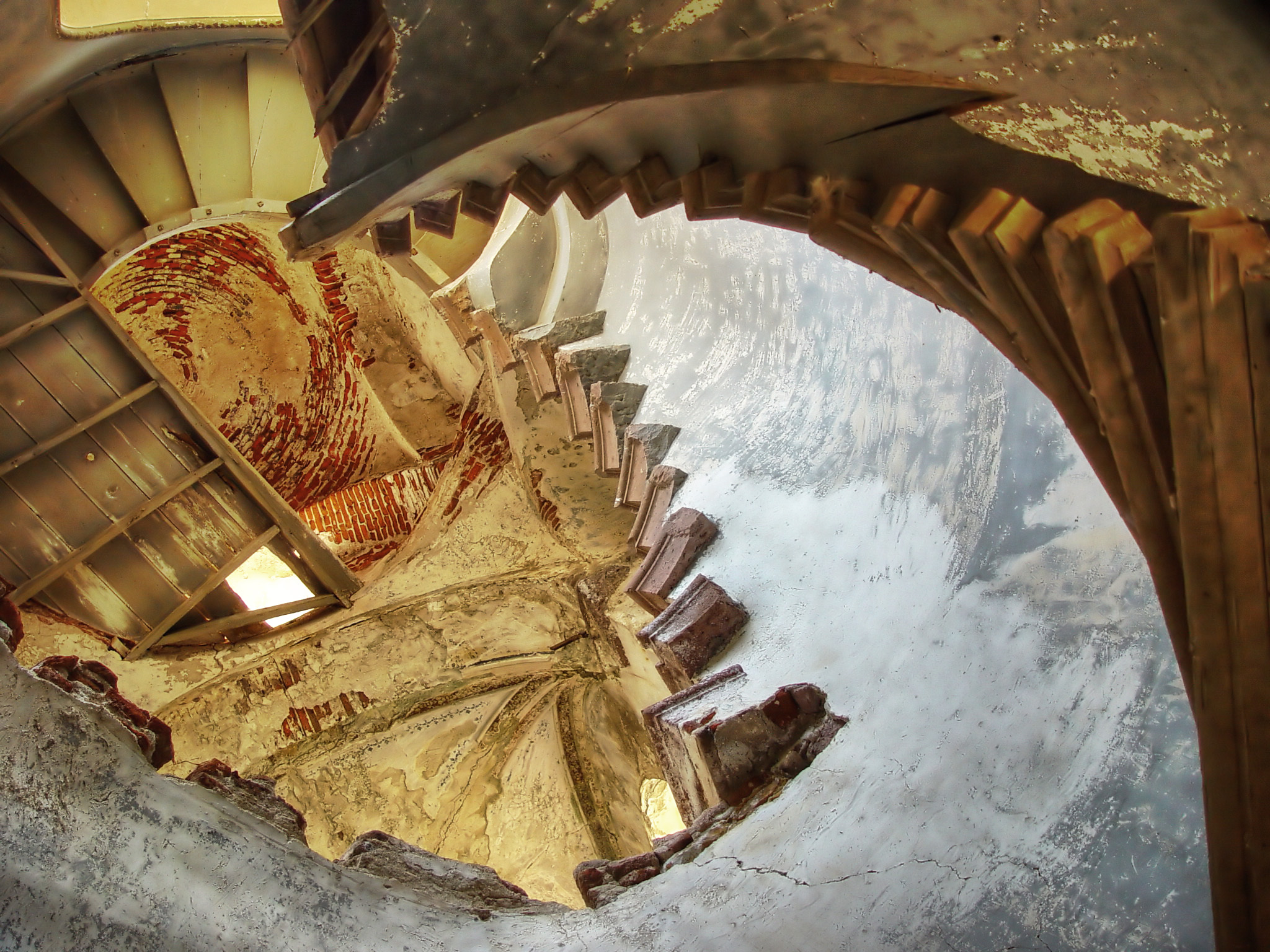
Interior of large former Greek Orthodox cathedral of the Taxiarchs

Cunda Island, also called Alibey Island (Turkish: Cunda Adası, Alibey Adası), Greek Moschonisi (Greek: Μοσχονήσι or Μοσχόνησος), is the largest of the Ayvalık Islands archipelago in Turkey, which was historically called the Hekatonisa (Εκατόνησα) or Moschonisia (Μοσχονήσια) archipelago in Greek. It lies in the Edremit Gulf on Turkey's northwestern coast, off the coast of Ayvalık in Balıkesir Province, Turkey, with an area of 26.8 square kilometres (10 sq mi). It is located 16 kilometres (10 miles) east of Lesbos, Greece.

== History ==
=== Antiquity ===
According to written sources, there have been human settlements on the island since antiquity; the sources mention the settlements of Nasos (Greek: Νάσος), Pordoselini or Pordoselene (Greek: Πορδοσελήνη) and Chalkis (Greek: Χαλκίς).

=== 20th Century ===
According to the Ottoman General Census of 1881/82-1893, the kaza of Cunda (Yunda) had a total population of 4,671 consisting of 4,417 Greeks, 89 Muslims and 165 foreign citizens.

Until the Treaty of Lausanne (1923) the entire population of the island was Greek. In 1913, Mehmed Reshid visited the island and he suggested the settlement of wealthy Muslim muhacirs on the island in order to control the Greek population. In 1914, persecution against the population started, resulting in the departure of many inhabitants from the island. The bishop Photios, various priests and prominent men were seized, beaten and imprisoned in a mill, to be released only after some days had passed. Men and women were beaten and tortured. Later, the inhabitants were deported to Ayvalık (Kydonies/Aivali in Greek) on the mainland without being allowed to take anything with them. In Ayvalık they shared the same fate of oppression with its Christian inhabitants until they were all deported, and scattered among the Turkish villages of the vilayets of Izmir and Bursa. There they were subjected daily to all kinds of persecution and died in great numbers. The churches on the island were looted and turned into warehouses and stables, the lamps and holy images in them were broken, paintings of art destroyed and houses rendered uninhabitable. In 1915, inhabitants of the island were compelled to pay 2,500 Turkish pounds for the uniforms of the Turkish army and 2,000 Turkish pounds for the construction of barracks; to pay a wheat-tax for the upkeep of the navy, and to buy, at no cheap price, post-cards. Also, some inhabitants were killed and tortured.

For a short period (1921–1922), the island was the see of a Greek Orthodox metropolitan bishop, while the neoclassical mansion of the last metropolitan, Ambrosios, who was executed by the Turkish army, still survives on the seafront of the island's town center. On September 19, 1922 several hundred of the Greek islanders were killed on Cunda; only some children were spared and sent to orphanages. The next year, following the Treaty of Lausanne and the population exchange between Greece and Turkey, the few remaining islanders were forced to leave for Greece and were replaced by Cretan Turks and Turks from Lesbos.

== Present day ==
Cunda Island has the character of a typical Aegean resort town. There are frequent bus and ferry services to Cunda Island from the town center of Ayvalık. Cunda Island is connected to Lale Island, and thence to the mainland, by the Ayvalık Strait Bridge, and a causeway built in the late 1960s. This is the first and currently the oldest surviving bridge in Turkey that connects lands separated by a strait.

The main landmark of Cunda Island remains the Taxiarchis Church (Turkish: Taksiyarhis Kilisesi). The large, former Greek Orthodox cathedral was abandoned and dilapidated, but has now been restored and houses one of the Rahmi M. Koç Museums. Poroselene (Greek: Ποροσελήνη) bay in the north of the island is among Cunda's main sights. In antiquity, it was the home of a dolphin which saved a drowning boy, according to a story mentioned by Pausanias.

In 2007, after two years of work, all 551 buildings in Cunda Island were inspected and registered by the Turkish Science Academy and Yıldız Technical University Faculty of Architecture, as part of the "Culture of Turkey inventory project".

USA-based Harvard University and Turkey's Koç University have established a joint project in Cunda Island and run a "Harvard-Koç University Intensive Ottoman & Turkish Summer School" every summer.

In 2020, the Greek monastery of Saint Demetrius, also known as Ai Dimitri Monastery, which was built in 1766 with donations from the citizens of Cunda, was completely destroyed by treasure hunters.

== Gallery ==
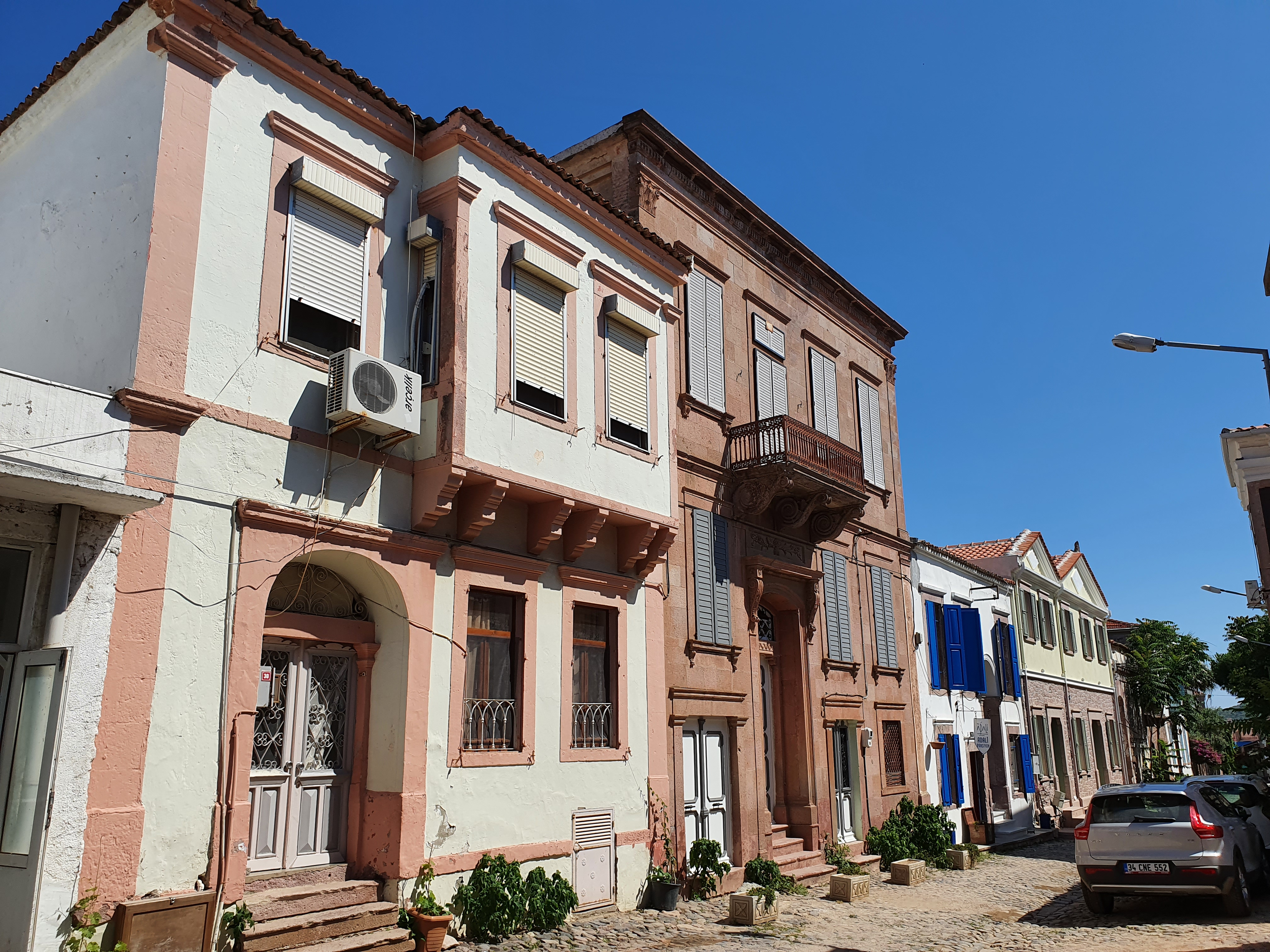
Houses in Cunda Island

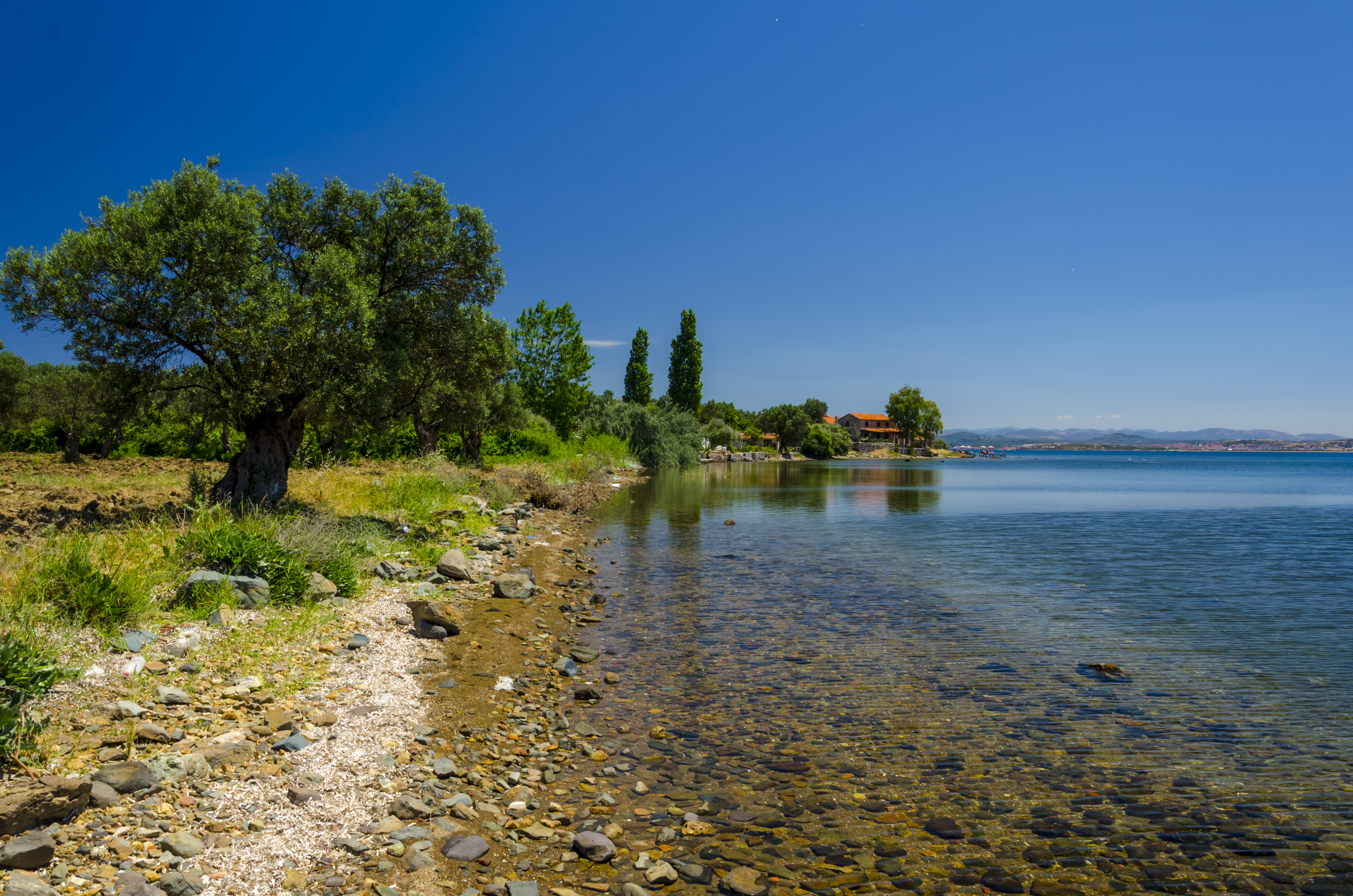
Paterica Cove

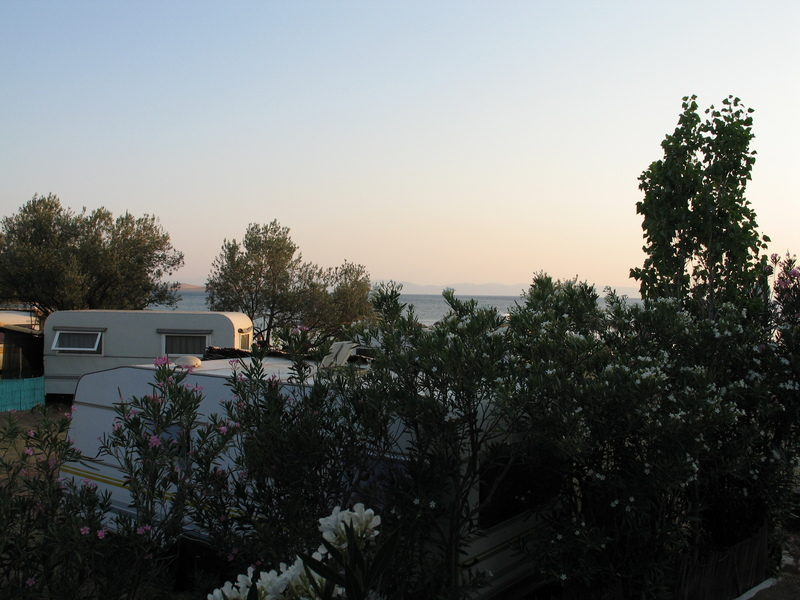
Camping area in Cunda

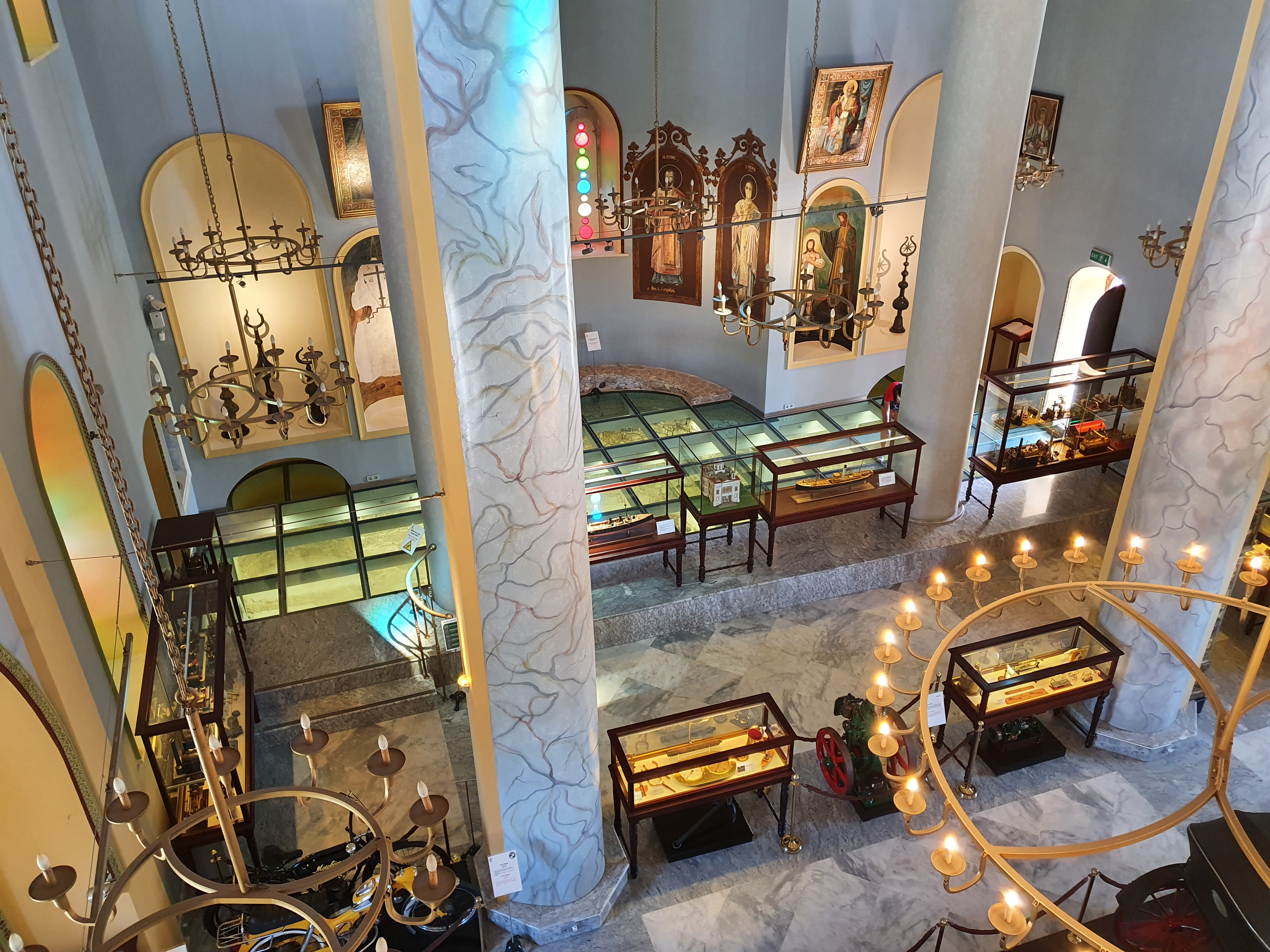
Taksiyarhis Church

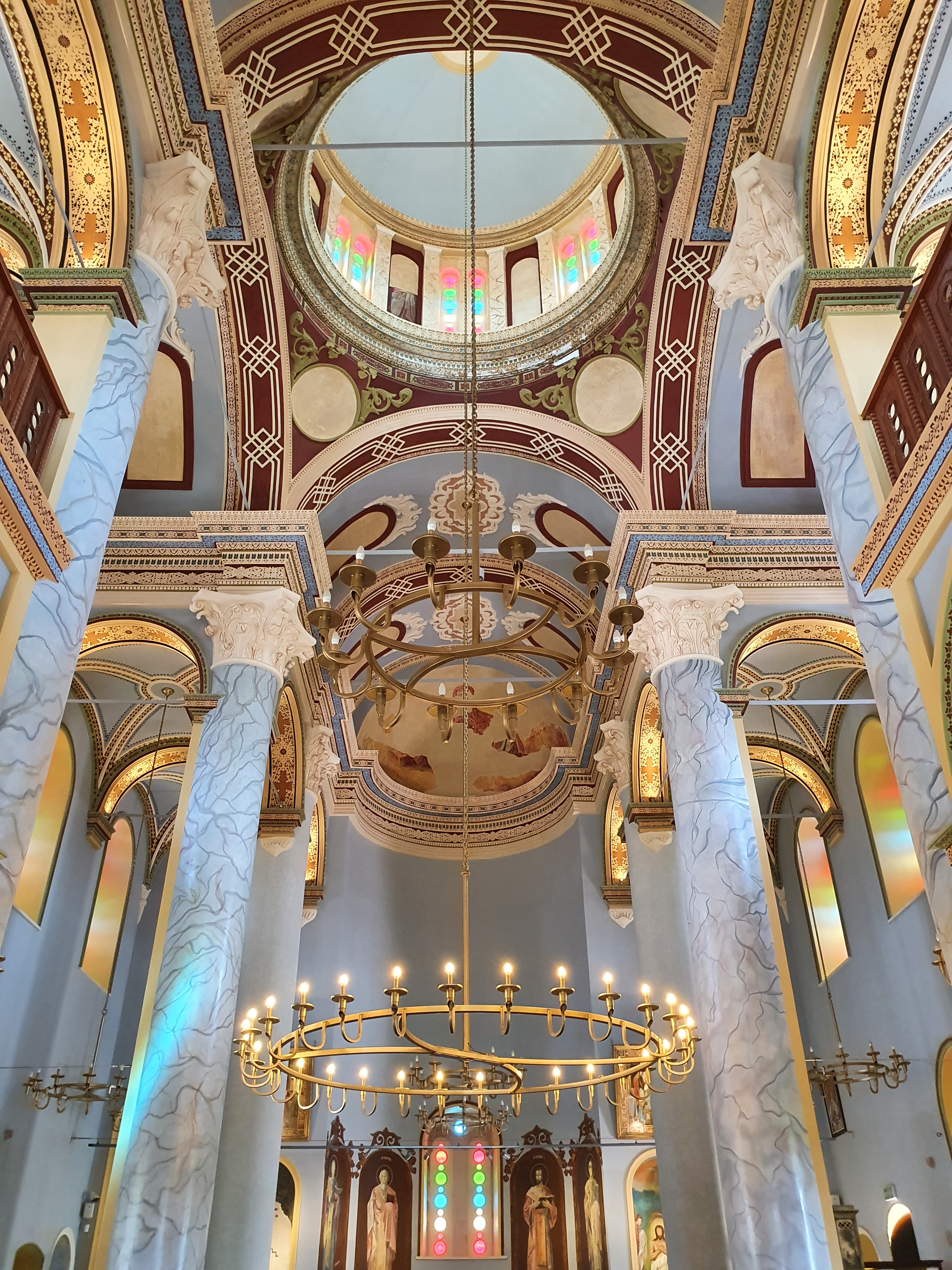
Taksiyarhis Church

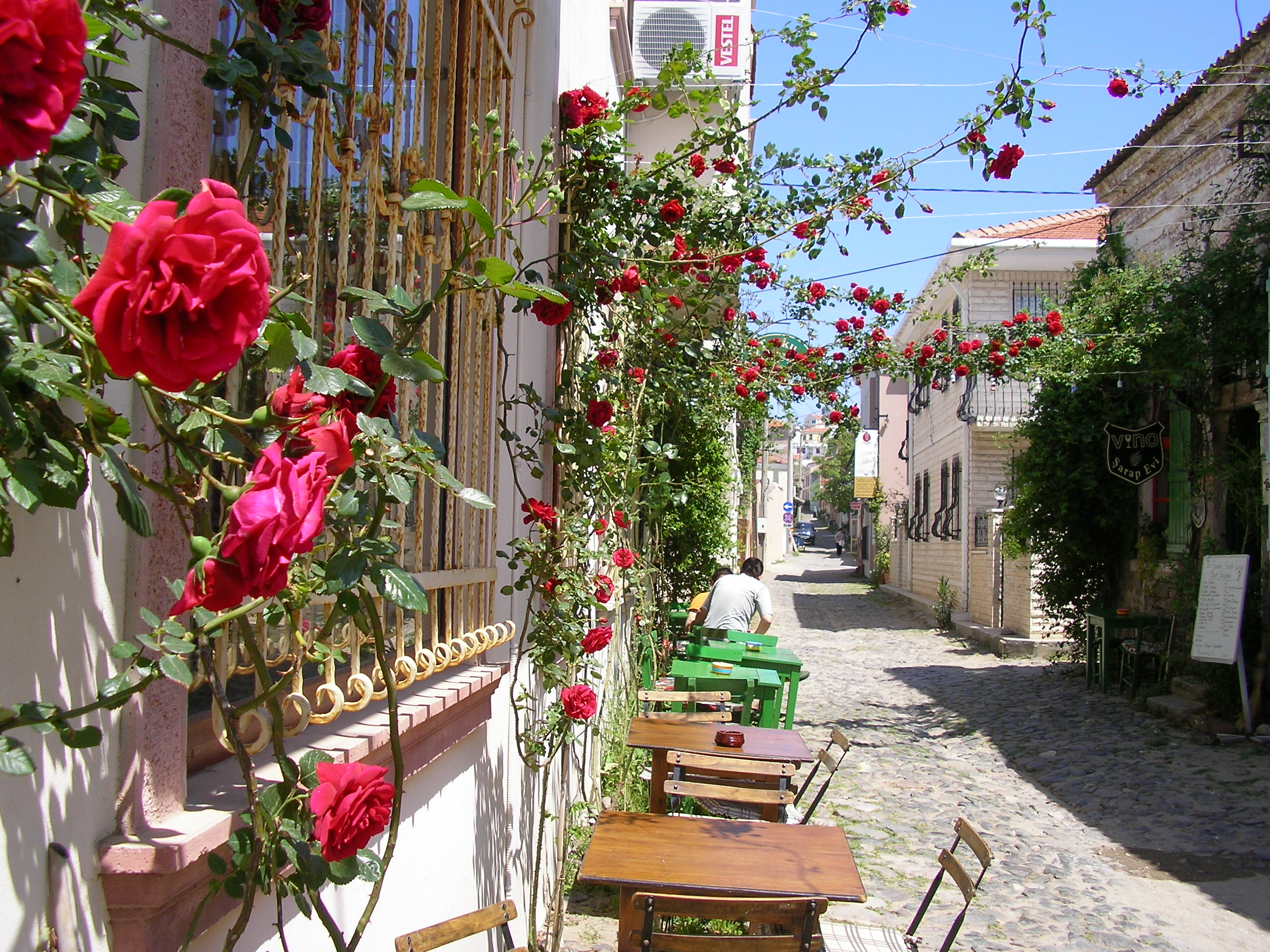
A street from Cunda Island

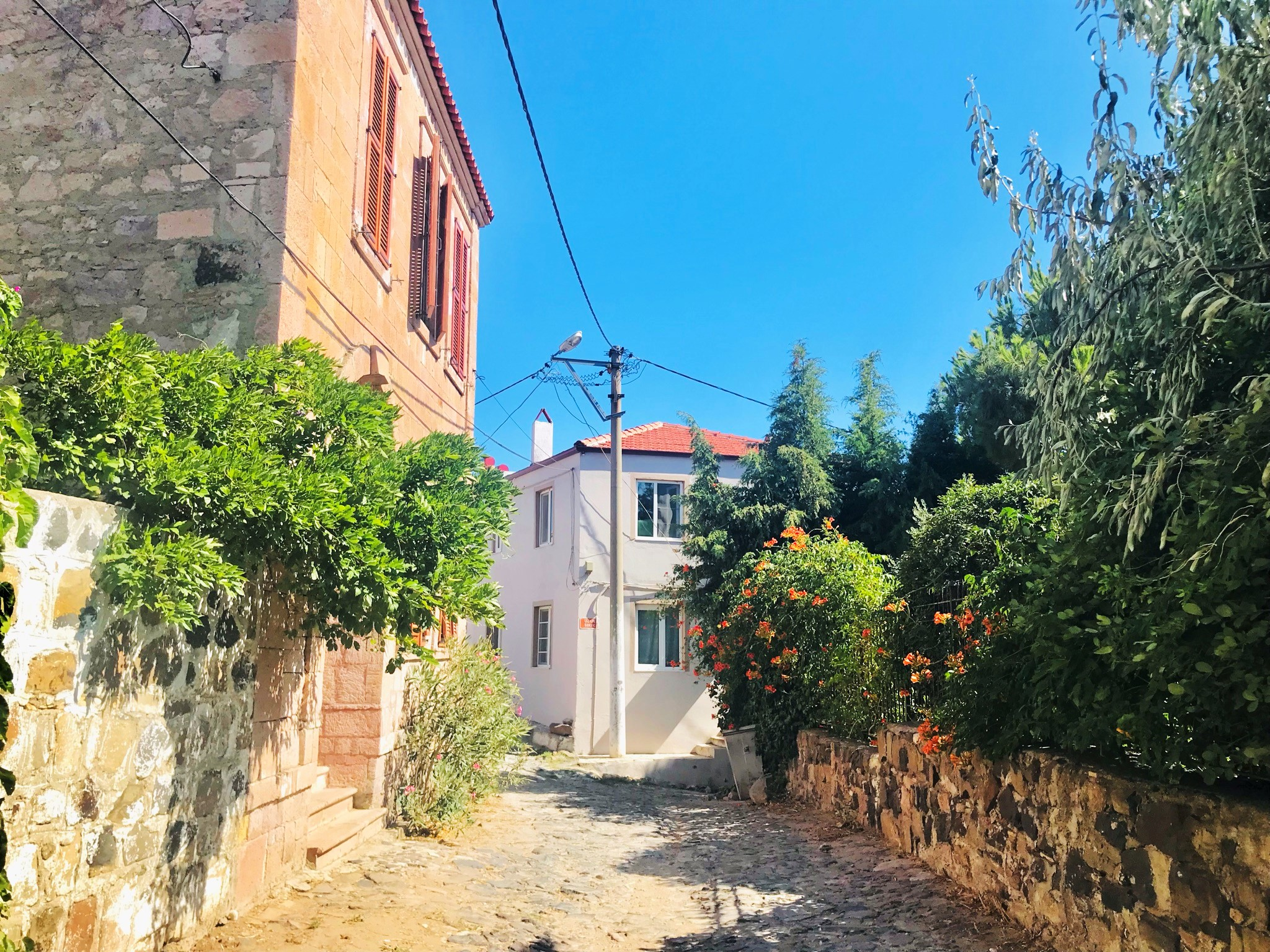
Paved walkways of Cunda Island

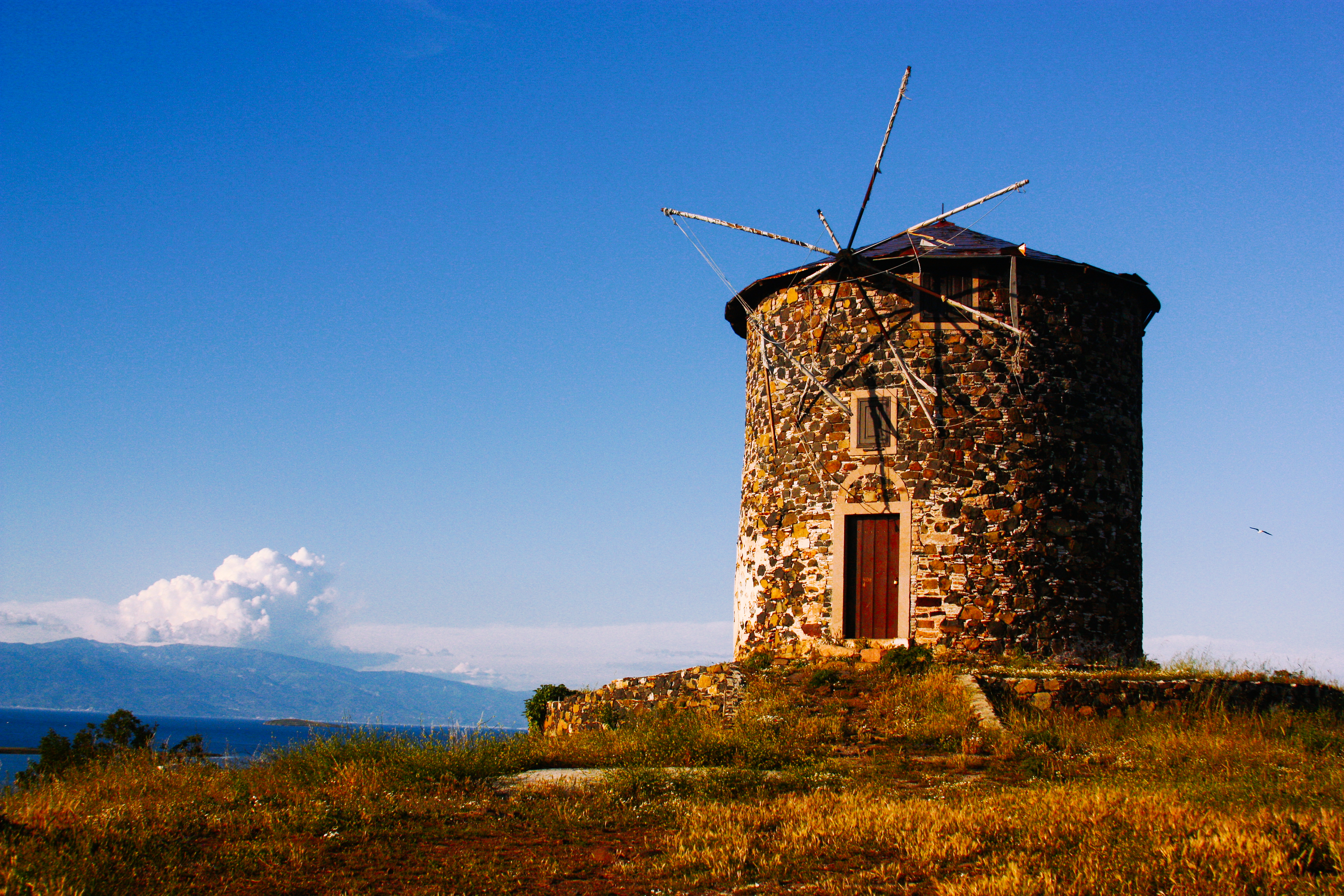
Cunda Island Windmill

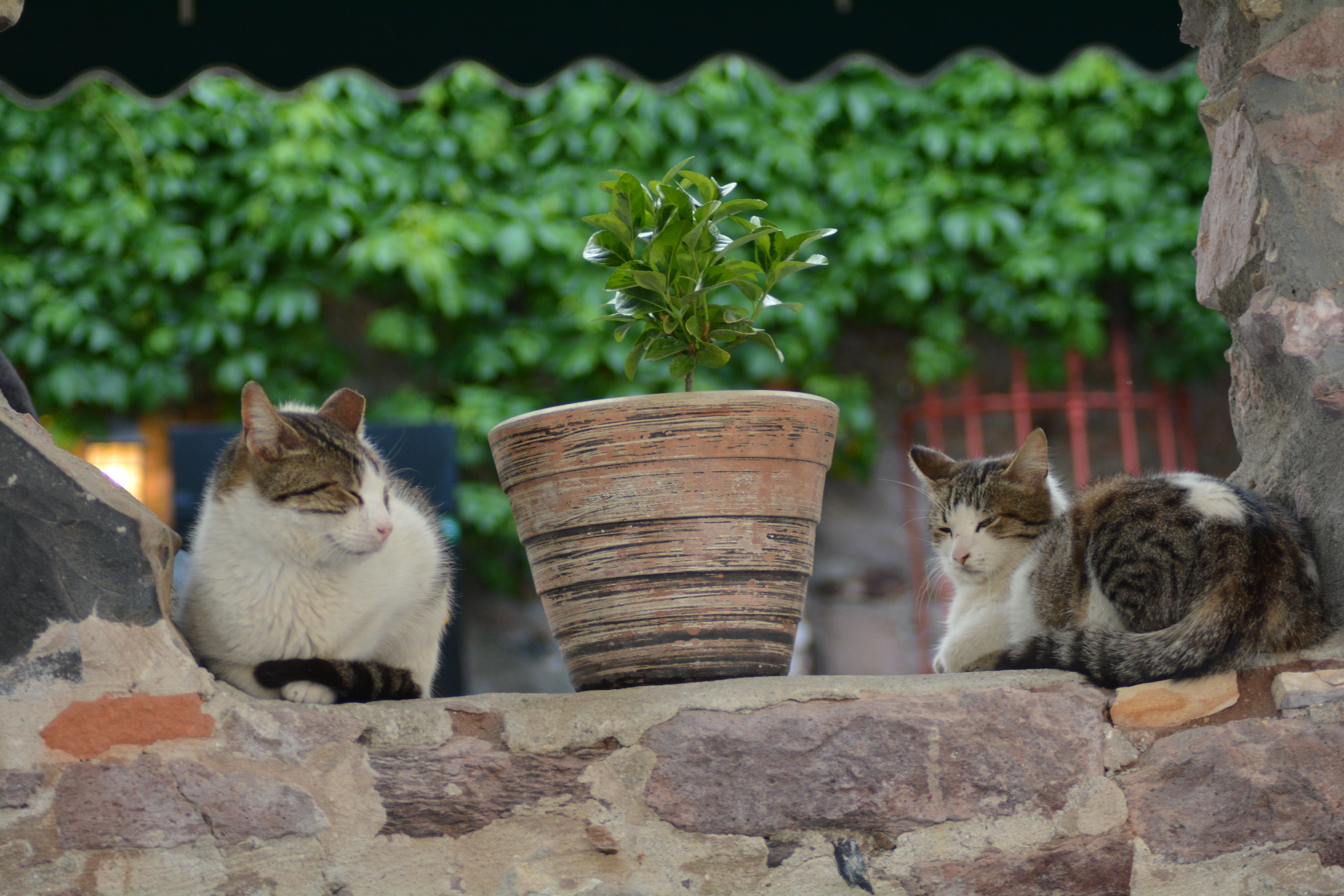
Cats of Cunda Island

== See also ==
- List of islands of Turkey
- Aegean Islands
