= Euthymius of Constantinople (11th century) =

Euthymius of Constantinople (fl. 1050) was a monk who wrote about the Bogomils.
