= Ambrosios Pleianthidis =

Greek Orthodox saint and bishop

Ambrosios of Moschonisia Αμβρόσιος Μοσχονησίων
- Metropolitan of Moschonisia
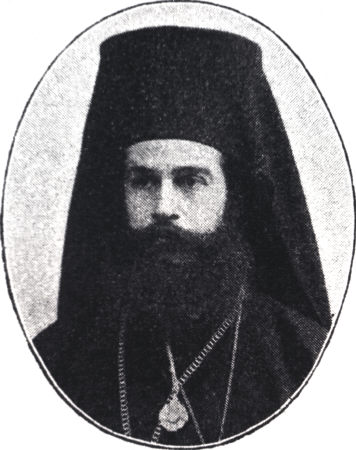
- Church: Greek Orthodox Church
- In office: February – September 1922

Personal details
- Born: 1872 Smyrna, Aidin vilayet, Ottoman Empire
- Died: 1922 (aged 49–50) Moschonisia, Ottoman Empire

Ambrosios Pleiathidis (Greek: Αμβρόσιος Πλειανθίδης, 1872–1922) also known as Ambrosios of Moschonisia was the Greek Orthodox metropolitan bishop of Moschonisia, in modern Turkey, from February to September 1922. He was executed by the Turkish Army at the end of the Greco-Turkish War (1919-1922).

He is commemorated by the Greek Orthodox Church as Hieromartyr (Greek: ιερομάρτυρας) and his feast day is celebrated on the Sunday before the Exaltation of the Holy Cross each year (September 7–13).

== Life ==
Ambrosios was born in Smyrna (modern İzmir), in the Aidin vilayet of the Ottoman Empire, in 1872. He graduated from the Evangelical School of his home town at 1893. After his graduation Ambrosios became an archdeacon in the nearby metropolis of Heliopolis and Thyateira, based in Aydın. He continued his studies and in 1895 he attended the Theolodigal Academy of Kiev and then he became a priest in the Greek community of Feodosiya in Crimea. In 1910 Ambrosios returned to Smyrna, where he preached in the local metropolis, under metropolitan Chrysostomos.

From 1919 Ambrosios is found on Cunda Island, part of a small island cluster off western Anatolian coast, which at that time was part of the Greek controlled Smyrna Occupation Zone. On February 19, 1922, he became metropolitan bishop of the newly created local metropolis of Moschonisia, based in Cunda. Following the developments of the Greco-Turkish War and the subsequent Greek defeat, the region of his metropolis came under the Turkish Nationalist Army. Most of the local population did not follow the retreating Greek Army. On the other hand, the Turkish troops arrested the remaining civilian population and sent them to labor battalions in the interior of Anatolia; the majority of them were executed, on September 15, 1922. Among these people was Ambrosios, who was buried alive after being tortured.
