= List of municipalities in Balıkesir Province =

This is the List of municipalities in Balıkesir Province, Turkey as of October 2007.

== Municipalities ==
List is sorted alphabetically A-Z, as Districts->Municipalities.

District	Municipality
Ayvalık	Altınova
Ayvalık	Ayvalık
Ayvalık	Küçükköy
Balıkesir (Merkez)	Balıkesir
Balıkesir	Kocaavşar
Balıkesir	Pamukçu
Balıkesir	Şamlı
Balya	Balya
Balya	Şifa
Bandırma	Aksakal
Bandırma	Bandırma
Bandırma	Edincik
Bigadiç	Bigadiç
Bigadiç	İskele
Burhaniye	Burhaniye
Burhaniye	Pelitköy
Dursunbey	Dursunbey
Edremit	Akçay
Edremit	Altınoluk
Edremit	Edremit
Edremit	Güre
Edremit	Kadıköy
Edremit	Zeytinli
Erdek	Erdek
Erdek	Karşıyaka
Erdek	Ocaklar
Gömeç	Gömeç
Gömeç	Karaağaç
Gönen	Gönen
Gönen	Sarıköy
Havran	Büyükdere
Havran	Havran
İvrindi	Büyükyenice
İvrindi	Gökçeyazı
İvrindi	İvrindi
İvrindi	Kayapa
İvrindi	Korucu
Kepsut	Kepsut
Manyas	Kızıksa
Manyas	Manyas
Manyas	Salur
Marmara	Avşa
Marmara	Marmara
Marmara	Saraylar
Savaştepe	Sarıbeyler
Savaştepe	Savaştepe
Sındırgı	Gölcük
Sındırgı	Sındırgı
Sındırgı	Yaylabayır
Sındırgı	Yüreğil
Susurluk	Göbel
Susurluk	Karapürçek
Susurluk	Susurluk

== Changes in 2014 ==
According to Law act no. 6360, belde (town) municipalities within provinces with more than 750,000 population (so called Metropolitan municipalities) were abolished as of 30 March 2014. 34 belde municipalities in the above list are now defunct. The list is kept for historical reference.
