= Ilıca–Palamutluk railway =

Ilıca–Palamutluk Railway Line
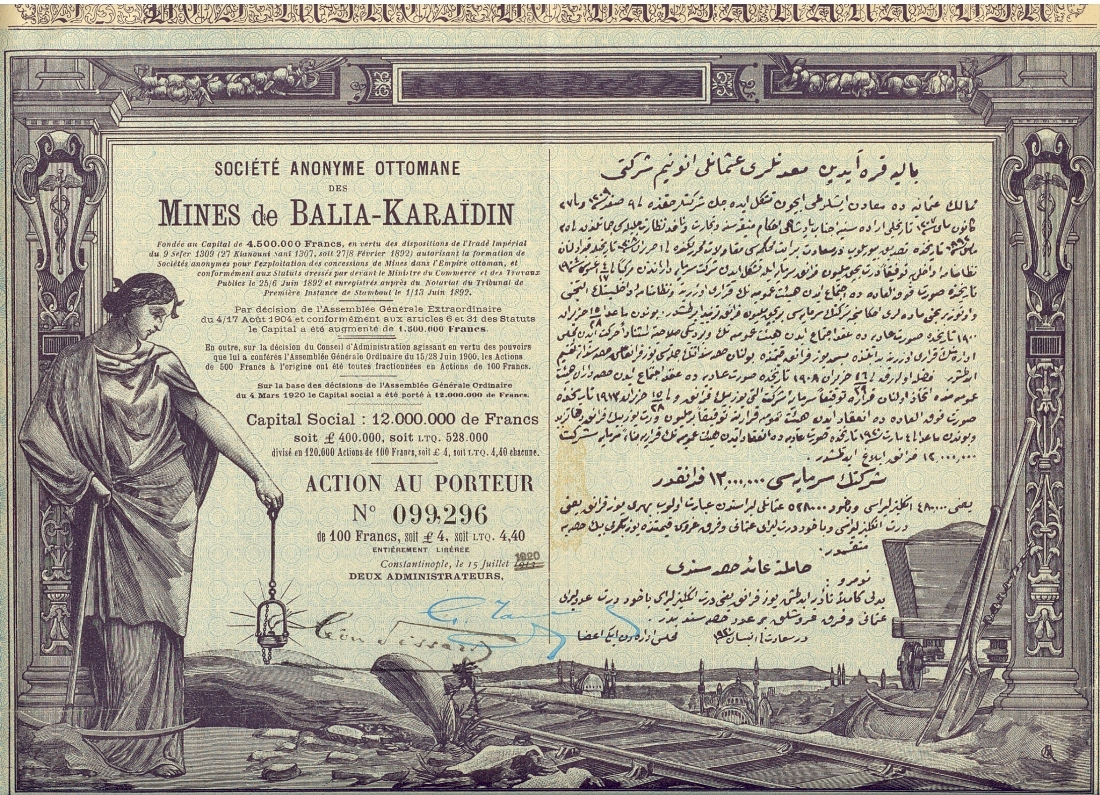
- An ore wagon and rail track were depicted prominently on share certificates for the Société Anonyme Ottomane des Mines de Balia-Karaïdin printed in 1913 and issued in 1920.

Overview
- Native name: Ilıca–Palamutluk Demiryol Hattı
- Status: Ceased operation
- Locale: Balıkesir Province, western Turkey
- Termini: Palamutluk; Ilıca
- Stations: 8

Service
- Type: Narrow-gauge railway
- Operator(s): 1924–1939: Ilıca-İskele–Palamutluk Demiryolu Türk Anonim Şirketi/Balya Kara Aydın Şirketi; 1942–1950: Turkish State Railways

History
- Opened: November 1, 1924
- Closed: 1950

Technical
- Line length: 28.391 km (17.641 mi)
- Track gauge: 750 mm (2 ft 5 1/2 in)
- Highest elevation: 0–120m

The Ilıca–Palamutluk Railway Line (Turkish:Ilıca–Palamutluk Demiryol Hattı) was a 28-kilometre (17 mi) narrow gauge railway route in Balıkesir Province, western Turkey that operated from 1924 until 1950. The line was built to transport galena lead ore that had been mined far to the east at Balya. The galena ore from Balya was transported to Palamutluk, a site at the base of the Aegean coast foothills, on an existing smaller-gauge line. The Ilıca–Palamutluk Line then took the ore onwards from Palamutluk via Edremit to a wharf at Ilıca on the Aegean coast.

== Background ==
Sites in the Balıkesir area had been mined for lead, silver and other metals since prehistoric times. The Romans mined lead at Balya Maden, known to them as Pericharaxis, on Mount Ida (modern Kaz Dağı). It is thought that much of the silver in Troy II came from this mine. There is also evidence for mining during the Byzantine and Ottoman periods. The deposits at Balya continued to be mined into modern times, yielding 7,600 tonnes of lead and 63 troy ounces (2.0 kg) of silver in 1903, for example.

From the late 19th century, the mines at Balya were operated by the Société Anonyme Ottomane des Mines de Balia-Karaïdin (known in Turkish as Balya Kara Aydın Şirketi). Ore was initially transported to the coast by mule and camel. Later (possibly as early as 1884), the mining company built the 62-kilometre (39 mi) Palamutluk–Balya–Mancılık railway to transport lead ore down the steep mountain route to a site on the coastal plain at Palamutluk (east of Havran, between the present-day villages of İnönü and Köylüce). The Palamutluk–Balya line used the Decauville company's system of portable 600 mm (1 ft 11 5/8 in) narrow-gauge tracks, with animals as the motive power. Ore was then carried on wagons from Palamutluk to a pier at Akçay on the coast for export to Europe.

== Construction ==
By the early 20th century, the terminus at Palamutluk was proving problematic and Yengi Efendi, the manager of the Balya mine, received authorization in 1917 to construct a new rail line from the coast to Palamutluk. Unsurprisingly, as the Ottoman Empire was engaged in World War I and the Turkish War of Independence, construction did not begin for several years.

In the early 1920s, Georges Ralli, the director of the Balya mine, opened negotiations with the new government of the Turkish Republic to build a "railway starting from the port of Ilidjé, on the Gulf of Edremid, and running to Palamoudlouk through Ak-Tchai, Edremid, and Hauran". In 1920 it was reported that approval had been granted for the line, which was to be about 28 kilometres (17 mi) long and use 750 mm (2 ft 5 1/2 in) track. Ralli's chosen site for the western terminus was the small port of Ilıca, which is now part of the village of Güre.

There appear to have been some delays to Ralli's plans, because it is recorded that he was also issued a 40-year concession to build and operate the line on 13 May 1923. Ralli transferred the rights to the "Ilıca-İskele–Palamutluk Demiryolu Türk Anonim Şirketi" (the Ilıca Pier–Palamutluk Railway Turkish Joint Stock Company, also known by the French title Société Anonyme Turque du Chemin de Fer Ilidja-Iskélé–Palamoutlouk). Other reports credit the construction directly to the French-funded Balya Kara Aydın Şirketi, with work starting on the Ilıca–Palamutluk line on 1 May 1923.

The 28-kilometre (17 mi) line was built with 750mm track as planned and opened to traffic on either 1 September or 1 November 1924 (reports vary). At Palamutluk the line connected with the 600 mm (1 ft 11 5/8 in) Palamutluk–Balya–Mancılık railway. Ore carried down from Balya on the animal-powered line was transferred to the new steam-powered line at Palamutluk.

=== Stations ===
The line served six principal stations and two intermediate halts:

- Ilıca, approximately 39.586°N 26.879°E
- Akçay at 39.5843°N 26.9188°E
- Zeytinli, approximately 39.614°N 26.949°E
- Tabakhaneler (halt)
- Edremit at 39.5887°N 27.0209°E
- Bostancı Köyü (halt), approximately 39.564°N 27.035°E
- Havran, approximately 39.558°N 27.100°E
- Palamutluk, approximately 39.567°N 27.167°E

== Operation ==
The new Ilıca–Palamutluk line ran from Palamutluk via Havran, Bostancı, Edremit, Tabakhaneler and Zeytinli to reach the north shore of the Gulf of Edremit at Akçay, where there was a pier, and terminate at a second pier at Ilıca. Ore and passenger trains were pulled by 7-ton locomotives. Infrastructure at Havran station included a station building, a warehouse, 10-tonne railcar scale, a 500-kilogram (1,100 lb) baggage scale and a water reservoir.

The line's owner appears to have struggled to achieve its targets for freight and passenger usage of the line. At the company's general meeting on 3 July 1926, shareholders heard that "the volume of traffic was rather small as the principal customer, the Sociétè de Balia, had only supplied a restricted tonnage and, on the other hand, the public has not quite yet familiarised itself with this new mode of transport". In its first 10 months of operation the line carried 18,482 long tons (18,779 t) of freight and 106,670 passengers. This resulted in a deficit of 19,652 Turkish lira during the period.

By 1939, the line employed 85 people. For passenger service, the railway had 10 dual-compartment carriages, each with a capacity of 32 people.

There was a 08:00 weekday departure from Havran taking students to Edremit with a return run at 18:00. In total, there were six weekdays runs between Palamutluk and Ilıca, carrying both passengers and freight. On Fridays, to serve Havran's weekly market, the railway offered a reduced tariff for animals and goods. During the summer months the railway would use all its carriages for special Sunday services to Akçay, returning late in the evening.

These summer services ran from 1 June to 15 September each year, and the railway published the timetable in advance in major newspapers for several years in the 1930s and early 1940s. During the summer period, the first passenger train left Edremit for Palamutluk at 07:00, with services through the day until 20:00, and until 22:00 on some Sundays. There were two daily departures from Palamutluk, nine from Havran, 13–14 from Edremit, 13–15 from Zeytinlik, 13–15 from Akçay and six or seven from Ilıca. No stops were scheduled at the Bostancı Köyü or Tabakhaneler halts. The schedule appears to have been planned for service by two passenger trains, with passing at Havran, Edremit, and Akçay stations. Both trains appear to have been kept at or near Edremit overnight.

The summer schedule also indicated five scheduled daily freight-only trains. Two ran east-bound, starting from Akçay, with scheduled stops at Edremit and Havran, terminating at Palamutluk. Three freight trains served the same stops west-bound. The freight services were concentrated between 10:00 and 14:00 daily, implying that the railway used at least four and maybe five locomotives for freight due to the overlapping schedule.

Plans were made in the 1930s for a "Balıkesir, Balya, Edremit and Aliağa Railway", which would have upgraded the tramway between Palamutluk and Balya to 750 mm (2 ft 5 1/2 in) gauge and extended the line at each end to allow service from the main line at Balıkesir all the way through to Aliağa on the coast. However, construction was never started and the ambitious project was shelved in the 1940s.

Service on the line was suspended on 15 October 1939, after which it was nationalized under Turkish State Railways (TCDD) on 13 May 1941 and service resumed on 29 October 1942. Also in the early 1940s, TCDD built a holiday camp and recreational facilities next to the Akçay station and pier. TCDD later added a retirement home for former employees at the same site.

== Closure ==
The fate of the line was raised in the Turkish Parliament on 28 December 1945, during a debate on the 1946 budget for the Directorate General of State Railways and Ports.

Balıkesir Representative Hayrettin Karan and Transport Minister Ali Fuat Cebesoy noted that formerly a tramway line had run from Ilıca via Edremit to Balya and stated that the Ilıca–Edremit–Palamutluk line remained in place. Karan noted that the Turkish State Railways operated passenger services along the Ilıca–Havran section whereas the Havran–Palamutluk section was unused. He outlined the benefits of connecting Burhaniye to Edremit by rail, noting that the Transport Ministry had completed a study but had shelved the project due to a shortage of materials and had chosen to put in place a bus service instead. Karan expressed his thanks for the bus service but argued that a rail line would shorten travel times and be a better long-term use of resources. In particular, he extolled the benefits of connecting manufacturing industries in the Edremit region to coal supplies from Soma.

Cebesoy proposed that part of the existing narrow-gauge line could be repurposed and extended to reach the coast via Burhaniye. He described the Palamutluk section as uneconomic, due to a lack of passengers or merchandise. In contrast, the real passenger and cargo traffic lay in the Havran–Edremit–Ilıca section, he said. Cebesoy proposed that the track could be removed from the Palamutluk section and relaid to connect with the commercial center and pier at Burhaniye. He cited the transport of coal from mines at Soma as an example of parliament's ability to boost economic output by investing in rail and tramway lines.

Cebesoy then reported the results of a study that showed that removing the tracks from the Havran–Palamutluk section and re-laying them along a route to Burhaniye would allow the railway to come within 800 m (0.5 mi) of that town. He said the gap into Burhaniye could be bridged with other track already owned by the railway, but urged parliament to consider extending the line west of Burhaniye to a pier on the Gulf of Edremit.

In October 1950, with production falling at the Balya lead mines, the route became uneconomic and operations ceased. By 1952, parliament was debating the liquidation of the Ilıca–Palamutluk and Mudanya–Bursa lines. The rails were torn up in 1959 and sold for scrap.

Several buildings from the railway still exist, including the stations in Edremit (on İstasyon Caddesi) and Akçay (now İstasyon Restaurant).

== See also ==
Narrow gauge railways in Turkey

== Sources ==
- "Ilıca–Palamutluk Demiryol". Akşam Gazetesi. 25 May 1936. p. 12.
- Atilla, A. Nedim (2002), İzmir Demiryolları [Izmir Railways] (in Turkish), İzmir Büyükşehir Belediyesi Kültür Yayını, ISBN 9789751800763
- Aydın, İbrahim (June 2006), "Madencilik-Şehirleşme İlişkisine Farkli Bir Örnek: Balya" [A Distinct Example for The Mining-Urbanization Relationship: Balya], Marmara Coğrafya Dergisi (in Turkish) (12), Istanbul: 133–148
- Bülbül, İsmail (December 2010), "Balya–Karaaydın Maden Şirketi İşçileri (1901–1922)" [The Workers of the Balya–Karaaydın Mining Company (1901–1922)] (PDF), Balıkesir Üniversitesi Sosyal Bilimler Enstitüsü Dergisi (Journal of the Balıkesir University Social Sciences Institute) (in Turkish), 13 (24), Balıkesir, Turkey: 227–240
- Cebesoy, Ali Fuat (28 December 1945), TBMM Tutanak Dergisi (Proceedings of the Turkish Parliament) Seventh Parliament, Year 4, 20 (21:1): 576–577
- Forbes, Robert James (1971). Metallurgy in Antiquity: A Notebook for Archaeologists and Technologists. Studies in Ancient Technology. Vol. 8 (2 ed.). Leiden: E.J. Brill. ISBN 9004026525.
- "General Meetings: Société Anonyme Turque du Chemin de Fer Ilidja—Iskélé—Palamoutlouk", Monthly Circular, Constantinople (Istanbul): Ottoman Bank: 45, September–October 1926
- Karan, Hayrettin (28 December 1945), TBMM Tutanak Dergisi (Proceedings of the Turkish Parliament) Seventh Parliament, Year 4, 20 (21:1): 571
- "Havran Treni" [The Havran Train]. Kent ve Demiryolu (in Turkish). September 10, 2009.
- "Railway Starting from the Port of Ilidjé...", The Near East, 18: 660, 1920
- Pernicka, E.; Eibner, C.; Öztunalı, Ö.; Wagner, G.A. (2003), "Early Bronze Age Metallurgy in the Northeast Aegean", Troia and the Troad: Scientific Approaches, Springer, pp. 143–172
- "Tarihte Bugün: 13 Mayıs 1923 Balya madenlerinin sahile taşınması için Ilıca-İskele-Palamutluk Hattı'nın..." [Today in History: May 13, 1923 The Ilıca-İskele-Palamutluk Line for the shipment of Balya mines...]. Ray Haber (in Turkish). 13 May 2012.
- "Mudanya Demiryolu Hattı nasıl kapatıldı (Foto Galeri)" [How the Mudanya Rail Line was Closed (Photo Gallery)]. Ray Haber (in Turkish). 27 March 2014.
- "Tarihte Bugün: 15 Ekim 1939 Ilıca—Palamutluk demiryolu trafiği..." [Today in History: 15 October 1939, Ilıca—Palamutluk Railway Traffic...]. Ray Haber (in Turkish). 15 October 2016.
- Yetkin, G. (1939), Yurdun Güzel Bir Köşesi Edremit [Edremit, A Beautiful Corner of the Homeland] (in Turkish), Balıkesir: Edremit Halkevi Yayını
