= Madra Mountains =

Madra Mountains are in western Anatolia, Aegean Region of Turkey. They are horst type geological formation. The highest point of the mountains is Maya Hill.

== Geography ==
They are located on the northern Aegean part of the western Anatolia and form the border of İzmir and Balikesir provinces of Turkey. In Balıkesir province they range on Ayvalık, Burhaniye, Havran and İvrindi district. In İzmir province they range on Bergama and Dikili district, in Manisa province only in Soma.

They are surrounded by the

- Bakırçay Valley in south
- Balıkesir plain and Kocadağ in north east
- Edremit gulf and Edremit and Havran plain in north west
- Ömer Mountain in east
- Dikili Gulf in west.

There are Madra Dam in the west and Kestel Dam in the east of the mountains.

== Economy and tourism ==
In Kozak Plateau of Madra Mountains region pinus pinea production is essential.

Near Aşağıbey village there is ruins of ancient city of Perperene and near Yukarıbey village there is ancient Trarion.
