= Palamutluk–Balya–Mancılık railway =

Palamutluk–Balya–Mancılık Railway
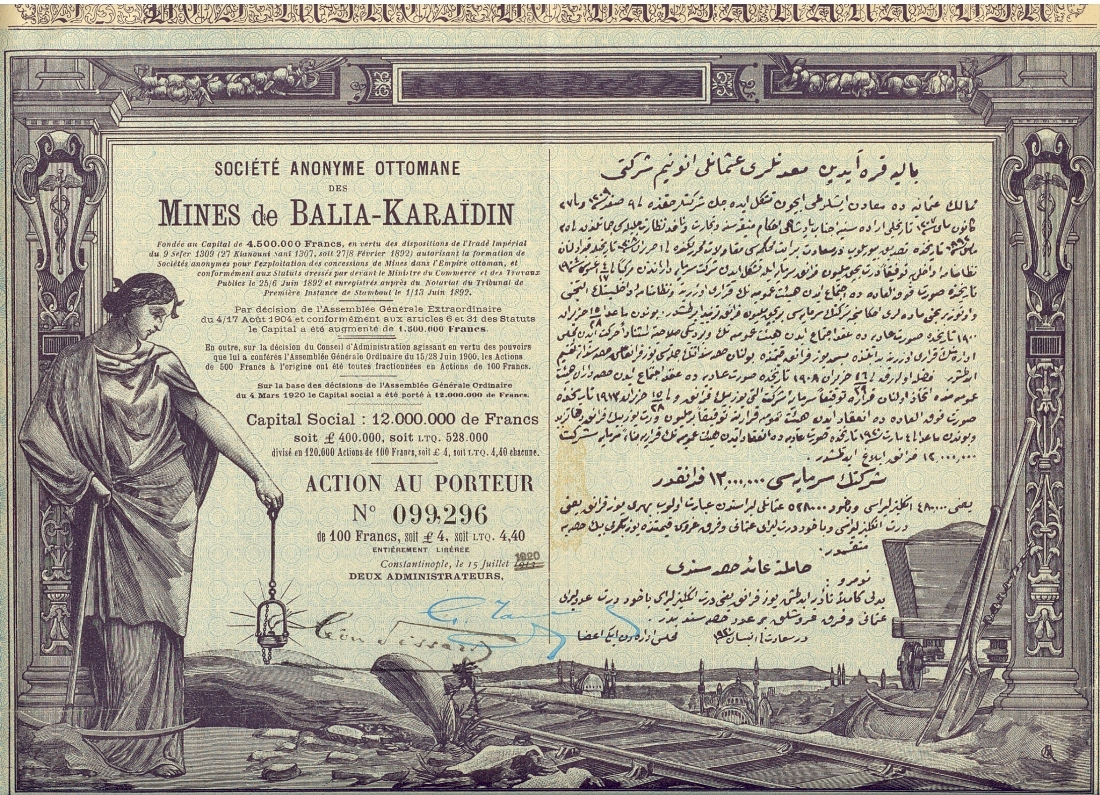
- An ore wagon and rail track were depicted prominently on share certificates for the Société Anonyme Ottomane des Mines de Balia–Karaïdin printed in 1913 and issued in 1920.

Overview
- Native name: Palamutluk–Balya–Mancılık Dekovil Hattı
- Status: Ceased operation
- Locale: Balıkesir Province, western Turkey
- Termini: Osmanlar (later Palamutluk); Balya (later Mancılık)

Service
- Type: Decauville narrow-gauge railway

History
- Opened: c. 1884
- Closed: by 1945

Technical
- Line length: 97.5 km (60.6 mi)
- Track gauge: 600 mm (1 ft 11 5/8 in)

The Palamutluk–Balya–Mancılık railway (Turkish: Palamutluk–Balya–Mancılık dekovil hattı) was a 97.5-kilometre (60.6 mi), horse-drawn, narrow-gauge railway in Balıkesir Province, western Turkey. The line used the Decauville system of portable track units and was built to link coal and lead mines to the coast for export. When completed the line ran from the lignite mine near Mancılık to the galena mines at Balya and then turned southwest to run through the village of Osmanlar to a terminus at Palamutluk. From Palamutluk, ore could be carried via road on horse carts to wharfs on the Gulf of Edremit. In 1923, the Palamutluk–Balya railway was linked to the Ilıca–Palamutluk railway, which replaced horse carts in transporting the ore to the coast.

== Mining history ==
Sites in the Balıkesir area have been mined for lead, silver and other metals since prehistoric times. The Romans mined lead at Balya Maden, known to them as Pericharaxis, on Mount Ida (modern Kaz Dağı). It is thought that much of the silver in Troy II came from this mine. There is also evidence for mining during the Byzantine and Ottoman periods.

With the advent of the industrialization in the late 19th century, production at Balya was expanded, initially by the Athens-based Société de Laurium. In 1892, the Balya mines were taken over by the French-funded Société Anonyme Ottomane des Mines de Balia–Karaïdin (known in Turkish as Balya Kara Aydın Şirketi).

The same company also owned "the most important lignite mines in Anatolia" working a thick seam that outcropped for 2.5 miles (4 km) near Mancılık, 35 kilometres (22 mi) north of Balya in the far northwest of the present-day Balıkesir Province. In the early 20th century, the coal-bearing strata could be traced for up to 10 kilometres (6 mi) in the hills 5 kilometres (3 mi) north of Mancılık.

== Railway construction ==
Lead ore from the expanded Balya operation was initially transported to the coast by mule and camel. Later the mining company built a narrow-gauge railway to help transport the partly smelted lead ore to the coast. The first rail lines may have been laid as early as 1884.

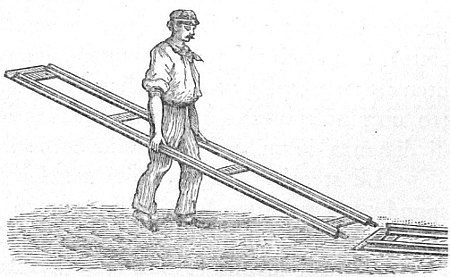
Installing Decauville track

By the time of a French report in 1899, the mining company was using horse-drawn rail wagons to move coal from Mancılık 30 kilometres (19 mi) south to factories and smelters at Balya. This railway used the Decauville company's system of portable 600 mm (1 ft 11 5/8 in) narrow-gauge tracks. The report also described plans for a rail line to transport the lead ore to the coast for export.

By 1902, the line continued from the Balya mines to the village of Osmanlar, 22 kilometres (14 mi) southwest, from where the ore was transported a further 66 kilometres (41 mi) to the coast at Akçay. In November 1906, the company succeeded in getting the Ottoman sultan's approval to extend the Decauville tracks from Osmanlar more than 40 kilometres (25 mi) west to Palamutluk (known as Valanidia in Greek). The new terminus lay on the plain east of Edremit, from where there was a good flat road covering the remaining 23 kilometres (14 mi) to the coast at Akçay. Work to lay out the route started in January 1907, but had to be postponed until spring due to a particularly harsh winter. The company projected that the extended line would open in the autumn of 1907, but in the event it was actually not completed until December 1907.

Once the extension was completed, the full narrow-gauge line ran 97.5 kilometres (60.6 mi) from the Mancılık coal mines via Balya and Osmanlar as far as Palamutluk.

== Accidents ==
Injuries and fatalities associated with the mine railway were recorded regularly in government statistics. In September 1939, the national newspaper Ulus reported that a Decauville train had collided with a wild buffalo between Balıkesir and İzmir (presumably on the Balya–Palamutluk line). The driver, Abdullah, had been unable to brake in time and as a result of the collision fell under the train, losing both his feet.

== Production ==
The lead deposits at Balya and the lignite from Mancılık produced a steady income for the operating company. In 1903, the mines at Balya yielded 7,600 tons of pig lead and 63 troy ounces (2.0 kg) of silver from 63,000 tons of ore. Production increased over the subsequent years with and average of 12,900 tons of argentiferous lead produced annually at Balya during 1910–13. The mine also produced 5,800 tons of blende, with a 41% zinc composition. The company's lignite production averaged 29,000 tons from 1908 to 1912. During these years, the company returned a 23% annual dividend to its investors.

== Closure ==
The Palamutluk–Balya tramway appears to have closed by 1945. During a debate in the Turkish Parliament on 28 December 1945 discussing the fate of the Ilıca–Palamutluk line, Balıkesir Representative Hayrettin Karan and Transport Minister Ali Fuat Cebesoy noted that formerly a tramway line had run from Ilıca to Balya and stated that only the Ilıca–Edremit–Palamutluk line remained in place.

== See also ==
Narrow gauge railways in Turkey

== Sources ==
- Aydın, İbrahim (June 2006), "Madencilik-Şehirleşme İlişkisine Farkli Bir Örnek: Balya" [A Distinct Example for The Mining-Urbanization Relationship: Balya], Marmara Coğrafya Dergisi (in Turkish) (12), Istanbul: 133–148
- "Bir mandanın sebeb olduğu facia" [An accident caused by a buffalo] (PDF). Ulus (in Turkish). 25 September 1939. p. 4.
- Bülbül, İsmail (December 2010), "Balya–Karaaydın Maden Şirketi İşçileri (1901–1922)" [The Workers of the Balya–Karaaydın Mining Company (1901–1922)] (PDF), Balıkesir Üniversitesi Sosyal Bilimler Enstitüsü Dergisi (Journal of the Balıkesir University Social Sciences Institute) (in Turkish), 13 (24), Balıkesir, Turkey: 227–240
- Dominian, Leon (12 June 1909), "Mineral Resources of the Turkish Empire", Mining and Scientific Press, 98: 821–826
- Dominian, Leon (1917), "Fuel in Turkey", Transactions of the American Institute of Mining, Metallurgical and Petroleum Engineers, 56: 237–256
- Forbes, Robert James (1971). Metallurgy in Antiquity: A Notebook for Archaeologists and Technologists. Studies in Ancient Technology. Vol. 8 (2 ed.). Leiden: E.J. Brill. ISBN 9004026525.
- "Havran Treni" [The Havran Train]. Kent ve Demiryolu (in Turkish). 10 September 2009.
- Karan, Hayrettin (28 December 1945). "Efendim, bizim Ege bölgesinde Balya madeninden satınalınmış bir dökovil hattımız vardır" [Sir, we have a narrow-gauge rail line that was purchased from the Balya mine in our Aegean Region.] (PDF). TBMM Tutanak Dergisi [Proceedings of the Turkish Parliament] (in Turkish) (Seventh Parliament, Year 4, 20, B:21, O:1): 571.
- "Mines de Balia-Karaïdin" [Balya Kara Aydın Mines], Journal des Chemins de Fer, des Mines et des Travaux Publics (in French), 58 (6245), 10 June 1899
- "Les Mines en Turquie" [Mines in Turkey], L'Asie Française (French Asia) (in French), 2 (10), Le Comité de l'Asie Française, January 1902
- Pernicka, E.; Eibner, C.; Öztunalı, Ö.; Wagner, G.A. (2003), "Early Bronze Age Metallurgy in the Northeast Aegean", Troia and the Troad: Scientific Approaches, Springer, pp. 143–172
- Prothero, George Walter, ed. (1920). Anatolia. Handbooks Prepared under the Direction of the Historical Section of the Foreign Office. London: H.M. Stationery Office.
- Rapport du Conseil d'Administration et Rapport du Commissaire des Comptes: Assemblée Générale Ordinaire [Management Board's and Auditor's Reports to the Annual General Meeting] (in French), Société Anonyme Turque des Mines de Balia-Karaïdin, 1907
- Rapport du Conseil d'Administration et Rapport du Commissaire des Comptes: Assemblée Générale Ordinaire [Management Board's and Auditor's Reports to the Annual General Meeting] (in French), Société Anonyme Turque des Mines de Balia-Karaïdin, 1908
