= Antandrus =

Ancient Greek city

- Ἄντανδρος (Ancient Greek)
- Location within Turkey
- 39°34′33″N 26°47′26″E
- Type: Settlement
- Location: Altınoluk, Balıkesir Province, Turkey
- Region: Troad

Antandrus or Antandros (Ancient Greek: Ἄντανδρος) was an ancient Greek city on the north side of the Gulf of Adramyttium in the Troad region of Anatolia. Its surrounding territory was known in Greek as Ἀντανδρία (Antandria), and included the towns of Aspaneus on the coast and Astyra to the east. It has been located on Devren hill between the modern village of Avcılar and the town of Altınoluk in the Edremit district of Balıkesir Province, Turkey.

== Location ==
The geographer Strabo located Antandrus in the Troad on the southern flank of Mount Ida, east of Assos and Gargara, but west of Aspaneus, Astyra, and Adramyttium. The first clue which led to its rediscovery in modern times was found by the German geographer and Classical scholar Heinrich Kiepert in 1842. He found an inscription relating to Antandrus in the wall of a mosque at Avcılar. Returning in 1888, he found a further inscription at Avcılar and, due to the discovery by locals of many Greek, Roman, and Byzantine era coins in the vicinity of a nearby hill called Devren, he was also able to locate the acropolis of Antandrus on this spot. The British archaeologist John Cook surveyed the site in 1959 and 1968, discovering further evidence of a Greek settlement.

== Foundation ==
Conflicting traditions regarding the foundation of Antandrus circulated in antiquity. According to the Lesbian poet Alcaeus at the turn of the 7th century BC, Antandrus was founded by the Leleges, a people whom the Greeks believed to be aboriginal to Anatolia. The 5th century BC historian Herodotus likewise posited non-Greek origins for Antandrus, stating that it was a Pelasgian foundation. Thucydides, writing a few decades after Herodotus in the late 5th century BC, is the first source to suggest Greek origins to Antandrus by saying it was an Aeolian foundation, a claim also found in the Byzantine lexicographer Stephanus of Byzantium, who named a leader of the Aeolians called Antandrus as the city's founder. However, a tradition of non-Greek origins persisted. A century later Aristotle explained its epithets Ἠδωνίς (Edonis) and Κιμμερίς (Kimmeris) as referring, respectively, to the city's foundation by a Thracian tribe, the Edonians, and to a period of a century when the nomadic Cimmerians from southern Russia had controlled the city. Demetrius of Scepsis (c. 205 - c. 130 BC) gives a different version again in which Antandrus was originally inhabited by Cilicians from the plain of Thebe facing the Gulf of Adramyttium (not to be confused with Cilicia in south-east Turkey).

In the reign of Augustus the Greek mythographer Conon provided two alternative explanations for the origins of Antandrus. Both etymologize Ἄντανδρος (Antandros) as ἀντ’ Ἄνδρου (ant' Androu), exploiting the meaning 'in the stead of' of the Greek preposition ἀντί (anti). In the first, Ascanius the son of Aeneas used to rule the city of Antandrus until he was captured by the Pelasgians; the ransom for his release was to give over the city, thus ἀντ’ ἄνδρου meaning '(a city) in the stead of/in exchange for a man (so ἄνδρου from ἄνδρος, the Greek genitive singular of ἀνήρ, 'man', i.e. Ascanius)'. This interpretation combines the reference to the city's Pelasgian origins in Herodotus and its brief role in Virgil's Aeneid as the place from which Aeneas and the Trojans flee to the west. In the second explanation, the founders of Antandrus were exiles from the Cycladic island of Andros, who on being expelled set up a new home called Antandrus, hence ἀντ’ Ἄνδρου meaning 'in place of Andros'.

== Excavation ==
Until recently, the site of Antandrus had only been subjected to a basic surface survey, and so there was no archaeological evidence available to determine whether early Greek traditions about a pre-Greek settlement at this site had any historical validity. Recent Turkish excavations at the site may change this picture: finds of Greek pottery from the necropolis have been announced on the excavation's website which date to the late 8th and early 7th century BC, pre-dating previous surface finds by almost two centuries. Early indications suggest that the material culture of Antandrus in this period was overwhelmingly Greek, suggesting that it was already a Greek settlement at this period, rather than an Anatolian community which traded extensively with neighbouring Greek communities. However, firm conclusions regarding this and many other aspects of the site's archaeology must await the final publication of the site report.

== History ==
The Lesbian city of Mytilene controlled extensive parts of the Troad in the Archaic period, and so Alcaeus' reference to Antandrus may suggest interest in or control over the city by Mytilene at the turn of the 7th century. Alternatively, the persistent early tradition of the city's Anatolian origins (e.g. in Alcaeus, Herodotus, Demetrius of Scepsis) may indicate that its Anatolian population remained independent of Mytilene until later in the 6th century BC; the little archaeology which has been done on the site suggests Greek occupation at no earlier a date than this.

The first event in Antandrus' history is when in 512 BC Otanes, the Persian satrap of Hellespontine Phrygia, captured the city while subduing north-west Asia Minor. Antandrus had access to large amounts of timber from Mount Ida as well as pitch, making it an ideal location for the construction of large fleets, giving the city strategic importance. In 424 BC during the Peloponnesian War when the city had been captured by exiles from Mytilene, the historian Thucydides explains that:

Their plan was to liberate the other cities also, which are known as the Actaean cities, and which used to be the possessions of Mytilene, but now were held by Athens, and they attached particular importance to Antandrus. Once they established themselves there it would be easy for them to build ships, since there was timber on the spot, and Ida was so close; other supplies would also be available, and, with this base in their hands, they could easily make raids on Lesbos, which was not far away, and subdue the Aeolian towns on the mainland.

This importance is likewise attested by Xenophon later in the Peloponnesian War in 409 and 205 BC, and is perhaps reflected in Virgil's choice of the city as the place where Aeneas builds his fleet before setting off to Italy. As late as the 14th century we hear of Antandrus being used by an Ottoman admiral to construct a large fleet of several hundred ships. Having joined the Delian League in 427 BC, when Antandrus first appears in the Athenian tribute lists in 425/42BC, it has an assessment of 8 talents, again indicating the city's relative prosperity.

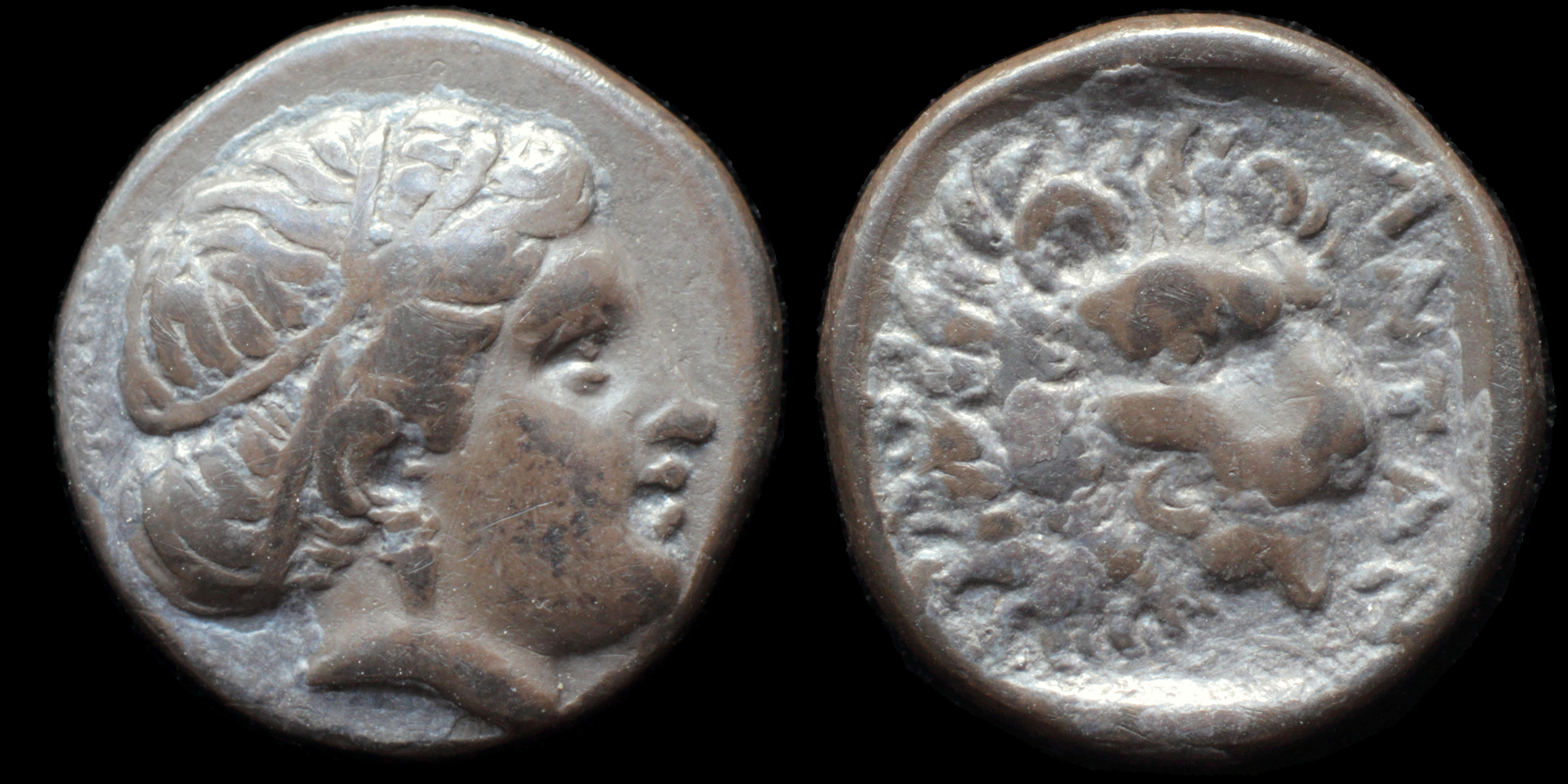
O: female head (Artemis Astyrene?) R: lion head within incuse square, ANTAN this silver diobol was struck in Antandrus in the late 5th century BC ref.: CNG E-369, 113; Gitbud & Naumann 24, 170

In 411/10 BC Antandrus expelled its Persian garrison with the help of Peloponnesian troops who were stationed at Abydos on the Hellespont. Having briefly won its freedom, it quickly returned to Persian control, and in 409 BC the Pharnabazus constructed a fleet for the Peloponnesians here using the abundant timber of Mount Ida. We do not know how the Persians regained Antandrus, but in 409 BC the Syracusans gained the Antandrians' friendship by helping to rebuild their fortifications, suggesting that a siege had taken place in the previous year. In the summer of 399 BC Xenophon's Ten Thousand passed through on their way home from Persia, and he later wrote in his Hellenica of the city's continuing strategic importance during the Corinthian War (395-387 BC).

After the Classical period, references to Antandrus become scarce in surviving sources. The next reference to events at Antandrus comes several centuries later c. 200 BC, when Antandrus was on the route of Delphic thearodokoi, and in the 2nd century BC an inscription from Antandrus tells us that the city sent judges to Peltai in Phrygia to arbitrate a dispute. From c. 440 - c. 284 BC, Antandrus had minted its own coinage; this began again in the reign of the Emperor Titus (AD 79-81) and continued until the reign of Elagabalus (AD 218-222). In the Byzantine period Antandrus was an episcopal see in the metropolis of Ephesus.

== Archaeology ==
In 2018, archaeologists unearthed Pithos burials. The Antandrus necropolis served from the eighth century B.C. to the first century A.D. Same year a stele was discovered, dating back to the 2nd century BC. It includes a statement related to the commendation of a commander, who was sent to Antandrus by the King of Pergamon Eumenes and his brother Attalus. In 2021, new Pithos burials were discovered. In 2022, tombs from the 3rd, 4th and 5th centuries BC were discovered.

== See also ==
- Ancient sites of Balıkesir

== Bibliography ==
- O. Hirschfeld, RE I (1893) s.v. Antandros (1), col. 2346.
- A. Plassart, ‘Inscriptions de Delphes: la liste de théorodoques’ BCH 45 (1921) 1-85.
- J.M. Cook, The Troad (Oxford, 1973) 267-71.
- J.M. Cook, ‘Cities in and around the Troad’ ABSA 56 (1988) 7-19.
- C. Carusi, Isole e Peree in Asia Minore (Pisa, 2003) 31-2.
- S. Mitchell, 'Antandrus' in M.H. Hansen and T.H. Nielsen (eds.), An Inventory of Archaic and Classical Poleis (Oxford, 2004) no. 767.
