= Ayvacik (Canakkale) Swarm =

2017 series of earthquakes in Turkey

The Ayvacik (Canakkale, Turkey) earthquake swarm was a series of earthquakes that occurred in 2017 at the Ayvacik – Gurpinar earthquake zone in Marmara region of Turkey. This was an earthquake of magnitude 5.5 on the moment magnitude scale. The epicenter of earthquakes in the swarm was at a distance of around 10 km average and covers a South West tip of the Biga Peninsula.

== Cause ==
The area is tectonically active and houses the Southern branch of the North Anatolian Fault and multiple local faults. The location of the earthquakes is thought to be one of the local faults. It is believed that drilling activities in the area increase the risk of earthquakes.

== Hoax ==
Some locals believe that the quakes were triggered by drilling activities associated with the exploration and production of geothermal resources. Note that the depth production well in the region varies between 1300m to 1900m. One politician has claimed that the earthquakes were created by means of electromagnetic waves.
