= Astyra (Aeolis) =

Ancient town of Aeolis near Antandros

Coordinates: 39°33′37″N 27°10′42″E

Astyra (Ancient Greek: Ἄστυρα), also known as Astyrum or Astyron (Ἄστυρον), and perhaps also Andeira (Ἀνδειρα), was a small town of ancient Aeolis and of Mysia, in the Plain of Thebe, between Antandrus and Adramyttium. It had a temple of Artemis, of which the Antandrii had the superintendence. Artemis had hence the name of Astyrene or Astirene. There was a lake Sapra near Astyra, which communicated with the sea. Pausanias, from his own observations, describes a spring of black water at Astyra; the water was hot. But he places Astyra in the territory of Atarneus. There was, then, either a place in Atarneus called Astyra, with warm springs, or Pausanias has made some mistake; for there is no doubt about the position of the Astyra of Strabo and Pomponius Mela. Astyra was a deserted place, according to Pliny's authorities; he calls it Astyre. There are said to be coins of Astyra.

It was a member of the Delian League.

Its site is tentatively located near Büyük Çal Tepe, Balıkesir Province, Turkey.
