= Zeytinli =

- Neighbourhood
- Location in Turkey Zeytinli (Marmara)
- Coordinates: 39°37′0″N 26°56′54″E
- Country: Turkey
- Province: Balıkesir
- District: Edremit
- Population (2022): 3,431
- Time zone: UTC+3 (TRT)

Zeytinli is a neighbourhood of the municipality and district of Edremit, Balıkesir Province, Turkey. Its population is 3,431 (2022). Before the 2013 reorganisation, it was a town (belde).

Zeytinli is between Akçay and Edremit. In the 1990s, with Akçay being recognized throughout the country as a holiday neighborhood, Zeytinli gained importance and developed its tourism sector. The district is named after the most important economic activity of the region, zeytin ("olives"). The main Zeytinli neighborhood is on the foothills of Kazdağı (Mount Ida). The coastline of Zeytinli has been developed with the construction of many summer houses. Zeytinli has a market and many shops known for selling olive oil.

Zeytinli hosts the Zeytinli Rock Festival, which saw around 90 artists perform in 2019, mostly from Turkey. These included Şebnem Ferah, Athena, Teoman and Selda Bağcan. The festival was attended by 32,000 people in 2019.
