= Biga Peninsula =

Peninsula in the Republic of Turkey

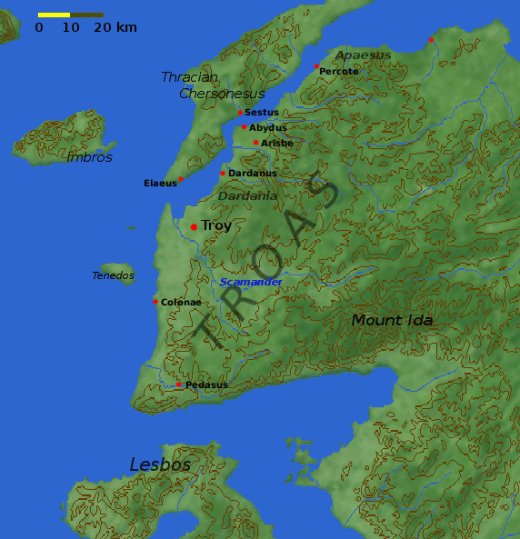
Biga Peninsula during the Bronze Age

Biga Peninsula (Turkish: Biga Yarımadası) is a peninsula in Turkey, in the northwest part of Anatolia. It is also known by its ancient name Troad (Troas).

The peninsula is bounded by the Dardanelles Strait and the southwest coast of the Marmara Sea to the north, Aegean Sea to the west and the Edremit gulf to the south. The eastern border of the peninsula is Gönen creek close to Kapıdağ Peninsula. Cape Baba at 39°28′46″N 26°03′49″E is the westernmost point of Anatolia The main mountain of the peninsula is Kaz Mountain (Mount Ida of the antiquity). Among the seven rivers or creeks, Karamenderes River (Scamander of the antiquity) and Biga River (Granikos of the antiquity) are the longest. Karamenderes discharges to Dardanelles Strait and Biga River discharges to the Marmara Sea.

Most of the peninsula is a part of the Çanakkale Province, except for a small part at the southeast, belonging to the Balıkesir Province. The most important settlement of the peninsula is Çanakkale, the capital of the province. The district centers are the other important settlements. The population as of 2022 is as follows:

District	Population (Including rural area)
Çanakkale (Central district)	197,841
Biga	92,180
Çan	47,954
Ayvacık	34,549
Ezine	31,848
Yenice	30,587
Lapseki	29,336
Bayramiç	28,952

There are also some of the important ancient settlements in the peninsula. Assos is situated at the South of the peninsula. Ancient Troy now included in the list of World heritage site is also in the peninsula close to Çanakkale.
