= Xenocles of Adramyttium =

Xenocles of Adramyttium (in Greek: Ξενοκλής ο Αδραμυττηνός) was an ancient Greek renowned orator, mentioned by Strabo.

Xenocles hailed from Adramyttium, an ancient Greek city in Asia Minor.

Rushing to ancient Rome and speaking before the Roman Senate, Xenocles effectively refuted the various accusations that had been made - that the entire region, the province of Asia, was friendly towards Mithridates.

It is noted that the orator Xenocles was a contemporary of Cicero, with whom he was greatly friends, a relationship that developed during the latter's stay in Asia in 78 BC

== Bibliography ==
- Plutarch. Cicero.
- Strabo. Geography. Book VIII.
- Cicero. "Brutus." The Latin Library. http://thelatinlibrary.com/cicero/brut.shtml.
