= Narrow-gauge railways in Turkey =

There are currently no common-carrier narrow-gauge railways in Turkey.

== Historical ==
- The Palamutluk–Balya–Mancılık railway, a 600 mm (1 ft 11 5/8 in) gauge, 97.5-kilometre (60.6 mi) line serving coal and lead mines, operating as early as 1884 and closed by 1945.
- The Ilıca–Palamutluk railway, a 750 mm (2 ft 5 1/2 in) gauge, 28-kilometre (17 mi) line operating from 1924 until 1950. It connected with the 600mm gauge Balya line and transported ore and coal to the coast for shipment.
- Samsun–Çarşamba Railway Line, 750 mm (2 ft 5 1/2 in) gauge, 37 km of a planned 150 km line was actually built, from Samsun to Çarşamba and was closed in 1971.
- Chemin de Fer Moudania Brousse (Mudanya Bursa Railway) in Bursa, 42 km 1,067 mm (3 ft 6 in) gauge, closed in 1948.
- A 600 mm (1 ft 11 5/8 in) gauge railway for the construction of the standard-gauge Baghdad Railway.

== Park railway ==
- Eskişehir Sazova park railway, 600 mm (1 ft 11 5/8 in) gauge, a line of 1200m was built at the campus of Osman Gazi Universitesi (OGÜ) in Eskişehir, later transferred to Savova park, where a circuit line was built.(in service)(?)

== Children's railways ==
Three 600 mm (1 ft 11 5/8 in) gauge children's railways were built in Turkey.

- Afyon children railway in Afyon (closed)
- Ankara Gençlik Park Railway, in Ankara (removed)
- İzmir International Fair Park Railway in İzmir (removed)
