= Samsun–Çarşamba railway =

Railway line in Turkey

Samsun–Çarşamba Railway Line
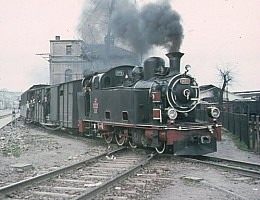
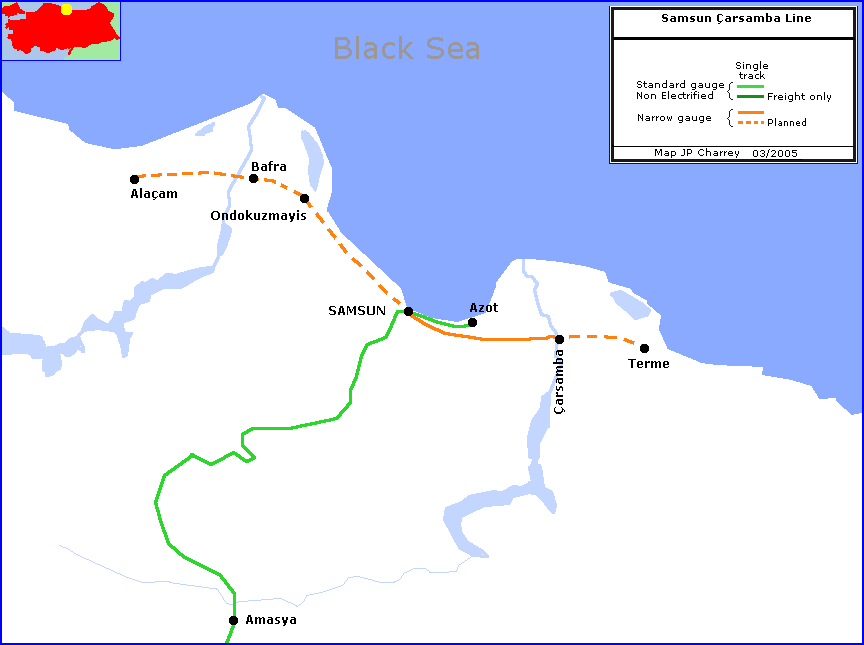
- Krauss or Henschel steam locomotive 34801 in the 1970s. Col. Mahmut Zeytinoglu Map of the Samsun-Çarsamba line

Technical
- Line length: 37 km
- Track gauge: 750 mm (2 ft 5 1/2 in)

The Samsun–Çarşamba Railway Line (Turkish:Samsun–Çarşamba Demiyol Hattı) was a 37 km-long narrow gauge railway line from Samsun to Çarşamba.

== History ==
First discussions about constructing a coastal railway connecting the Çarşamba and Bafra plains to the Samsun port commenced during the planning of the Samsun–Kalın railway. It was proposed to build the Samsun coastal railway in two phases; initially from Samsun to the Çarşamba plain and subsequently from Samsun to the Bafra plain. The first plans for the Samsun–Çarşamba railway were made in 1873 and the construction of the Samsun–Bafra railway was decided in 1890.

However, the plans were not realized during the Ottoman period but put forward again in the Republican period. A contractual arrangement between the tobacco exporters Nemlizadeler and Nafia Nezareti had the objective, to connect the Çarşamba and Bafra ports to the port of Samsun with a scheduled start date of 6 December 1923. Nemlizadeler founded therefore the Samsun Coastal Railways Turkish Incorporated Company (Turkish: Samsun Sahil Demiryolları Türk Anonim Şirketi).

In 1924 the Nemlizadeler family obtained a 75-year concession to build a 750mm gauge railway line from Alacam through Bafra, Samsun, Çarşamba to Terme. The line was planned to be 150 km long. The groundbreaking ceremony was performed by Mustafa Kemal Atatürk with a silver pick and shovel on 16. September 1924 in Samsun.

The Samsun–Çarşamba railway was completed and inaugurated on 1 September 1926. The company planned to start with the construction of the Samsun–Bafra railway in 1927, but in 1928 the family went through heavy financial problems and the rest of the construction was canceled. TCDD took over the line in 1929. TCDD closed the line in 1971.

== Locomotives ==
A total of four coal-fired steam locomotives built from 1924 onwards by Krauss and Henschel in Germany were used on the railway line:

Engine axle type	1'C't (2-6-0T)
Weight empty	22.2 t (49,000 lb)
Weight service	28.4 t (63,000 lb)
Wheels (coupled)	900 mm (35 in)
Wheels (uncoupled)	680 mm (27 in)
Number of cylinder	2
Cylinder dia	350 mm (14 in)
Piston stroke	450 mm (18 in)
Pressure	12 kg/cm² (28,4 psi)
Heating surface firebox	34.4 m^{2} (370 sq ft)
Heating surface superheater	15.1 m^{2} (163 sq ft)
Grate areas	1.0 m^{2} (11 sq ft)

== See also ==
Narrow gauge railways in Turkey
