= Trarium =

Town of ancient Mysia

Coordinates: 39°15′00″N 27°03′49″E

Trarium or Trarion (Ancient Greek: Τράριον) was a town of ancient Mysia, not far from Perperena.

Its site is located near Yukarı Beyköy, Asiatic Turkey.
