= Aspaneus =

Ancient town in Turkey

Coordinates: 39°34′14″N 26°48′26″E

Aspaneus (Ancient Greek: Ἀσπανεύς) was a town of the ancient Troad, within the territory of Antandrus.

Its site is located near Avcılar, Asiatic Turkey.
