= Güre, Edremit =

Güre
- Neighbourhood
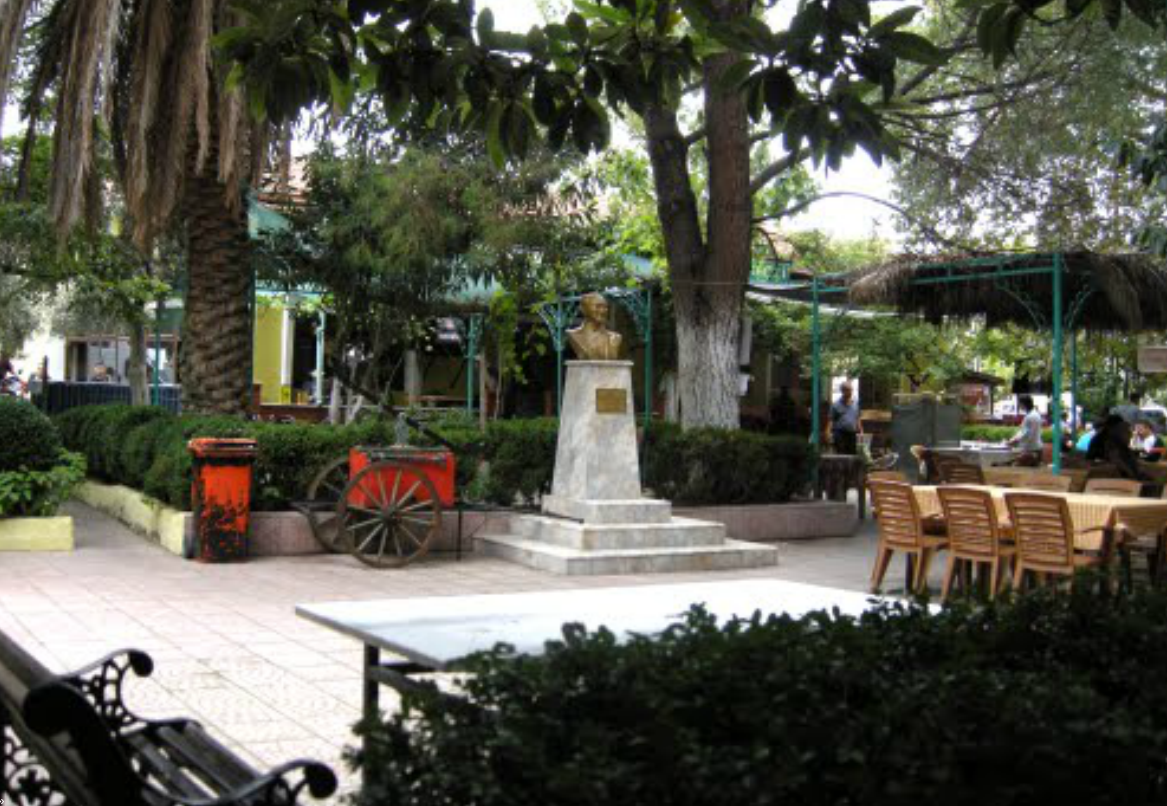
- The square of Güre Village

- Location within Turkey Location within Marmara
- Coordinates: 39.5931°N 26.8853°E
- Country: Turkey
- Province: Balıkesir
- District: Edremit
- Population (2022): 2,659
- Time zone: UTC+3 (TRT)
- Postal code: 10870
- Area code: 0266

Güre is a summer resort and neighbourhood of the municipality and district of Edremit, Balıkesir Province, Turkey. Its population is 2,659 (2022). Before the 2013 reorganisation, it was a town (belde). It is located 12 km west of Edremit, at the northern coast of Edremit Gulf and on Mount Ida's foothills.

"Sarıkız Fest" is the traditional festival in the town, which is organized by the municipality between 24 and 26 August of every year.
