= Perperene =

Ancient city now in Turkey

Coordinates: 39°15′37″N 26°57′47″E

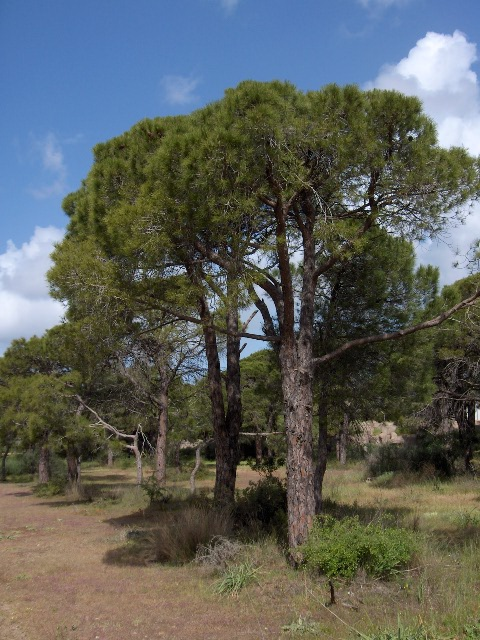
Environment of Perperene occupied by pinus pinea.

Perperene (Ancient Greek: Περπερηνή Perperini) or Perperena (Περπερήνα Perperina) was a city of ancient Mysia on the south-east of Adramyttium, in the neighbourhood of which there were copper mines and good vineyards. It was an Aeolian colony.

Stephanus of Byzantium calls it Parparon (Παρπάρων), an Aeolian city in Asia, and notes that some referred to the place as Perperene (Περπερηνή). He further explains that the male inhabitant was called a Parparonian (Παρπαρώνιος), derived from the genitive Parparonos (Παρπάρωνος), with a corresponding feminine form (Parparonia; Παρπαρωνία), while Androtion, in the third book of his Atthis, used the ethnic Parpariotes, a formation that appears to presuppose a place name Parparia (Παρπαρία) rather than Parparon.

Ptolemy calls it Perpere or Permere. According to the Suda, Hellanicus of Lesbos, a 5th-century BC Greek logographer, died at Perperene at age 85. At a later date it was given the name Theodosiopolis or Theodosioupolis (Θεοδοσιούπολις).

It is located near Aşagı Beyköy, on the Kozak plateau near Bergama in the İzmir Province of Turkey in western Anatolia.

== Ecclesiastical history ==
Perperene was the seat of a bishop; no longer a residential bishopric, it remains a titular see of the Roman Catholic Church.
