= Altınoluk =

- Neighbourhood
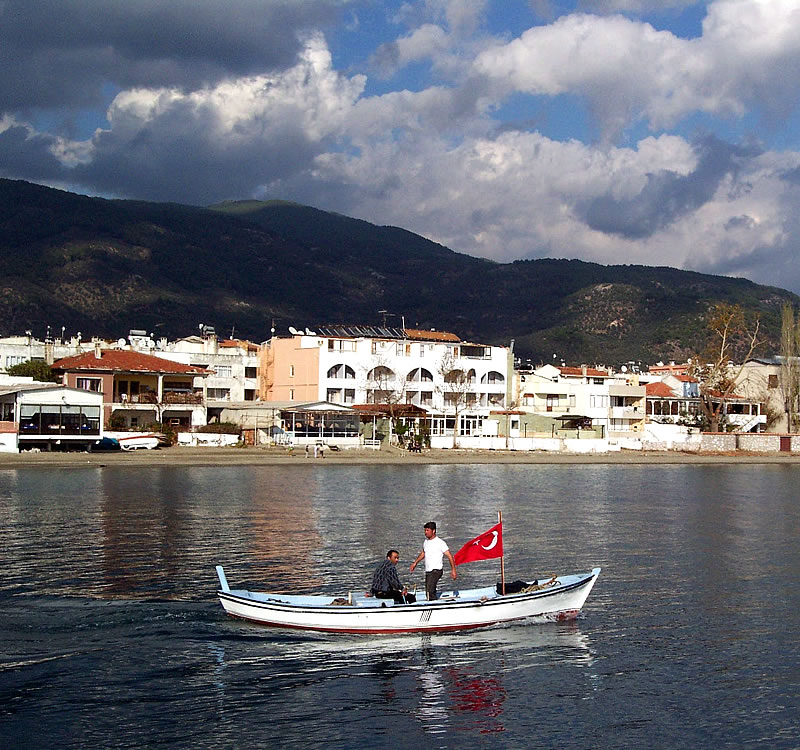

- Location within Turkey Location within Marmara
- Coordinates: 39.58234°N 26.73935°E
- Country: Turkey
- Province: Balıkesir
- District: Edremit
- Population (2022): 7,004
- Time zone: UTC+3 (TRT)
- Postal code: 10870
- Area code: 0266

Altınoluk, formerly Papazlık, is a summer resort and neighbourhood of the municipality and district of Edremit, Balıkesir Province, Turkey. Its population is 7,004 (2022). Before the 2013 reorganisation, it was a town (belde). It is located 25 km (16 mi) west of Edremit, at the northern coast of Edremit Gulf and on Mount Kazdağı hills.

The ancient city Antandrus, Kazdağı National Park and Şahindere Canyon are visitor attractions around Altınoluk.
