= Polymedium =

Town in ancient Aeolis

Coordinates: 39°27′42″N 26°08′57″E

Polymedium or Polymedion (Ancient Greek: Πολυμήδειον), also known as Palamedium or Polymedia, was a small town in ancient Aeolis, between the promontory Lectum and Assus, and at a distance of 40 stadia from the former.

Its site is located near Asarlık, Asiatic Turkey.
