= Gargara =

Ancient Greek city

- Γάργαρα (Ancient Greek)
- Location within Turkey
- 39°35′10″N 26°32′3″E
- Type: Settlement
- Periods: Archaic Greece to Byzantine Empire
- Location: Ayvacık, Çanakkale Province, Turkey
- Region: Troad

History
- Built: 6th century BCE
- Abandoned: No sooner than the 9th century CE, possibly as late as the 14th

Gargara (Ancient Greek: Γάργαρα) was an ancient Greek city on the southern coast of the Troad region of Anatolia. It was initially located beneath Mount Gargaron, one of the three peaks of Mount Ida, today known as Koca Kaya (39°35′10″N 26°32′03″E). At some point in the 4th century BCE the settlement moved approximately 5.8 km south of Koca Kaya to a site on the small coastal plain near the modern villages of Arıklı and Nusratlı (39°32′22″N 26°32′46″E), at which point the previous site came to be known as Old Gargara (Ancient Greek: Παλαιγάργαρος). Both sites are located in the Ayvacık district of Çanakkale Province in Turkey.

== Mount Gargaron ==
Mount Gargaron has been identified with the mountain today called Koca Kaya (Turkish Great Rock), a western spur of Mount Ida with a maximum elevation of 780 m. The poet Epicharmus (fl. 540 - 450 BCE) refers to the mountain as "snowcapped" (ἀγάννιφα), and the Etymologicum Magnum (ca. 1150 CE) knew a tradition according to which the inhabitants of Old Gargara moved to their new site to escape the cold of their old home. In Homer's Iliad it is said to have had an altar to Zeus at its summit, and hence is a place the god frequently visits. In one passage Zeus is said to have come to Mount Gargaron from Mount Olympos to view the battle between the Trojans and the Acahaeans, about 50 km NE of here. In writers of the 1st and 2nd century AD such as Statius and Lucian Zeus is said to have abducted the Trojan prince Ganymede from Mount Gargaron while he was hunting in the nearby forests. Lucian also represents the Judgement of Paris as taking place on Mount Gargaron rather than in its more traditional location further to the east above Antandrus. The anonymous author of On Rivers thought that Gargara was Mount Ida's previous name, while the Latin poet Valerius Flaccus used it as a learned way of referring to Ida. The Etymologicum Magnum explains the name of Gargaron either as deriving from the verb γαργαρίζειν ('to gargle') on account of the springs thought to bubble up on the summit (an inference taken from Homer's reference to 'many-fountained Ida' in conjunction with Gargaron), or as deriving from γαργαρέων ('uvula') on account of the mountain's shape.

The poet Aratus of Soli wrote an epigram about his friend Diotimos, who used to teach the children of Gargara their letters up on Mount Gargaron:

αἰάζω Διότιμον, ὃς ἐν πέτρῃσι κάθηται
παισὶν Γαργαρέων βῆτα καὶ ἄλφα λέγων.

I bewail Diotimos, who would sit among the rocks
Teaching the children of the Gargarians their alpha and beta.

== History ==
=== Foundation ===
There is no indication in the relevant passages of the Iliad that Homer considered Mount Gargaron inhabited. This is partly confirmed by the fact that the earliest archaeological remains found at the site (fortification walls around the acropolis and the foundations of a temple) date no later than the 6th century BCE. In the 7th century BCE the poet Alcman said that the settlement was inhabited by Leleges, an Anatolian people, but this may simply be an inference from Homer's remark elsewhere in the Iliad that the whole southern coast of the Troad was inhabited by Leleges. Hecataeus of Miletus (ca. 550 - 476 BCE) and Hellanicus of Lesbos (ca. 490 - 405 BCE) say that Gargara was inhabited by Aeolian Greeks originally from nearby Assos and Myrsilos of Methymna (first half of the 3rd century BCE) that Assos was a foundation of Methymna, hence the Aeolian ethnicity of Assos and the secondary foundations of Gargara and Lamponeia. If Alcman was correct to indicate the existence of an Anatolian settlement named Gargara in the 7th century BCE, then this fact could be harmonized with the apparently contradictory story of Gargara instead being a Greek foundation by noting that many settlements in this region had a mixed Greco-Anatolian heritage in which the local Anatolian population became assimilated with the Greek newcomers. With respect to how the early settlement came to adopt the name of the mountain, John Cook, the archaeologist who identified the site of Old Gargara on Koca Kaya, remarked that: "What we can believe is that the people of Methymna across the strait pointed to this bold peak as the Homeric Γάργαρον ἄκρον and that the settlers there felt themselves entitled to appropriate the name".

=== Classical ===
In the 5th century BCE Gargara was a member of the Delian League and paid a tribute to Athens of between 4,500 and 4,600 drachmas as part of the Hellespontine district. It is currently thought that the Gargarians moved from the site at Koca Kaya down to the coast in the 4th century BCE, although this has not been confirmed by excavation. A long inscription found at Ilion indicates that by ca. 306 Gargara was a member of the koinon of Athena Ilias, a regional association of cities in the Troad which held an annual festival at Ilion. The inscription records a series of honorific decrees passed by the koinon which praise a prominent and wealthy citizen, Malousios of Gargara, for providing interest free loans to finance the annual festival.

=== Hellenistic ===
The local antiquarian writer Demetrius of Scepsis (ca. 205-130 BCE) relates that Gargara received an influx of settlers who were forcibly moved from their home in Mysia, Miletoupolis, by 'the kings' (presumably those of Bithynia) in the late 3rd or early 2nd century BCE. Miletoupolis was a semi-Greek settlement, and so Demetrius relates that as a result of this influx of immigrants there are hardly any Aeolians left in Gargara. This episode should perhaps be connected with the invasion of this region by Prusias II of Bithynia in 156 - 154 BCE. Elsewhere in the Hellenistic period, citizens of Gargara are found serving as proxenoi at Chios and as mercenaries at Athens, participating in a private association of resident foreigners on Rhodes, making dedications to Ptolemy III Euergetes and his family in Egypt, receiving honours at Ilion, and making dedications on Delos. In the 230s or 220s BCE Gargara was one of the places at which Theorodokoi of Delphi were received, and in the 120s BCE it is attested as a port at which customs dues was being paid soon after Attalus III had bequeathed the Asia to Rome in 133 BCE.

=== Roman ===
While Gargara continued to exist in the Roman period, we hear about it primarily in the context of Latin literature, since it became a by-word for agricultural prosperity in Latin poetry following Virgil's reference to it in the Georgics:

humida solstitia atque hiemes orate serenas,
agricolae; hiberno laetissima pulvere farra,
laetus ager: nullo tantum se Mysia cultu
iactat et ipsa suas mirantur Gargara messis.

Pray for wet summer, farmers, and for clear skies in winter
(since after winter dust most joyous is the corn and joyous the
fields); never else than after such seasons does Mysia take such
pride in its tillage, and Gargara itself marvel so at its harvests.

Gargara is likewise used as an expression of proverbial fertility in Ovid's Ars Amatoria, Seneca's tragedy The Phoenician Women, and as late as the 5th century CE in the odes of Sidonius Apollinaris. Macrobius in his Saturnalia (early 5th century CE) devoted a chapter to the question of what had given Virgil the idea of using Gargara this way in the first place, concluding that it was an inference firstly from Mount Ida's reputation for being well-watered in Homer, secondly from Mysia's general reputation for fertility, and thirdly from the use of γάργαρα (gargara) in Old Comedy to express an immense quantity of anything.

=== Byzantine ===
Gargara appears to have been continuously occupied until at least the 9th century, and perhaps as late as the 14th. It was a suffragan bishopric of the metropolis of Ephesus for which we know the names of three of its bishops: John (518), Theodorus (553), and Ephraim (878). In addition to possible middle Byzantine remains seen at Gargara by John Cook, other documents such as the Epistulae Dogmaticae of Patriarch Germanus I of Constantinople (715-730) and the Notitiae Episcopatuum also attest Gargara's continued existence throughout this period. Finally, four documents from the Monastery of Great Lavra on Mount Athos dating to 1284 and 1304 attest a Constantine of Gargara and his family. The latest period of occupation at the site may be represented by the nearby castles of Menteşe and Şahin Kale which Cook thought could be either Byzantine or Genoese.

== Bibliography ==
- A. Plassart, 'Inscriptions de Delphes: la liste de théorodoques' BCH 45 (1921) 1-85.
- J. M. Cook, The Troad: An Archaeological and Topographical Study (Oxford, 1973) 327–44.
- R. Stüpperich, 'Ein archaisches Kriegerrelief aus Gargara' in E. Schwertheim (ed.), Studien zum Antiken Kleinasien III, Asia Minor Studien 26 (Bonn, 1995) 127–38.
- A. Schulz, Die Stadtmauern von Neandreia in der Troas, Asia Minor Studien 38 (Bonn, 2000).
- S. Mitchell, 'Gargara' in M. H. Hansen and T. H. Nielsen (eds), An Inventory of Archaic and Classical Poleis (Oxford, 2004) no. 775.
- M. Cottier et al. (eds.), The Customs Law of Asia (Oxford, 2008).
- S. Radt, Strabons Geographika: mit Übersetzung und Kommentar, Vol. VII (Göttingen, 2008).
