= Edremit Gulf =

Coordinates: 39.4767°N 26.6931°E

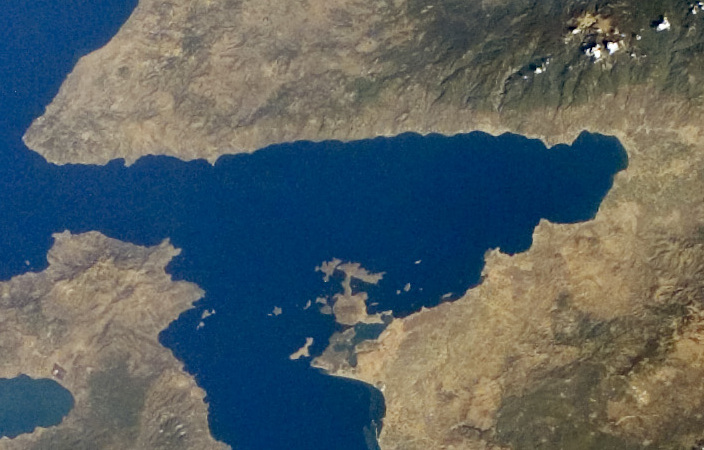
Satellite view (2005)

The Edremit gulf (Turkish: Edremit körfezi) is an Aegean gulf in Turkey's Balıkesir Province. It is named after Edremit, a district of Balıkesir Province which is situated close to the tip of the gulf. Biga Peninsula is to the north. The southern coast belongs to the ilçe of Ayvalık, while the western entrance is enclosed with the northern part of the Greek island of Lesbos.

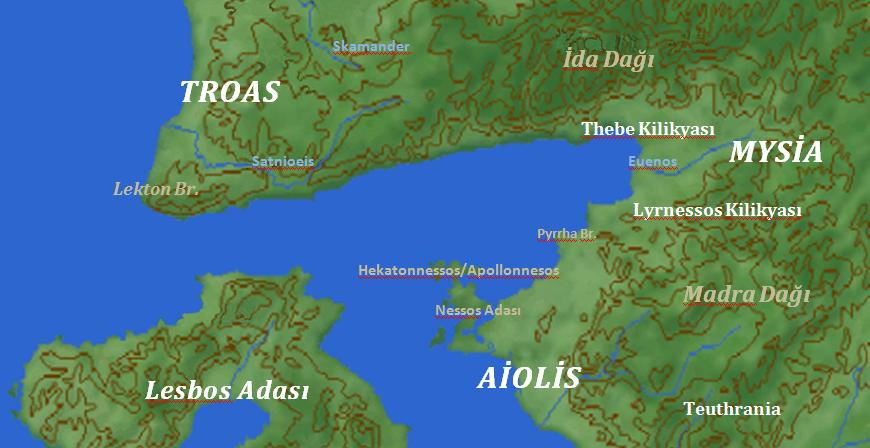
Historic settlements in the Edremit gulf

In ancient history there were many settlements lying close to the north coast of the gulf; Hamaxitus, Polymedium, Assos, Lamponeia, Antandrus and Adramyttion, were some of these.

Currently there are a number of ilçe centers or bigger towns around the gulf such as Behramkale, Küçükkuyu, Altınoluk, Akçay, Havran, Burhaniye, Armutova, Ayvalık and Cunda Island (from the north west). There are summer houses and holiday camps along the 70 kilometres (43 mi) long northern coast and the 40 kilometres (25 mi) long southern coast of the gulf.

The gulf is famous for European sprat, olive and olive oil production.
