= Akçay, Edremit =

Akçay
- Neighbourhood
- Location in Turkey Akçay (Marmara)
- Coordinates: 39°35′09″N 26°55′26″E
- Country: Turkey
- Province: Balıkesir
- District: Edremit
- Population (2022): 5,478
- Time zone: UTC+3 (TRT)

Akçay (in Turkish: White Creek) is a neighbourhood of the municipality and district of Edremit, Balıkesir Province, Turkey. Its population is 5,478 (2022). Before the 2013 reorganisation, it was a town (belde).

Akçay is located in the Edremit Bay at the coast of north-eastern Aegean Sea, across the Greek island Lesbos. It is 10 km west of Edremit on the highway D560 (E-87) to Altınoluk. With its long beach and clear sea, it is a highly popular summer resort for domestic tourists. Its population grows around tenfold in the summer season. The very cool groundwater running into the sea keeps the sea fresh all summer long.

Akçay has a mild climate in summer months.
