= Adramyttium =

Ancient city in north west Minor Asia

- Ἀδραμύττιον (Greek)
- Location within Turkey
- 39°29′56″N 26°56′9″E
- Type: Settlement
- Location: Ören, Burhaniye, Balıkesir Province, Turkey
- Region: Aeolis

Adramyttium (Note: Also known as Adramyttion, Adramytteion, Atramyttion, Adramyteum) (Greek: Ἀδραμύττιον Adramyttion, Ἀδραμύττειον Adramytteion, or Ἀτραμύττιον Atramyttion) was an ancient city and bishopric in Aeolis, in modern-day Turkey. It was originally located at the head of the Gulf of Adramyttium, in the Plain of Thebe Hypoplakia, in the locality now known as Ören, 4 kilometres west of the modern town of Burhaniye, but later moved 13 kilometres northeast to its current location and became known as Edremit.

== History ==
=== Iron Age ===
The site of Adramyttium was originally settled by Leleges, the indigenous inhabitants of the Aegean littoral, and people from the neighbouring region of Mysia. The area was later settled by Lydians, Cimmerians, and Aeolian Greeks, who gave their name to the region of Aeolis. The area became part of the peraia (mainland territory) of the city-state of Mytilene in the 8th century BC, and the city of Adramyttium was founded in the 6th century BC. According to Aristotle, Adramyttium was founded by, and named after, Adramytos, the son of King Alyattes of Lydia. Prior to his ascension to the throne, Croesus, Alyattes' successor, was governor of a district centred on Adramyttium.

=== Classical Age ===
Following the fall of the kingdom of Lydia in 546 BC Adramyttium came under the rule of the Persian Empire and was administered as part of the satrapy (province) of Hellespontine Phrygia from the early 5th century BC onward. In 422 BC, Pharnaces, the satrap of Hellespontine Phrygia, offered asylum to exiles from the island of Delos, who settled in the city. Thereafter Adramyttium was considered a Greek city. Arsaces, a general subordinate to Tissaphernes, the satrap of Lydia and Caria, massacred a number of the Delian exiles. The Delians returned to Delos in 421/420 BC when the Athenians permitted them to do so.

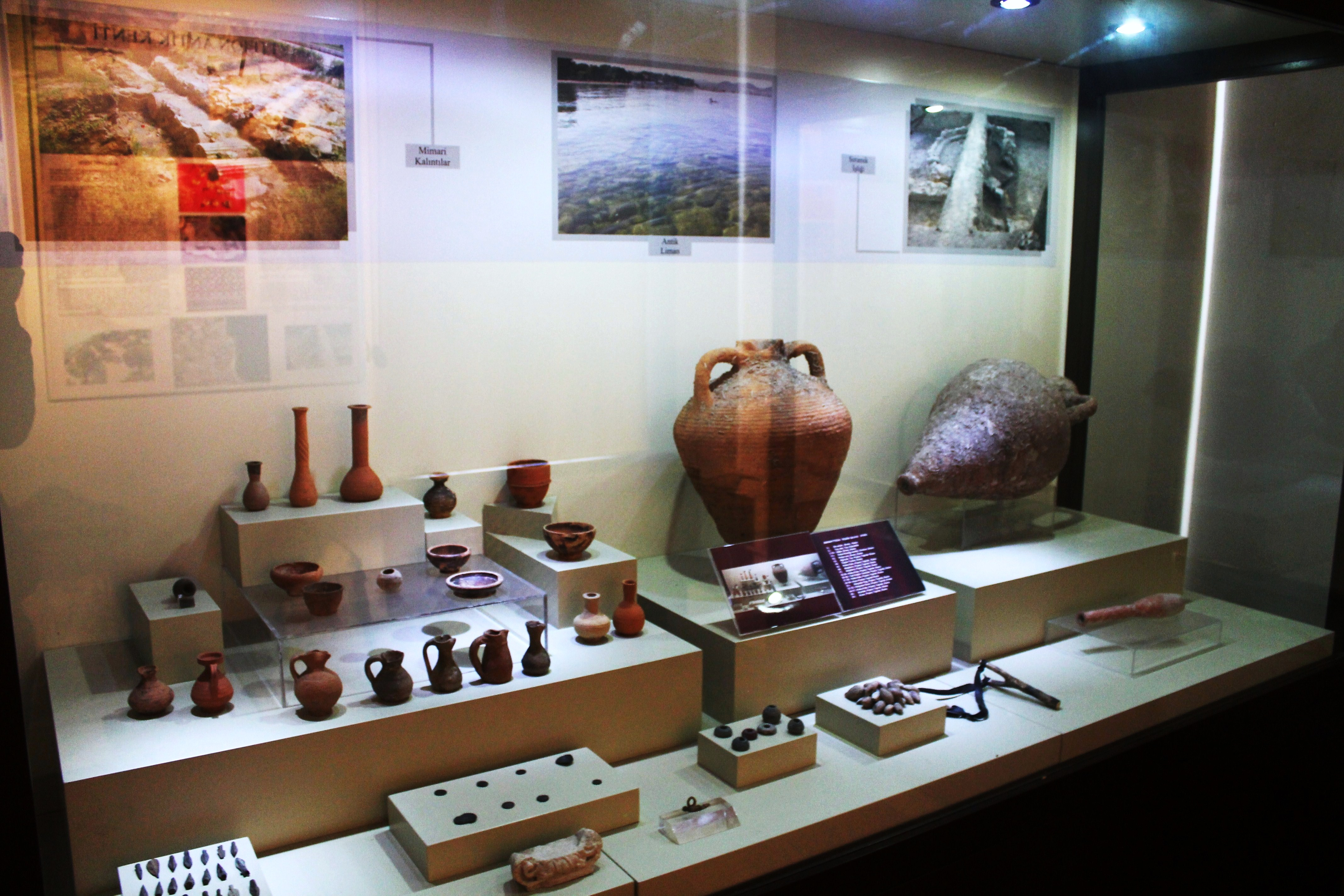
Archaeological finds from Adramyttium at the Kuva-yi Milliye Museum, Balikesir

Following the end of the Peloponnesian War in 404 BC, Adramyttium came again under the control of Mytilene. The Ten Thousand, a Greek mercenary force, travelled through Adramyttium during their march along the coast. Mytilene retained control of Adramyttium until 386 BC, after which the city formed again part of the Persian Empire by the terms of the Peace of Antalcidas. During the Great Satraps' Revolt, Ariobarzanes, satrap of Hellespontine Phygia, joined the revolt against Artaxerxes II in 367 BC. Autophradates, satrap of Lydia, and Mausolus, satrap of Caria, besieged Ariobarzanes at Adramyttium in 366 BC. However, the siege of Adramyttium was abandoned following the arrival of Agesilaus II, King of Sparta, in 365 BC.

=== Hellenistic period ===
Following his victory at the Battle of the Granicus in 334 BC, Adramyttium came under the control of Alexander the Great. After Alexander's death in 323 BC, his empire was divided among the Diadochi at the Partition of Babylon, and Leonnatus was appointed satrap of Hellespontine Phrygia. At the Partition of Triparadisus in 321 BC, Arrhidaeus succeeded Leonnatus as satrap of Hellespontine Phrygia. In 319 BC, Adramyttium and Hellespontine Phrygia were seized by Antigonus I Monophthalmus, satrap of Greater Phrygia. Adramyttium and Hellespontine Phrygia remained under the control of Antigonus until the Fourth War of the Diadochi; the city was taken by force by Prepelaus, a general of Lysimachus, Basileus of Thrace, in 302 BC. Adramyttium and Lysimachus' other Anatolian territories were annexed to the Seleucid Empire after Lysimachus' defeat at the Battle of Corupedium in 281 BC. An artificial port was constructed at Adramyttium in the early third century BC, which subsequently allowed the city to overshadow the neighbouring port of Cisthene.

Adramyttium came under the control of the Attalid dynasty of Pergamon during the rule of Eumenes I, a nominal vassal of the Seleucid Empire, in the mid-third century BC. The alliance between Attalus I, Eumenes's successor, and Rhodes during the Cretan War led Philip V, King of Macedonia, to invade Attalid Pergamon and pillage the countryside surrounding Adramyttium in 201 BC. As an ally of Rome, Pergamon fought in the Roman–Seleucid War against the Seleucid Empire. In 190 BC, Antiochus III plundered the countryside surrounding Adramyttium, but the appearance of a Roman–Pergamene fleet prevented him from taking the city. In the second century BC, cistophori, the coinage of Attalid Pergamon, were minted at Adramyttium. Attalus III, the last king of Pergamon, bestowed his kingdom to the Romans in his will, and thus, in 133 BC, Adramyttium came under Roman control. The city became part of the province of Asia.

=== Roman period ===
Manius Aquillius, governor of the province of Asia from 129 to 126 BC, rebuilt the road that connected Adramyttium and Smyrna. In the 1st century BC, a famous school of oratory was located in Adramyttium. Adramyttium was the centre of a conventus iuridicus, and its jurisdiction included the Troad and the western half of Mysia. Adramyttium was also the centre of a conventus civium Romanorum in the second or early first century BC.

During the First Mithridatic War, Diodorus, a strategos and supporter of Mithridates VI, King of Pontus, had the members of the city council killed and granted control of the city to Mithridates. Following the completion of the conquest of the province of Asia in 88 BC, Mithridates ordered the execution of all Roman settlers. At Adramyttium, the Romans were driven into the sea, where they were slaughtered. At the conclusion of the war, the province of Asia returned to Roman control and Xenocles of Adramyttium, a prominent orator, was sent to Rome to defend the actions of the city during the war. Adramyttium, however, was deprived of its autonomy, and was henceforth obligated to pay regular taxes to Rome.

According to the Acts of the Apostles, whilst en route to Rome, St. Paul departed Caesarea Maritima on a ship from the city of Adramyttium which took him to Myra in Lycia.

Adramyttium later also became the seat of a portorium. Adramyttium was damaged by an earthquake during the reign of Emperor Trajan (r. 98–117), who subsequently rebuilt the city. Upon the death of Emperor Theodosius I in 395, and subsequent division of the Roman Empire into eastern and western halves, Adramyttium became part of the Eastern Roman Empire.

A large, luxurious and well-preserved Roman house has recently been discovered here dating from the second to fifth centuries AD. Its northern hall alone had over 15 rooms decorated with elaborate mosaic floors and rich frescoes.

=== Medieval period ===
The administrative reforms of the 7th century led Adramyttium to be administered as part of the Thracesian Theme. In early 715, soldiers of the theme of Opsikion mutinied and travelled to Adramyttium where they proclaimed Theodosius, a praktor (tax-collector), as emperor. Theodosius did not wish to become emperor and fled to the mountains, but was found and forced to become emperor at sword-point. Adramyttium came under the administration of the theme of Samos in the ninth century and became the seat of a tourmarches of that theme. A tourma of the hinterland of Adramyttium remained part of the Thracesian Theme, but was also based at Adramyttium.

Adramyttium was sacked by Tzachas, a Turkish ruler, in c. 1090 and subsequently rebuilt and repopulated by Eumathios Philokales in 1109. According to Anna Komnene:

This (Adramyttium) was formerly a very populous town: but when Tzachas was laying waste the country round Smyrna, he laid it in ruins and rased it to the ground. On observing the complete disappearance of this town which looked as if man had never dwelt in it, Eumathius forthwith rebuilt it and restored it to its former appearance and recalled the inhabitants from all sides, at least such of the original ones as had escaped, and sent for many from other parts and settled them in the town, and thus gave it back its former appearance.

During this period, Adramyttium was used as a base to defend against Italian and Turkish attacks. Upon discovering that Malik Shah, Sultan of Rum, planned to invade in early 1112, Emperor Alexios I Komnenos sent an army to Adramyttium ahead of him as he travelled to the Chersonese peninsula. During the reign of Emperor Manuel I Komnenos (r. 1143–1180), Adramyttion formed part of the new theme of Neokastra. French crusaders passed through Adramyttium on their march south to Ephesus during the Second Crusade. After the ascension of Emperor Andronikos I Komnenos in 1183, Andronikos Lapardas revolted against the emperor and travelled to Bithynia to join the rebels, but was seized at Adramyttium and imprisoned. The megas doux Michael Stryphnos levied a fine on the Genoese merchant Cafforio, who subsequently raided the cities of the Aegean Sea and sacked Adramyttium in 1197.

Following the Fall of Constantinople to the Fourth Crusade in 1204 and the formation of the Latin Empire, Emperor Baldwin granted the land between Abydos on the Hellespont to Adramyttium to his brother Henry of Flanders, who went on to capture Adramyttium in the winter of 1204/1205. The Byzantine magnate Theodore Mangaphas attempted to seize the city but was defeated by Henry of Flanders at the Battle of Adramyttium on 19 March 1205. Adramyttium was recovered by the Empire of Nicaea, a successor state of the Byzantine Empire, later that year. Nicaea maintained control of the city until 1211. Henry of Flanders regained Adramyttium in October 1211 after his victory over the Nicaean emperor Theodore I Laskaris at the Battle of the Rhyndacus. Theodore I subsequently ceded Adramyttium to the Latin Empire in the Treaty of Nymphaeum. In 1224, Latin rule in Anatolia collapsed and Adramyttium was recaptured by the Empire of Nicaea.

The Treaty of Nymphaeum of 1261 granted the Republic of Genoa trading privileges, such as marketplaces, at Adramyttium, among other Aegean cities. In 1268, the Venetians were granted a concession in Adramyttium. In early 1284, a synod was held at Adramyttium by Emperor Andronikos II Palaiologos, accompanied by his aunt Theodora and his cousins Anna Palaiologina Kantakouzene and Theodora Raoulaina, with the intention of reconciling with the "Arsenites", supporters of Arsenios Autoreianos, the deposed Ecumenical Patriarch of Constantinople. Arsenites who were poorly treated by Andronikos' father Michael VIII Palaiologos, who had deposed Arsenios, were declared martyrs; in exchange, the Arsenites temporarily recognized the appointment of Gregory II as Patriarch of Constantinople, as legitimate. During the synod, the two factions agreed to settle their dispute by setting fire to separate documents containing their arguments; the undamaged document was said to contain the truth, but both documents were destroyed in the fire.

Following victory over the Byzantines at the Battle of Bapheus in July 1302, the founder of the Ottoman dynasty, Osman I, raided the countryside surrounding Adramyttium. The threat of Turkish attacks led the Genoese of Phocaea to seize the Venetian concession in Adramyttium in 1304. The city fell to the Karasid Turks before 1334. The Karasid beylik, including Adramyttium, was annexed by the Ottoman beylik in the mid-fourteenth century.

== Ecclesiastical history ==
In 325 AD, the diocese of Adramyttium was made a suffragan of the Archdiocese of Ephesus. Helladius, Bishop of Adramyttium, attended the Council of Ephesus in 431, and Aurelius attended the Synod of Constantinople in 448. Flavianus was present at the Second Council of Ephesus in 449 and the Council of Chalcedon in 451. Julian is addressed in a work by Hypatius, Archbishop of Ephesus, in c. 531–540 or c. 550. Theodore attended the Third Council of Constantinople in 680, and Basilius was present at the Second Council of Nicaea in 787. Michael attended the Council of Constantinople of 869.

Sergius was Bishop of Adramyttium at the beginning of the 11th century, and Bishop George was active later during the 11th century. Constantine was bishop sometime in the 11th–12th centuries. John was bishop in the second half of the 12th century, and Gregory was bishop in 1167. George was present at the Synod of Ephesus in 1230, and Athanasius was bishop later in the 13th century. The diocese of Adramyttium became defunct in the 15th century, but was united with the former Archdiocese of Pergamon to form the Archdiocese of Pergamon and Adramyttium on 19 February 1922. Following the Greco-Turkish population exchange in 1923, the see is titular only.

During the second period of Latin occupation, between 1211 and 1224, a Latin bishop of Adramyttium was appointed and the diocese of Adramyttium was made a suffragan of the Latin archdiocese of Cyzicus. Since the mid-15th century, it is a titular bishopric of the Roman Catholic Church.

== Location ==
Debate exists as to when Adramyttium moved to its current site at the modern city of Edremit. According to Wilhelm Tomaschek, Adramyttium moved to the site of modern Edremit under Trajan, however, it has been argued that there was no cause for this during Trajan's rule as piracy, the sole cause for such a move, was negligible. Kiepert argued that this move took place in 1109, however, scholars note that it is not stated in contemporary sources that the city was rebuilt inland. It has also been argued that the relocation of Adramyttium took place after its destruction by Genoese pirates in 1197.

== Notable people ==
- Andriscus (r. 149–148 BC), King of Macedonia
- Diodorus of Adramyttium (1st century BC), strategos and philosopher
- Xenocles of Adramyttium, an orator
- Atyanas (fl. 72–62 BC), boxer
- Theodosius III (fl. 715–717), Byzantine Emperor
- George Mouzalon (c. 1220–1258), megas domestikos of the Empire of Nicaea
- George Galesiotes (c. 1275/1280−1357), patriarchal official and writer
- Demetrius of Adramyttium (Ancient Greek: Δημήτριος Ἀδραμυττηνὸς), a Greek grammarian who was called Ixion (Ancient Greek: Ἰξίων)

== See also ==
- List of ancient Greek cities
- Ancient sites of Balıkesir

== Bibliography ==
- Almagor, Eran (2012). "Adramyttion". Encyclopedia of Ancient History. doi:10.1002/9781444338386.wbeah04006. ISBN 978-1-4443-3838-6.
- Brand, Charles M. (1991). "Mankaphas, Theodore". In Kazhdan, Alexander (ed.). The Oxford Dictionary of Byzantium. Oxford and New York: Oxford University Press. pp. 1286–1287. ISBN 0-19-504652-8.
- Brand, Charles M. (1991). "Henry of Hainault". In Kazhdan, Alexander (ed.). The Oxford Dictionary of Byzantium. Oxford and New York: Oxford University Press. p. 914. ISBN 0-19-504652-8.
- Çoruhlu, Tulin (2012). "Findings Related to Olive at Excavations of (the Ancient City of Adramytteion) Ören". Environment and Ecology in the Mediterranean Region. Cambridge Scholars Publishing. ISBN 9781443838030.
- Constantakopoulou, Christy (2010). The Dance of the Islands: Insularity, Networks, the Athenian Empire, and the Aegean World. Oxford University Press. ISBN 9780191615450.
- Culerrier, Pascal (1987). "Les évêchés suffragants d'Éphèse aux 5e-13e siècles". Revue des Études Byzantines (in French). 45: 139–164. doi:10.3406/rebyz.1987.2207.
- Foss, Clive F. W. (1991). "Adramyttion". In Kazhdan, Alexander (ed.). The Oxford Dictionary of Byzantium. Oxford and New York: Oxford University Press. ISBN 0-19-504652-8.
- Foster, Edith; Lateiner, Donald (2012). Thucydides and Herodotus. Oxford University Press. ISBN 978-0-19-959326-2.
- Haldon, John (1999). Warfare, State and Society in the Byzantine World, 565–1204. London: UCL Press. ISBN 1-85728-495-X.
- Hansen, Mogens Herman; Nielsen, Thomas Heine (2004). An Inventory of Archaic and Classical Poleis. Oxford University Press. ISBN 978-0-19-814099-3.
- Hendy, Michael F. (2008). Studies in the Byzantine Monetary Economy C.300-1450. Cambridge University Press. ISBN 9780521088527.
- Kazhdan, Aleksandr Petrovich; Wharton, Annabel Jane (1985). Change in Byzantine Culture in the Eleventh and Twelfth Centuries. University of California Press. ISBN 978-0-520-05129-4.
- Kazhdan, Alexander (1991). "Praktor". In Kazhdan, Alexander (ed.). The Oxford Dictionary of Byzantium. Oxford and New York: Oxford University Press. pp. 1711–1712. ISBN 0-19-504652-8.
- Kazhdan, Alexander (1991). "Nymphaion, Treaty of". In Kazhdan, Alexander (ed.). The Oxford Dictionary of Byzantium. Oxford and New York: Oxford University Press. p. 1506. ISBN 0-19-504652-8.
- Kazhdan, Alexander (1991). "Ordeal". In Kazhdan, Alexander (ed.). The Oxford Dictionary of Byzantium. Oxford and New York: Oxford University Press. p. 1531. ISBN 0-19-504652-8.
- Kiminas, Demetrius (2011). The Ecumenical Patriarchate: A History of Its Metropolitanates with Annotated Hierarch Catalogs. Wildside Press LLC. ISBN 978-1-4344-5876-6.
- Leaf, Walter (1923). Strabo on the Troad: Book XIII, Chapter I. Cambridge University Press.
- Lendering, Jona (2005). "Maussolus". Livius.
- Magie, Davi (2015). Roman Rule in Asia Minor, Volume 1: To the End of the Third Century After Christ. Princeton University Press. ISBN 978-1-4008-4979-6.
- Magie, David (2017). Roman Rule in Asia Minor, Volume 2: To the End of the Third Century After Christ. Princeton University Press. ISBN 978-1-4008-8774-3.
- Mills, Watson E.; Bullard, Roger Aubrey (1990). Mercer Dictionary of the Bible. Mercer University Press. ISBN 978-0-86554-373-7.
- Nesbitt, John; Oikonomides, Nicolas, eds. (1996). Catalogue of Byzantine Seals at Dumbarton Oaks and in the Fogg Museum of Art, Volume 3: West, Northwest, and Central Asia Minor and the Orient. Vol. 3. Washington, DC: Dumbarton Oaks Research Library and Collection. ISBN 0-88402-250-1.
- Norwich, John Julius (1988). Byzantium: The Early Centuries. Viking Press.
- Parke, H.W. (1984). "Croesus and Delphi". Greek, Roman and Byzantine Studies. 25 (3).
- Pétridès, S. (1912). Dictionnaire d'Histoire et de Géographie Ecclésiastiques, ed. R. Aubert & E. Van Cauwenberch, vol. 1 (in French).
- Picón, Carlos A.; Hemingway, Seán (2016). Pergamon and the Hellenistic Kingdoms of the Ancient World. Metropolitan Museum of Art. ISBN 978-1-58839-587-0.
- Roberts, John (2007). "Leonnatus". Oxford Dictionary of the Classical World. doi:10.1093/acref/9780192801463.001.0001. ISBN 9780192801463.
- Roisman, Joseph (2012). Alexander's Veterans and the Early Wars of the Successors. University of Texas Press. ISBN 978-0-292-73596-5.
- Tritle, Lawrence A. (2013). The Greek World in the Fourth Century: From the Fall of the Athenian Empire to the Successors of Alexander. Routledge. ISBN 978-1-134-52467-9.
- Van Tricht, Filip (2011). The Latin Renovatio of Byzantium: The Empire of Constantinople (1204–1228). Leiden: Brill. ISBN 978-90-04-20323-5.
- Venning, T.; Harris, J. (2006). Chronology of the Byzantine Empire. Springer. ISBN 978-0-230-50586-5.
- Will, Édouard (1984). "The Formation of the Hellenistic Kingdoms". In Walbank, F. W.; Astin, A. E.; Frederiksen, M. W.; Ogilvie, R. M. (eds.). The Cambridge Ancient History, Volume VII, Part 1: The Hellenistic World. Cambridge: Cambridge University Press. ISBN 978-0-5212-3445-0.
- Zachariadou, Elizabeth A. (1991). "Karasi". In Kazhdan, Alexander (ed.). The Oxford Dictionary of Byzantium. Oxford and New York: Oxford University Press. p. 1107. ISBN 0-19-504652-8.
