= Havran, Balıkesir =

Havran
- District and municipality
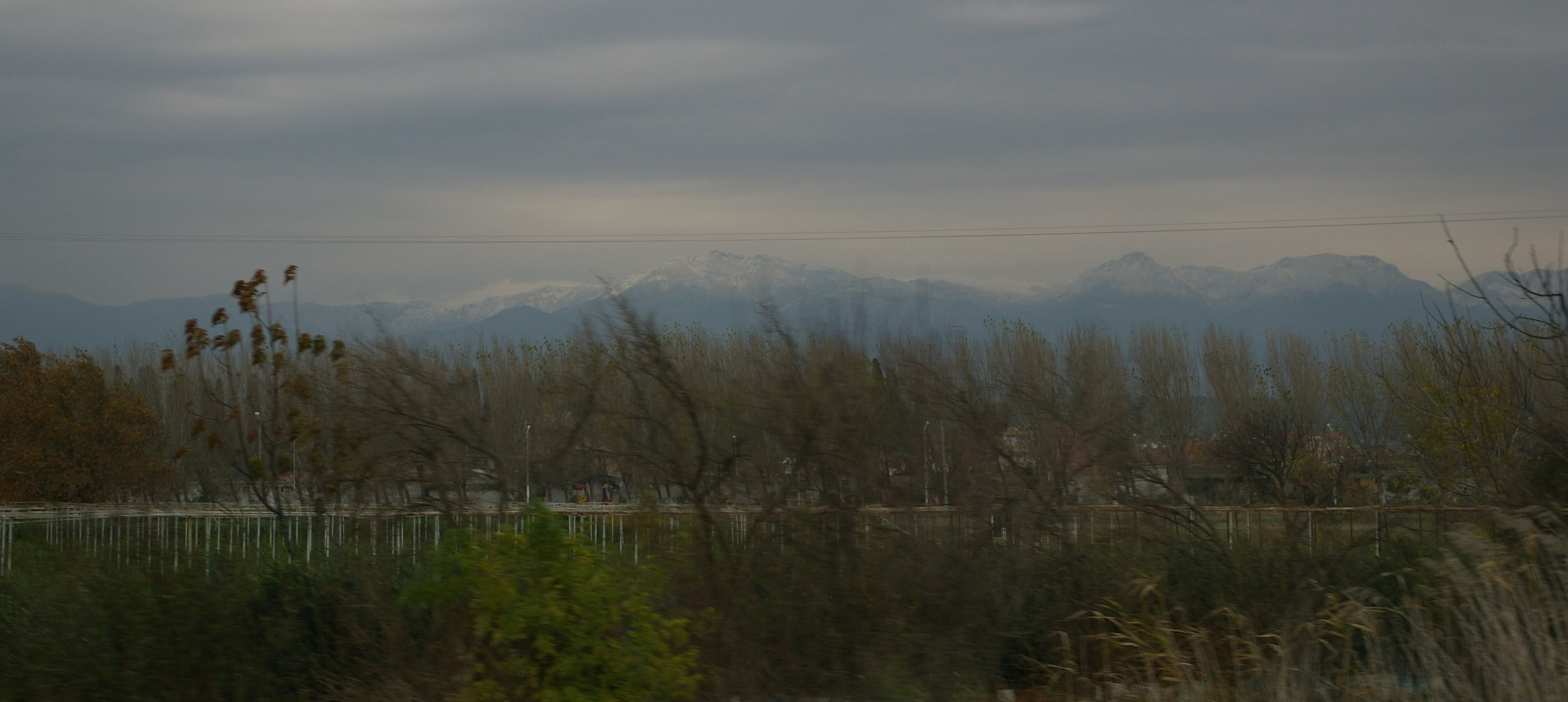
- Kaz Mountains, from Havran

- Map showing Havran District in Balıkesir Province

- Location within Turkey Location within Marmara
- Coordinates: 39°33′30″N 27°05′54″E
- Country: Turkey
- Province: Balıkesir

Government
  - Mayor: Emin Ersoy (AKP)
- Area: 565 km^{2} (218 sq mi)
- Elevation: 44 m (144 ft)
- Population (2022): 28,058
  - Density: 49.7/km^{2} (129/sq mi)
- Time zone: UTC+3 (TRT)
- Postal code: 10560
- Area code: 0266
- Website: www.havran.bel.tr

Havran is a municipality and district of Balıkesir Province, Turkey. Its area is 565 km^{2}, and its population is 28,058 (2022). The town lies at an elevation of 44 m (144 ft).

The district has traditionally produced cheese and a fruit drink called şerbet.

Until the 1920 the population was mix of Turks, Greeks, and Tatar (refugees) with small numbers of Jews and Armenians.

== Composition ==
There are 34 neighbourhoods in Havran District:

- Büyükdere
- Büyükşapçı
- Çakırdere
- Çakmak
- Çamdibi
- Camikebir
- Çiğitzade
- Dereören
- Ebubekir
- Eğmir
- Eseler
- Fazlıca
- Halılar
- Hallaçlar
- Hamambaşı
- Hüseyinbeşeler
- İnönü
- Kalabak
- Karalar
- Karaoğlanlar
- Kobaklar
- Kocadağ
- Kocaseyit
- Köylüce
- Küçükdere
- Küçükşapçı
- Mescit
- Sarnıçköy
- Tarlabaşı
- Taşarası
- Tekke
- Temaşalık
- Tepeoba
- Yeni
