= Mount Ida (Turkey) =

Mountain in Turkey with legendary mention in the poems of Homer

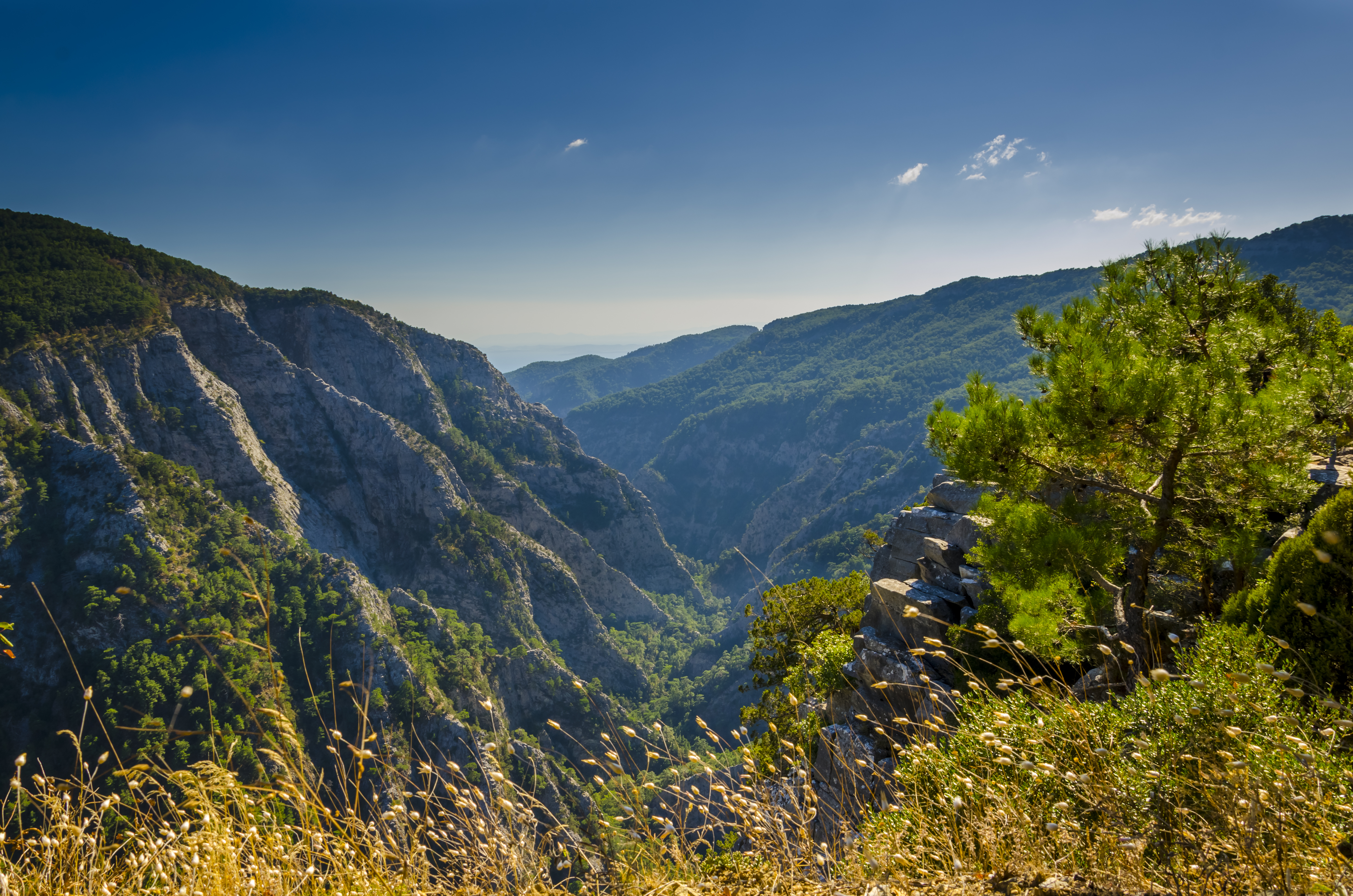
- Şahinderesi Canyon and Mount Ida

Highest point
- Elevation: 5,820 ft (1,770 m)
- Prominence: At Karataş peak (ancient Gargarus)
- Coordinates: 39°42′N 26°50′E

Naming
- Native name: Kazdağı (Turkish)

Geography
- Location within Turkey
- Location: Çanakkale Province and Balıkesir Province

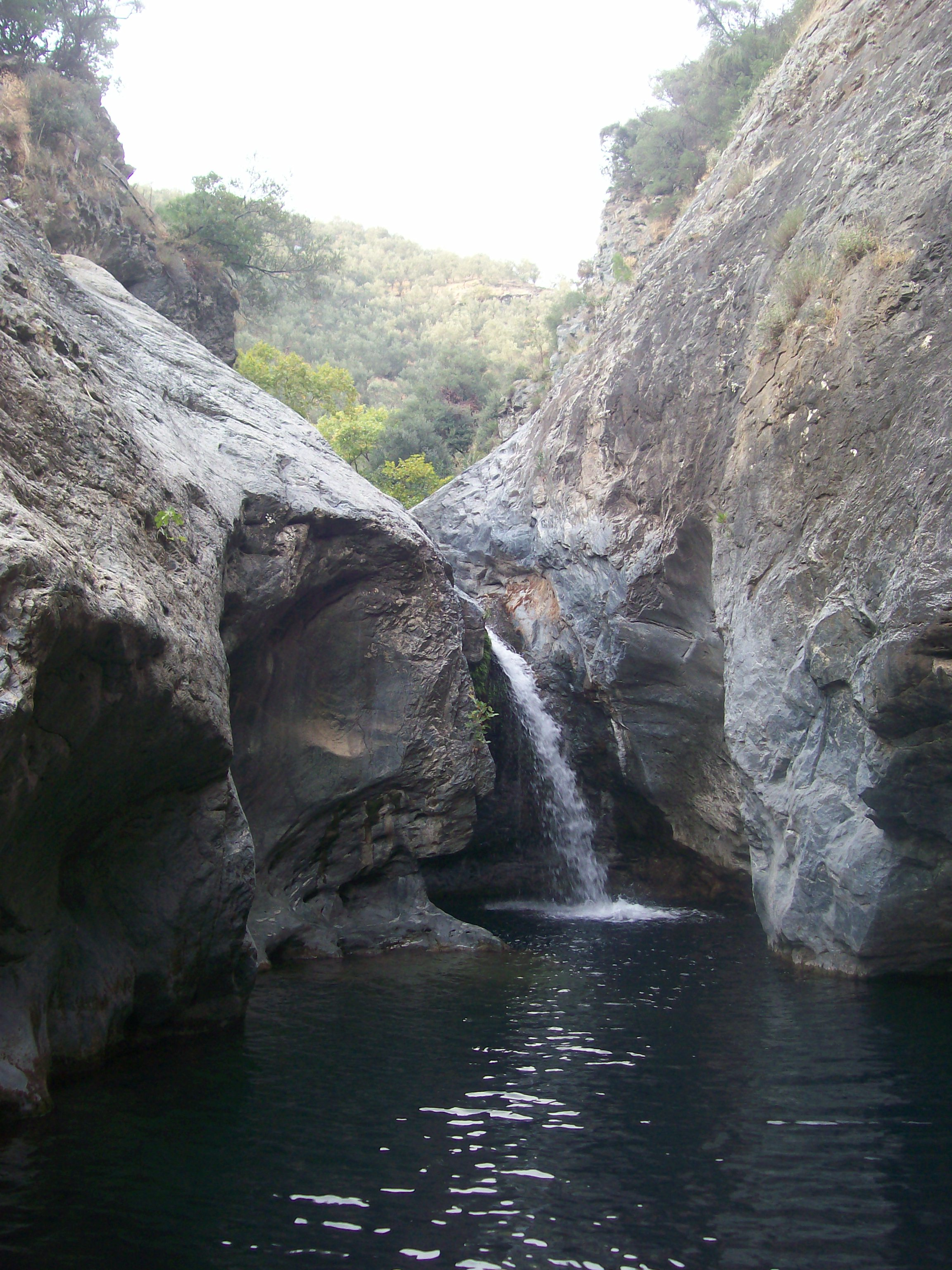
The Mıhlı waterfall is on the border between Balıkesir and Çanakkale in Mt. Ida

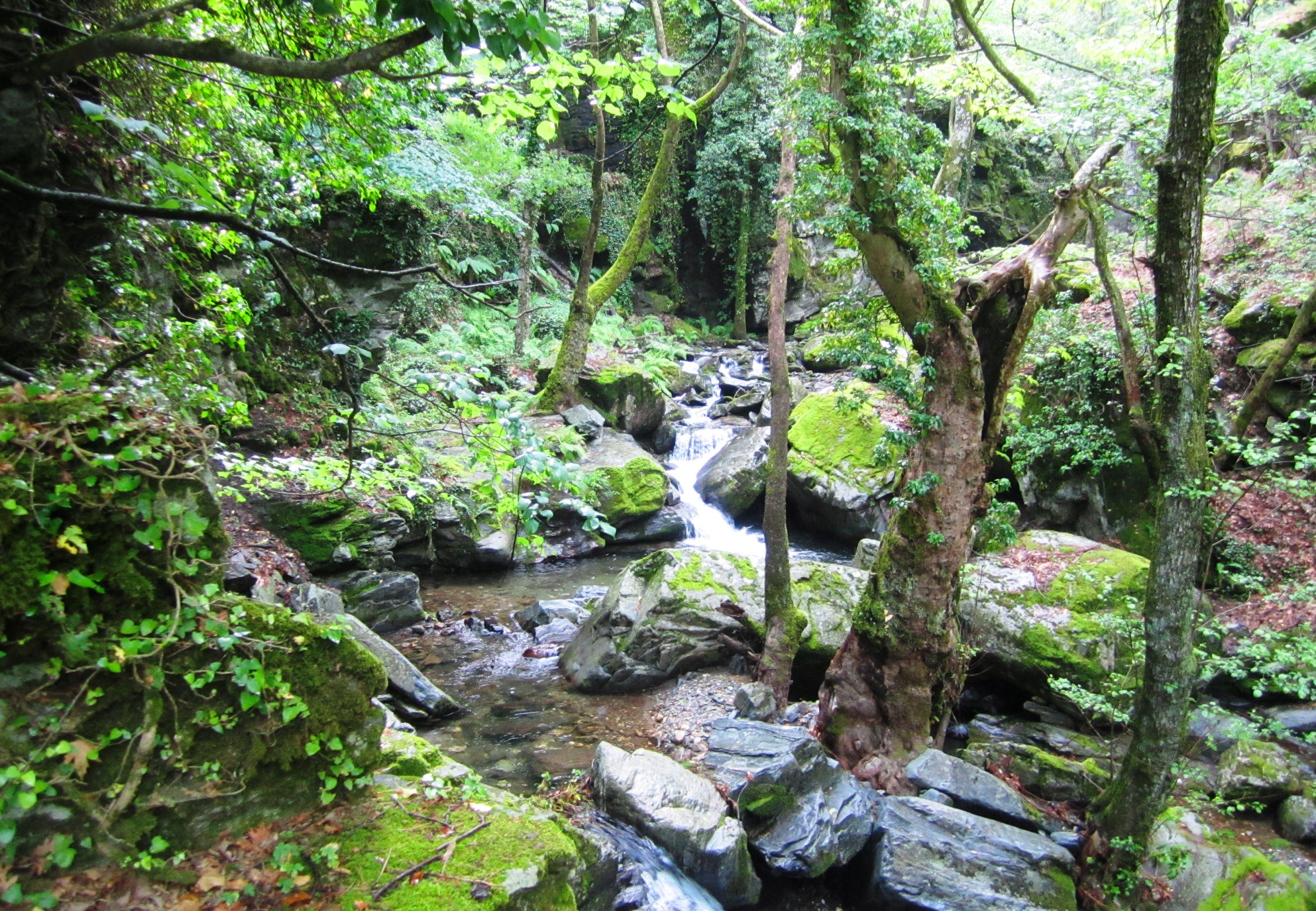
Mount Ida

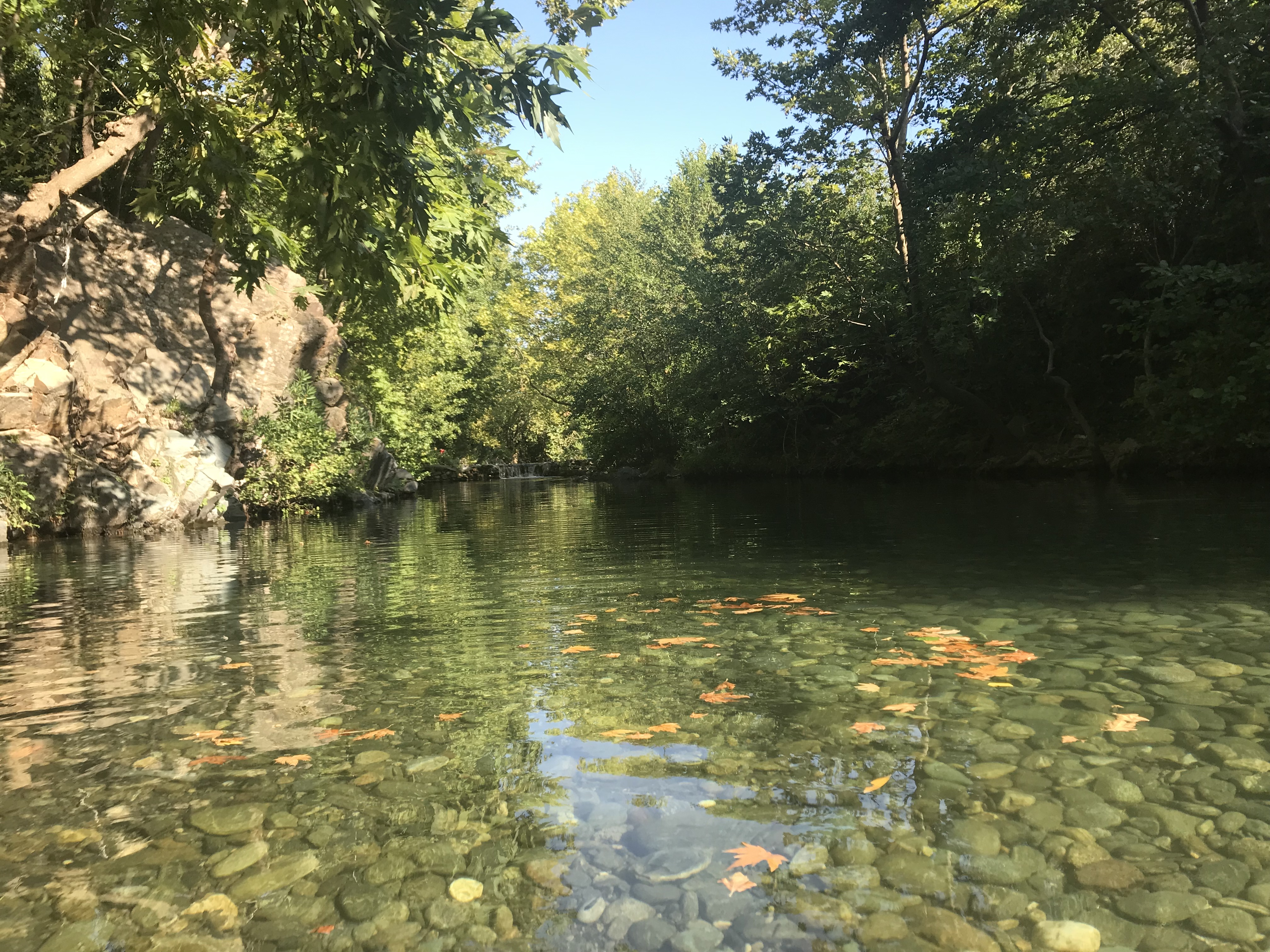
Mount Ida National Park

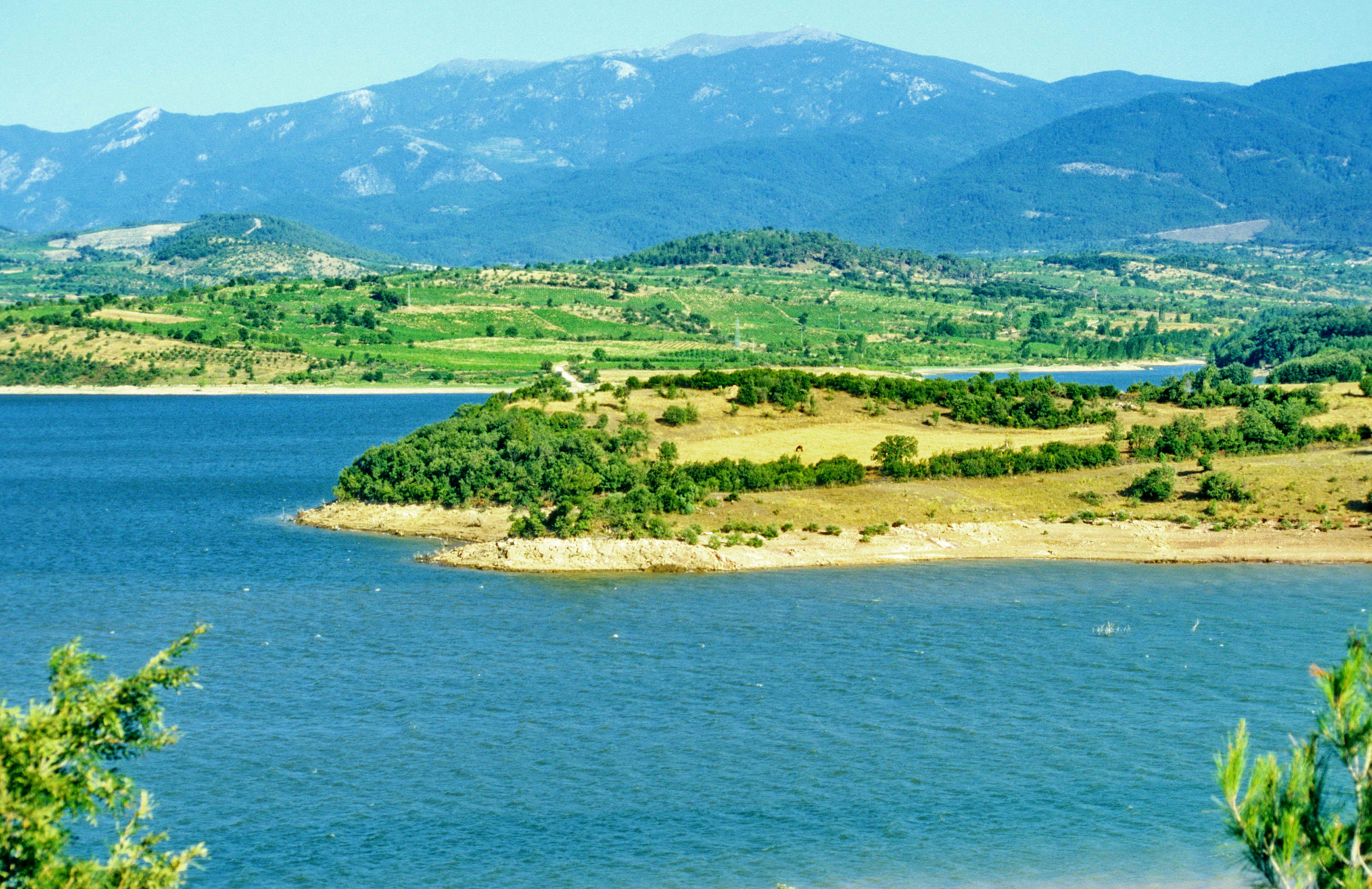
View of Mount Ida

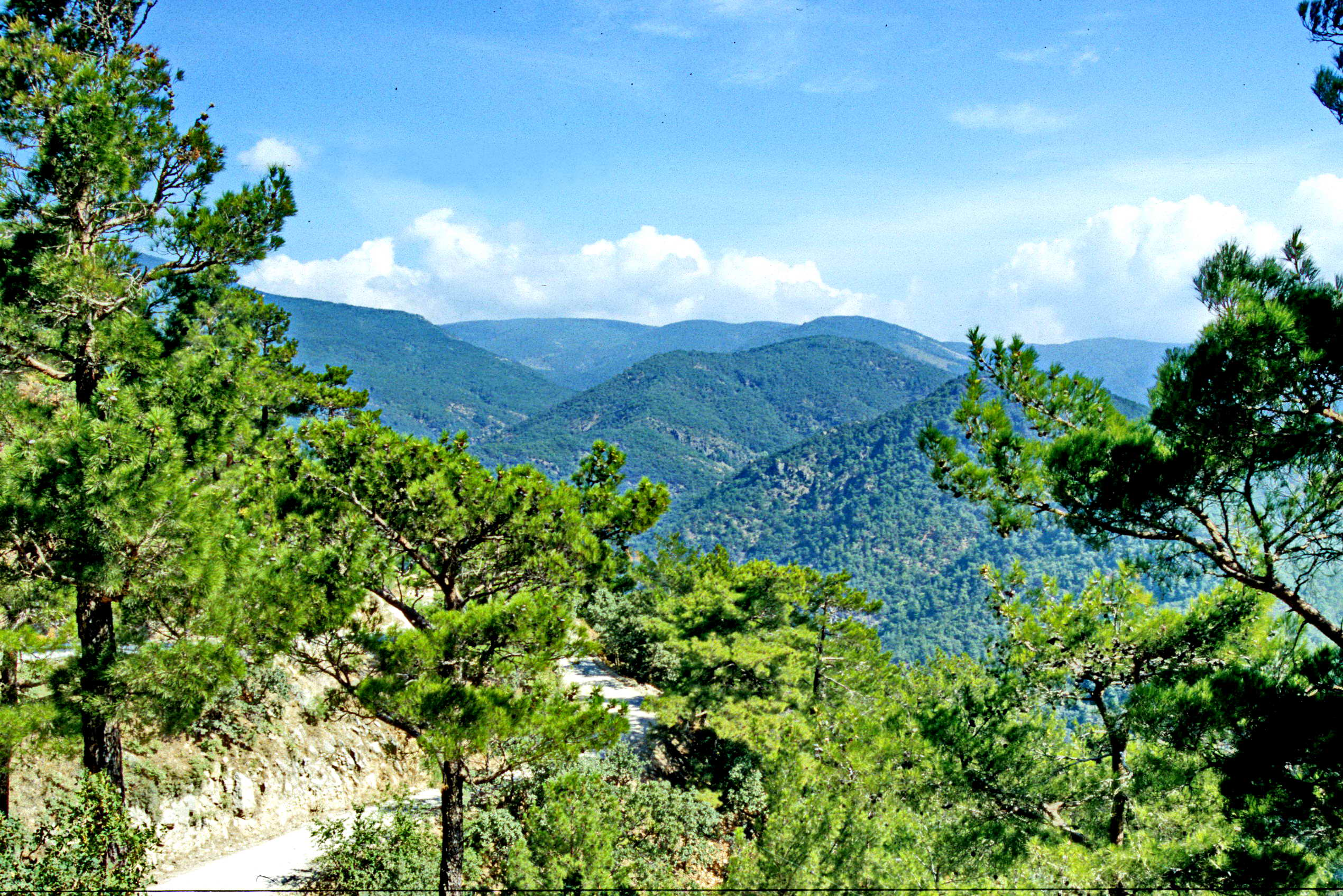
Mount Ida National Park

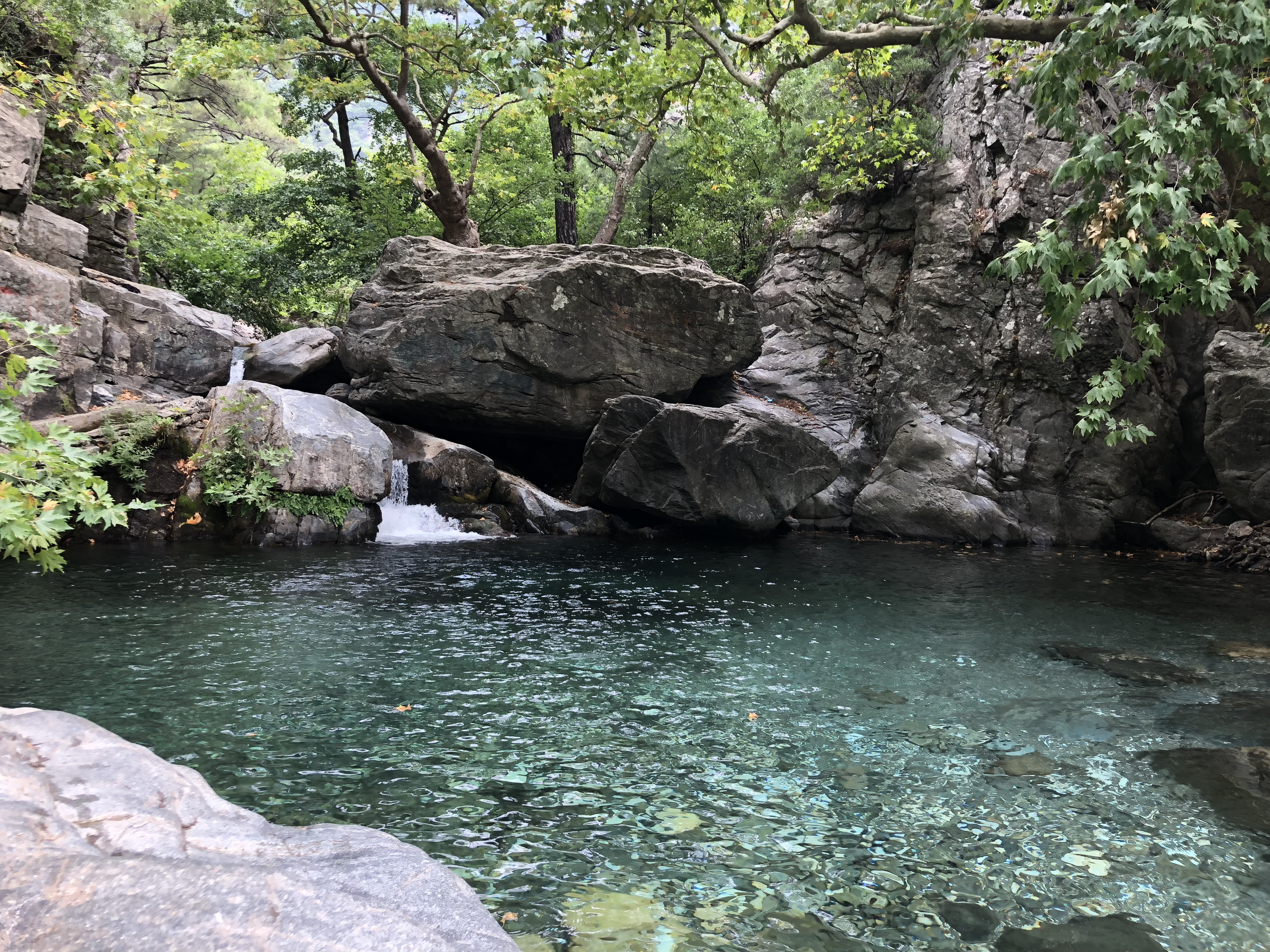
Mount Ida National Park

Mount Ida (Turkish: Kazdağı, pronounced [kazdaɯ], meaning "Goose Mountain", Kaz Dağları, or Karataş Tepesi, Greek: Ίδα) is a mountain in northwestern Turkey, some 20 mi (32 km) southeast of the ruins of Troy, along the north coast of the Edremit Gulf. It is between Balıkesir Province and Çanakkale Province.

== Geography ==
Mount Ida is a lightly populated upland massif of about 700 km^{2} located to the north of Edremit. A number of small villages in the region are connected by paths. Drainage is mainly to the south, into the Edremit Gulf, also known as Edremit Bay, where the coast is rugged and is known as "the Olive Riviera." However, the Karamenderes River (the ancient Scamander) flows from the other side of Mount Ida to the west. Its valley under Kaz Dağları has been called "the Vale of Troy" by English speakers. Currently a modest 2.4 km^{2} of Mount Ida are protected by Kaz Dağı National Park, created in 1993.

The summit is windswept and bare with a relatively low tree line due to exposure, but the slopes of this mountain, at the edge of mild Mediterranean and colder central Anatolian climate zones, hold a wealth of endemic flora, marooned here after the Ice Age. The climate at lower altitudes has become increasingly hot and dry in the deforested landscape. The dry period lasts from May to October. Rainfall averages between 631 and 733 mm per year. The mean annual temperature is 15.7 degrees Celsius, with diurnal temperatures as high as 43.7 degrees Celsius in Edremit. The forests on the upper slopes consist mainly of Trojan fir (Abies nordmanniana subsp. equi-trojani; considered by some botanists to be a distinct species Abies equi-trojani). Deer, wild boar and jackal are common at the area. Wolves, lynx, brown bears and big cats once roamed there, but now disappeared from the mountains due to overhunting.

== Legend ==
=== Cultic significance ===
==== Cybele ====
In ancient times of the Greeks, the mountain was dedicated to the worship of Cybele. The Romans gave this goddess the epithet Magna Mater ("Great Mother"), or Magna Mater deorum Idaea ("great Idaean mother of the gods").

==== Sibylline books ====
The oldest collection of Sibylline utterances, the Sibylline Books, appears to have been made about the time of Cyrus at Gergis on Mount Ida; it was attributed to the Hellespontine Sibyl and was preserved in the temple of Apollo at Gergis. From Gergis the collection passed to Erythrae, where it became famous as the oracles of the Erythraean Sibyl. It seems to have been this very collection, or so it would appear, which found its way to Cumae (see the Cumaean Sibyl) and from Cumae to Rome.

=== Mythology ===
Mount Ida owes much of its fame to the work of the poet Homer, gaining renown from having been mentioned in his epic poem the Iliad. It is the setting for numerous episodes in Ancient Greek myth. For example, in the Iliad, Mount Ida plays an essential role for the lives of Trojans in the city of Troy. Part of Troy's water source came from the rivers along Mount Ida, while the city uses the mountain to collect wood as well. Trojans also used the peaks on Mount Ida for religious purposes, while in the Iliad, Zeus stayed on the peak at Gargarus on Mount Ida for a period of time in the poem.

==== Idaea ====
Idaea was a nymph, mate of the river god Scamander, and mother of King Teucer the Trojan king. The Scamander River flowed from Mount Ida across the plain beneath the city of Troy, and joined the Hellespont north of the city.

==== Ganymede ====
At an earlier time, on Mount Ida, Ganymede, the son of Tros or perhaps of Laomedon, both kings of Troy, was desired by Zeus, who descended in the form of an eagle and swept up Ganymede, to be cupbearer to the Olympian gods.

==== Hermaphroditus ====
In The Metamorphoses, Ovid writes that Hermaphroditus, the child of Hermes and Aphrodite, was taken after birth to be raised for fifteen years by the Naids of Mount Ida.

==== Paris ====
On the sacred mountain, the nymphs who were the daughter-spirits of the river Cebrenus, had their haunt, and one, Oenone, who had the chthonic gifts of prophetic vision and the curative powers of herb magic, wed Paris, living as a shepherd on Mount Ida. Unbeknownst to all, even to himself, Paris was the son of Priam, king of Troy. He was there on Mount Ida, experiencing the rustic education in exile of many heroes of Greek mythology, for his disastrous future effect on Troy was foretold at his birth, and Priam had him exposed on the sacred slopes. When the good shepherd who was entrusted with the baby returned to bury the exposed child, he discovered that he had been suckled by a she-bear (a totem animal of the archaic goddess Artemis) and took the child home to be foster-nursed by his wife.

When Eris ("discord") cast the Apple of Discord, inscribed "for the fairest", into the wedding festivities of Peleus with Thetis, three great goddesses repaired to Mount Ida to be appraised. By a sacred spring on the mountainside, in "the Judgment of Paris", the grown youth Paris awarded it to Aphrodite, who offered Helen for a bribe, earning the perpetual enmity of the discredited goddesses Hera and Athena to the Trojan cause (Bibliotheca 3.12.5).

==== Anchises ====
Anchises, father of Aeneas, also of the Trojan royal house, was tending sheep on Mount Ida when he was seduced by Aphrodite. Their union led to the birth of Aeneas, the mythological progenitor of Rome's Julio-Claudian dynasty and a founder of Rome.

==== Trojan War ====
The mountain is the scene of several mythic events in the works of Homer. At its summit, the Olympian gods gathered to watch the progress of the epic fight. But the mountain was the sacred place of the Goddess, and Hera's powers were so magnified on Mount Ida, that she was able to distract Zeus with her seductions, just long enough to permit Poseidon to intercede on behalf of the Argives to drive Hektor and the Trojans back from the ships.

During the Trojan War, in an episode recorded in Epitome of the fourth book of the Bibliotheca, Achilles with some of the Achaean chiefs laid waste the countryside, and made his way to Ida to rustle the cattle of Aeneas. But Aeneas fled, and Achilles killed the cowherds and Mestor, son of Priam, and drove away the sacred kine (Epitome 3.32). Achilles briefly refers to this incident as he prepares to duel with Aeneas during the siege of Troy. (Iliad XX)

After the Trojan War, the only surviving son of Priam, Helenus, retired to Mount Ida, where he was surprised and became the captive of Neoptolemus. In the Aeneid a shooting star falls onto the mountain in answer to the prayer of Anchises to Jupiter.

== History ==
=== Bronze age ===
In the Bronze Age, the region around the mountain complex had a somewhat chequered ethnography. There is evidence for the following peoples with a reasonable degree of probability:

- The Tjeker in Ayvacık, Çanakkale Province, which the Greeks called the Teucri. They were probably from Crete and are most likely to have been the source of the name, Mount Ida, which they took from Mount Ida, Crete.

=== Iron age ===
In historical times, Xerxes' march took him past Mount Ida (Herodotus VII:42).

== 2019 Controversy ==
In July 2019, protesters made accusations against Canadian company Alamos Gold for constructing a mine in Mount Ida, despite the fact that the mine was located 40 km away from Mount Ida, within the borders of the Biga Mountains and in the skirts of Balaban Hill. The Republic of Turkey prohibits mining in National Parks, Natural Preserves, Archeological Sites and Wildlife Protection Areas. Protesters criticized that thousands of trees were cleared as well as plans to use cyanide to extract gold. The Turkish government and company responded with claims that the mine would not damage the environment. Protesters began a "Water and Conscience Watch" on July 26. A "Great Water and Conscience Meeting" was then held on August 5, during which protesters entered the mining site and symbolically planted trees in front of the press. Local residents near the village of Kirazlı criticized the protesters who came to the region with misinformation. Images of the land which had been cleared of trees also caused outrage on social media. Artist Zülfü Livaneli wrote an open letter to UNESCO protesting about the destruction of the natural environment in the area. In 2021, the mining company filed an investment treaty claim exceeding $1 billion against Turkey for "unfair and inequitable treatment".

== See also ==
- Mount Ida
- Idaea
