= Edremit, Balıkesir =

Edremit
- District and municipality
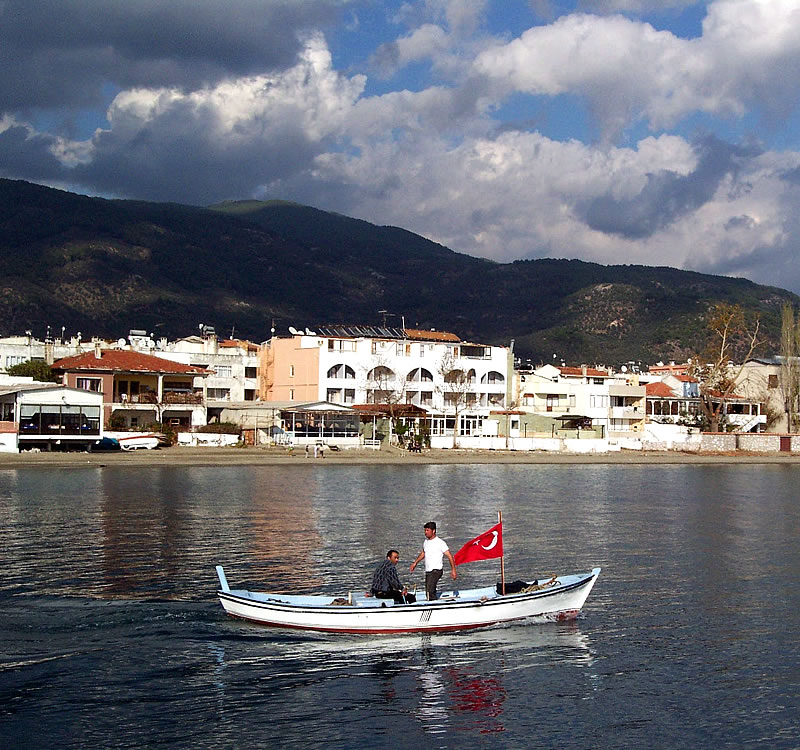
- Altınoluk

- Logo

- Map showing Edremit District in Balıkesir Province

- Location within Turkey Location within Marmara
- Coordinates: 39°35′32″N 27°01′12″E
- Country: Turkey
- Province: Balıkesir

Government
  - Mayor: Mehmet Ertaş (CHP)
- Area: 682 km^{2} (263 sq mi)
- Elevation: 29 m (95 ft)
- Population (2022): 167,901
  - Density: 246/km^{2} (638/sq mi)
- Time zone: UTC+3 (TRT)
- Postal code: 10300
- Area code: 0266
- Website: www.edremit.bel.tr

Edremit is a municipality and district of Balıkesir Province, Turkey. Its area is 682 km^{2} (263 sq mi), and its population is 167,901 (2022). It is situated a few kilometres inland from the Gulf of Edremit. The mayor of Edremit municipality is Selman Hasan Arslan.

== History ==
The modern city of Edremit is named after the ancient city of Adramyttion (Ἀδραμύττιον) or Adramytteion (Ἀδραμύττειον), a city of Asia Minor on the coast of Aeolis which is near the modern city of Burhaniye.

Tahtacı Turkmen, descendants of the army of Shah Ismail I, settled in the mountains near Edremit after their defeat in the Battle of Chaldiran in 1514. By 1819, Henry Alexander Scammell Dearborn recorded that Edremit was only populated by "a few Greek fishermen". In 1912, the town had 6200 inhabitants, 1200 of whom were Greeks. At this time, the district had 19 Greek schools and roughly 600 pupils.

In May 1914, thousands of Muslim refugees who had fled from the Balkans arrived in the town of Edremit and proceeded to ransack the shops and homes of the town's Greek community. According to Arnold J. Toynbee, the Ottoman government armed and organised the refugees. Many Greek refugees found refuge in the town church before fleeing to the harbour where they were then granted passage to the nearby Greek island of Lesbos. Turks continued to massacre or expel Greeks in the following months in surrounding villages as part of the wider Greek genocide throughout Turkey.

Amidst the Greek Summer Offensive of the Greco-Turkish War of 1919–1922, Edremit was seized by the Army of Asia Minor on 19 June 1920 and a Turkish Nationalist counterattack near the town was repelled. It remained under Greek control until their withdrawal in late August 1922, following which the entire region was recaptured by the Turks and all remaining Greeks fled or were killed by the Turkish army.

== Composition ==
There are 47 neighbourhoods in Edremit District:

- Akçay
- Altınkum
- Altınoluk
- Arıtaşı
- Atatürk
- Avcılar
- Beyoba
- Bostancı
- Çamcı
- Camivasat
- Çamlıbel
- Cennetayağı
- Çıkrıkçı
- Cumhuriyet
- Darsofa
- Dereli
- Doyuran
- Eroğlan
- Gazicelal
- Gaziilyas
- Güre
- Güre-Cumhuriyet
- Hacıarslanlar
- Hacıtuğrul
- Hamidiye
- Hekimzade
- İbrahimce
- İkizçay
- İskele
- Kadıköy
- Kapıcıbaşı
- Kavlaklar
- Kızılkeçili
- Mehmetalanı
- Narlı
- Ortaoba
- Pınarbaşı
- Şahindere
- Sarıkız
- Soğanyemez
- Tahtakuşlar
- Turhanbey
- Tuzcumurat
- Yaşyer
- Yaylaönü
- Yolören
- Zeytinli

== Climate ==
Edremit has a hot-summer Mediterranean climate (Köppen: Csa), with hot, dry summers, and cool, wet winters.

Climate data for Edremit, Balıkesir (1991–2020)
| Month | Jan | Feb | Mar | Apr | May | Jun | Jul | Aug | Sep | Oct | Nov | Dec | Year |
|---|---|---|---|---|---|---|---|---|---|---|---|---|---|
| Mean daily maximum °C (°F) | 12.0 (53.6) | 13.1 (55.6) | 16.2 (61.2) | 20.7 (69.3) | 26.2 (79.2) | 31.0 (87.8) | 33.7 (92.7) | 33.8 (92.8) | 29.4 (84.9) | 23.8 (74.8) | 18.2 (64.8) | 13.4 (56.1) | 22.7 (72.9) |
| Daily mean °C (°F) | 7.6 (45.7) | 8.4 (47.1) | 10.9 (51.6) | 14.9 (58.8) | 20.2 (68.4) | 24.9 (76.8) | 27.7 (81.9) | 27.7 (81.9) | 23.1 (73.6) | 18.0 (64.4) | 13.0 (55.4) | 9.2 (48.6) | 17.2 (63.0) |
| Mean daily minimum °C (°F) | 4.0 (39.2) | 4.6 (40.3) | 6.3 (43.3) | 9.6 (49.3) | 14.3 (57.7) | 18.8 (65.8) | 21.9 (71.4) | 22.3 (72.1) | 17.8 (64.0) | 13.5 (56.3) | 9.0 (48.2) | 5.9 (42.6) | 12.4 (54.3) |
| Average precipitation mm (inches) | 95.19 (3.75) | 98.15 (3.86) | 73.43 (2.89) | 60.59 (2.39) | 34.88 (1.37) | 23.63 (0.93) | 5.8 (0.23) | 4.7 (0.19) | 26.9 (1.06) | 70.16 (2.76) | 94.57 (3.72) | 103.72 (4.08) | 691.72 (27.23) |
| Average precipitation days (≥ 1.0 mm) | 8.3 | 7.4 | 6.7 | 6.0 | 4.7 | 2.9 | 1.6 | 1.2 | 3.0 | 4.4 | 7.1 | 8.6 | 61.9 |
| Average relative humidity (%) | 69.0 | 66.5 | 62.8 | 60.6 | 55.5 | 50.2 | 45.9 | 47.8 | 54.2 | 63.2 | 68.8 | 69.9 | 59.5 |
Source: NOAA

== Notable people ==
- Germanos Karavangelis (1866–1935), Metropolitan Bishop of Kastoria and later Amaseia
- Benjamin I of Constantinople (1871–1946), Ecumenical Patriarch of Constantinople
- Panos Dukakis (1896–1979), father of American politician Michael Dukakis
- Sabahattin Ali (1907–1948), author and journalist
- Hülya Avşar (b. 1963), actress
- Caner Erkin (b. 1988), professional footballer
- Afra Saraçoğlu (b. 1997), actress

== Twin towns – sister cities ==
Edremit is twinned with:

- Amaliada, Greece since 2000
- Kamp-Lintfort, Germany since 2009
- Erdenet, Mongolia since 2010
- Nicolosi, Italy since 2010

== Bibliography ==
- Ayliffe, Rosie (2003). The Rough Guide to Turkey. Rough Guides. ISBN 9781843530718.
- Dearborn, Henry Alexander Scammell (1819). A Memoir on the Commerce and Navigation of the Black Sea: And the Trade and Maritime Geography of Turkey and Egypt, Vol. 2. Wells & Lilly. p. 51. "adramiti."
- Dieterich, Karl (1918). Hellenism in Asia Minor. Translated by Carrol N. Brown. Oxford University Press.
- Erickson, Edward J. (2021). The Turkish War of Independence: a Military History, 1919-1923. ABC-CLIO.
- Kiminas, Demetrius (2009). The Ecumenical Patriarchate: A History of Its Metropolitanates with Annotated Hierarch Catalogs. Wildside Press LLC. ISBN 9781434458766.
- Milton, Giles (2009). Paradise Lost: Smyrna 1922. Sceptre. ISBN 9780340837870.
- Pétridès, S. (1912). Dictionnaire d'Histoire et de Géographie Ecclésiastiques, ed. R. Aubert & E. Van Cauwenberch, vol. 1 (in French).
