= Gez Island =

Turkish island in the Aegean

Gez Adası
- Location within Turkey

Geography
- Location: Aegean Sea
- Coordinates: 39°22′N 26°42′E

Administration
- Turkey
- İl (province): Balıkesir Province
- İlçe: Ayvalık

Gez Adası (English: Gez Island, also known as its outdated name Balık Adası) is a Turkish island in the northern Aegean Sea.

The island is a part of the Ayvalık Northern Islands group in Ayvalık district of the Balıkesir Province, administered by Turkey and is located at 39°22'40"N 26°42'23"E. The island is situated between Kutu Island (Also known as Küçük Karaada Island) and Yumurta Island with it being in close promximity to Akoğlu Island and Cunda Island. It is located 2.84 kilometers (1.76 miles) away from the shore and is currently uninhabited.

== Toponymy ==
The historical name for the island is Daskaleió (Greek: Δασκαλειό) with the island having a range of local names in Turkish such as Büyük Karaada (or simply Kara Ada) and Balık Adası. The name Gez comes from the Turkish word "to travel" while another version of the island's name, Balık Adası, is derived from the word "Balık" in Turkish meaning fish. The name for nearby Kutu Island (Küçük Karaada Island) is related to another name of the island, Büyük Karaada. Büyük translates to "big" or "large" while Küçük translates to "small" in Turkish, meaning that the toponymy of these 2 islands were connected due to their proximity and size difference.

== Historical artefacts ==
The island contains many historical Ancient Roman and Greek artifacts such as graves, tombstones, silver and gold coins because of its geopolitical location in the province of Asia as a part of the Roman Empire and as a part of the ancient Greek city states. Due to the island's historical nature, it has been subjected to illegal grave robbing and archeological looting in the past decade. Some of the island's historical artifacts date all the way back to the ancient town of Pordoselene, a tributary to City State of Athens, dating back to the 5th and 4th centuries BCE. Nearby islands such as Büyük Maden Island contain similar archeological artifacts from the Pordoselene, indicating a group of ancient Greeks once inhibited the islands.
