= List of Greek actors =

This is a list of Greek actors.

- Alekos Alexandrakis – Αλέκος Αλεξανδράκης (1928–2005)
- Anthimos Ananiadis – Άνθιμος Ανανιάδης (b. 1985)
- Jennifer Aniston – Ιωάννα Αναστασάκη (b. 1969)
- John Aniston – Ιωάννης Αναστασάκης (1933–2022)
- Vasilis Avlonitis – Βασίλης Αυλωνίτης (1904–1970)
- Pipina Bonasera – Πιπίνα Βονασέρα (1838–1927)
- Georges Corraface – Γιώργος Χωραφάς (b. 1952)
- Cybele – Κυβέλη (1887–1978)
- Jacques Damala – Aριστεíδης Δαμαλάς (1855–1889)
- Meropi Rozan – Μερόπη Ροζάν (1895–1977)
- Rika Dialina – Ειρήνη "Ρίκα" Διαλυνά (b. 1931)
- Lavrentis Dianellos – Λαυρέντης Διανέλλος (1911–1978)
- Andreas Douzos – Ανδρέας Ντούζος (1936–2013)
- Chronis Exarhakos – Χρόνης Εξαρχάκος (1932–1984)
- Giorgos Fountas – Γιώργος Φούντας (1924–2010)
- Tasos Giannopoulos – Τάσος Γιαννόπουλος (1931–1977)
- Giannis Gionakis – Γιάννης Γκιωνάκης (1922–2002)
- Angelos Grammenos – Άγγελος Γραμμένος (b. 1958)
- Stathis Giallelis – Στάθης Γιαλελής (b. 1941)
- Kostas Hatzichristos – Κώστας Χατζηχρήστος (1921–2001)
- Antonis Kafetzopoulos – Αντώνης Καφετζόπουλος (b. 1951)
- Tzeni Karezi – Τζένη Καρέζη (1932–1992)
- Kostas Kazakos – Κώστας Καζάκος (1935–2022)
- Smaragda Karydi – Σμαράγδα Καρύδη (b. 1969)
- Kora Karvouni – Κόρα Καρβούνη (b. 1980)
- Vangelis Kazan – Βαγγέλης Καζάν (1936–2008)
- Vassili Karis – Βασίλης Καραμεσίνης (b. 1938)
- Manos Katrakis – Μάνος Κατράκης (1908–1984)
- Lambros Konstantaras – Λάμπρος Κωσταντάρας (1913–1985)
- Giorgos Konstantinou – Γιώργος Κωνσταντίνου (b. 1934)
- Elias Koteas – Ηλίας Κοτέας (b. 1961)
- Pavlos Kourtidis – Παύλος Κουρτίδης (b. 1975)
- Zoe Laskari – Ζωή Λάσκαρη (1943–2017)
- Thanos Leivaditis – Θάνος Λειβαδίτης (1934–2005)
- Zeta Makrypoulia – Ζέτα Μακρυπούλια (b. 1978)
- Costas Mandylor – Κώστας Θεοδοσόπουλος (b. 1965)
- Louis Mandylor – Λούης Θεοδοσόπουλος (b. 1966)
- Melina Mercouri – Μελίνα Μερκούρη (1920–1994)
- Giannis Michalopoulos – Γιάννης Μιχαλόπουλος (1927–2016)
- Panos Mihalopoulos – Πάνος Μιχαλόπουλος (b. 1949)
- Sofia Milos – Σοφία Μίλος (b. 1969)
- Memos Mpegnis – Mέμος Μπεγνής (b. 1974)
- Elena Nathanael – Έλενα Ναθαναήλ (1947–2008)
- Dimitris Nikolaidis – Δημήτρης Νικολαΐδης (1922–1993)
- Dinos Iliopoulos – Ντίνος Ηλιόπουλος (1913–2001)
- Clio-Danae Othoneou – Κλειώ-Δανάη Οθωναίου (b. 1979)
- Dionysis Papagiannopoulos – Διονύσης Παπαγιαννόπουλος (1912–1984)
- Dimitris Papamichael – Δημήτρης Παπαμιχαήλ (1934–2004)
- Irene Papas – Ειρήνη Παππά (1926–2022)
- Katina Paxinou – Κατίνα Παξινού (1900–1973)
- Anna Rezan – Άννα Ρεζάν (b. 1992)
- Nikos Rizos – Νίκος Ρίζος (1924–1999)
- Angelique Rockas – Αγγελική Ρόκα (b. 1979)
- Telly Savalas – Τέλης Σαβάλας (1922–1994)
- Kostas Triantafyllopoulos – Κώστας Τριανταφυλλόπουλος (1956–2021)
- Titos Vandis Τίτος Βανδής (1907–2003)
- Aimilios Veakis – Αιμίλιος Βεάκης (1884–1951)
- Antigone Valakou – Αντιγόνη Βαλάκου (1930–2013)
- Nora Valsami – Νορα Βαλσάμη (b. 1948)
- Thanassis Veggos – Θανάσσης Βέγγος (1927–2011)
- Giorgos Velentzas – Γιώργος Βελέντζας (1927–2015)
- Rena Vlahopoulou – Ρένα Βλαχοπούλου (1923–2004)
- Giannis Voglis – Γιάννης Βόγλης (1937–2016)
- Lefteris Voyatzis – Λευτέρης Βογιατζής (1945–2013)
- Yorgo Voyagis – Γιώργος Βογιατζής (b. 1945)
- Aliki Vougiouklaki – Αλίκη Βουγιουκλάκη (1934–1996)
- Nikos Xanthopoulos – Νίκος Ξανθόπουλος (1934–2023)
- Pantelis Zervos – Παντελής Ζερβός (1908–1982)
- Voula Zouboulaki – Βούλα Ζουμπουλάκη (1924–2015)
