= Cisthene (disambiguation) =

Cisthene is a genus of moths.

Cisthene or Kisthene may also refer to:

- Cisthene, another ancient name of the island of Megiste
- Cisthene (Lycia), a town of ancient Lycia, now in Turkey
- Cisthene (Mysia), a town of ancient Mysia, now in Turkey
- Cisthene, a place with the mythical Gorgoneian plains mentioned in the Prometheus Vinctus of Aeschylus
