= Gregory Orologas =

Greek Orthodox metropolitan bishop

Saint Gregory of Kydonies Ἅγιος Γρηγόρος Κυδωνιών
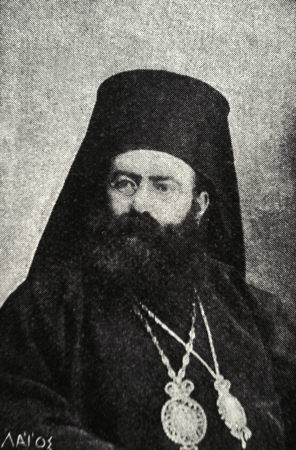

Metropolitan of Kydonies New Ethno-Hieromartyr
- Born: 1864; Manisa, Ottoman Empire.
- Died: October 3, 1922; Altınova, Ottoman Empire.
- Venerated in: Eastern Orthodox Church
- Canonized: November 4, 1992, by Church of Greece. (Note: On 4 November 1992, the Holy Synod of the Church of Greece unanimously declared Bp. Chrysostomos of Smyrna (†1922) an Ethnomartyr and a Saint of the Orthodox Church, to be jointly commemorated on the Sunday before the Feast of the Elevation of the Holy Cross, together with four other Holy Hierarchs of Asia Minor including: Bp. Ambrosios of Moschonision; Bp. Euthymios (Agritellis) of Zela (†1921); Bp. Gregorios of Kidonion (†1922); and; Bp. Procopius of Iconium.; Their ranking to the chorus of the Saints, was formally announced in: Encyclical 2556, of 5 July 1993, of the Holy Synod of the Church of Greece; (in Greek) Εγκύκλιος 2556 της 5ης Ιουλίου 1993 της Ιεράς Συνόδου της Εκκλησίας της Ελλάδος).)
- Feast: Sunday before the Exaltation of the Holy Cross (September 7–13)

Saint Gregory (Orologas) of Kydonies the Ethno-Hieromartyr, also Gregory of Cydoniae (Greek: Γρηγόριος Ωρολογάς Gregorios Orologas), 1864–1922, was a Greek Orthodox metropolitan bishop in the early 20th century in northwest Anatolia, in the Ottoman Empire.

He was initially the Metropolitan of Strumica, in the region of Macedonia (October 12, 1902 – July 22, 1908), and then became the Metropolitan of Kydonies (modern Ayvalık), in northwestern Anatolia (July 22, 1908 – October 3, 1922). He was executed by the Turkish Army at the end of the Greco-Turkish War (1919–1922).

He is commemorated by the Greek Orthodox Church as an Ethno-Hieromartyr (Greek: Ἐθνοϊερομάρτυρας); his feast day is celebrated on the Sunday before the Exaltation of the Holy Cross each year (September 7–13).

== Early life ==
Gregory was born in Manisa (Magnesia), Ottoman Empire in 1864. His secular name was Anastasios Orologas or Saatsoglou.

In 1882, he was admitted to the Theological School of Halki, supported by the Metropolitan of Ephesus, Agathangelos. When he entered the Theological School, he translated his surname from Saatsoglou to Orologas.

He was a brilliant student and successfully completed his studies in 1889 by submitting his dissertation titled "The Holy Evangelists never disagreed over the Lord’s last Passover (Easter)". In the last year of his studies, according to the old custom, he became a priest, becoming first ordained a deacon and changing his name to Gregorios.

After his graduation he served in various dioceses including Thessaloniki, Serres and Drama. Initially he served as a deacon and instructor of religion, and later as an Archimandrite, Protosyngellos and Preacher. He was among the first preachers who included the Demotic language in his sermons.

== Metropolitan of Strumica ==
On October 12, 1902, he was appointed Metropolitan Bishop of the important Metropolis of Strumica, in the region of Macedonia. Here he faced struggles not only against the Turks, but especially against the Bulgarian Revolutionary Committee, whose members tried several times to assassinate him in 1905. (Note: (in Greek) "Στὶς 12 Ὀκτωβρίου 1902 χειροτονήθηκε μητροπολίτης στὴ σπουδαία, ἀπὸ ἐθνικῆς ἀπόψεως, ἐπαρχία Τιβεριουπόλεως καὶ Στρωμνίτσης στὴν ὁποία ἀγωνίστηκε ὄχι μόνο κατὰ τῶν τούρκων, ἀλλὰ ἰδιαίτερα ἐναντίον τοῦ βουλγαρικοῦ κομιτάτου, μέλη τοῦ ὁποίου προσπάθησαν, πολλὲς φορές, νὰ τὸν δολοφονήσουν (1905).")

Metropolitan Gregory remained in office for six years. On July 22, 1908, the Ecumenical Patriarchate, following pressure by the Ottoman government, was compelled to transfer him to the newly established Diocese of Cydoniae, in modern Ayvalık, Turkey, on the western coast of Anatolia.

== Metropolitan of Kydonies ==
During his first years in office in Cydoniae, he supported the expansion of educational and charity institutions in the region. However, the period in which Metropolitan Gregory shepherded the Diocese was one of the most turbulent in the history of the Ottoman Empire.

Several "patriotic" manifestations of the Greek Orthodox were considered a threat to the stability of Ottoman power, and so local authorities implemented martial law in the city from July to August 1909. Many Greek Orthodox inhabitants were persecuted and sent to prison in that period. Metropolitan Gregory tried to intervene with the Ottoman authorities on their behalf. His protests led to the release of several prisoners. However, many of them remained in the Halicarnassus prison, even though martial law ended after one month.

During World War I, he was accused of high treason and was tried twice at a military tribunal in Smyrna. Although the accusations against Metropolitan Gregory were not proven, he was convicted and imprisoned in 1917. After the capitulation of the Ottoman Empire, he was released on October 16, 1918. He returned to Cydoniae.

=== Initiatives during the Greco-Turkish War ===
In May 1919, the Greek Army occupied the region with approval from the Great Powers. Cydoniae became part of the Smyrna Occupation Zone. Metropolitan Gregory remained in Cydoniae, although many times he came into conflict with Aristeidis Stergiadis, the Greek High Commissioner in Smyrna .

Due to the developments of the Greco-Turkish War, the Greek civil and military authorities had to retreat from the area in August 1922. Before the advancing Turkish Army reached Cydoniae, Gregory convened the local council of elders ( 'dimogerontia' ) and proposed the immediate evacuation of all civilians from the area, worried that Turkish recapture would lead to massacres in the city. However, his recommendations were not accepted.

Violence against the Greek residents of Cydoniae began in August 1922, when the first irregular bands of the Turkish Army entered the city. Martial law was declared. During the following days, all adult males were arrested and driven on a forced march away from the city. On the road leading to the village of Freneli (near modern Havran), they were shot down with machine guns.

Gregory tried to save the remaining Christians in the city by intervening with the Turkish authorities, which did not hesitate to humiliate him. (Note: The Ottoman policy of genocide dramatically decreased the population of the area and caused general chaos and instability.)

After 6,000 of the inhabitants of Moschonesia were also massacred, including Metropolitan Ambrosios, Metropolitan Gregory secretly contacted the American Red Cross for help. The Red Cross secured ships from Lesbos in order to carry the women and children to safety. The Turkish authorities agreed to this proposition. As a result, the largest part of the Greek Orthodox population of the city – 20,000 out of 35,000 – were saved by Greek ships sailing under the American flag.

Although he encouraged all the priests of the city to leave, Metropolitan Gregory stayed back. On September 30, 1922, while all the priests were gathered on the waterfront ready to depart, Turkish authorities arrested them. Authorities also detained Metropolitan Gregory. They were taken to the prison beside the city hospital and tortured.

On October 3, 1922, the clergy were taken outside of the town to be killed. According to witnesses, Metropolitan Gregory died of a heart attack before when the Turkish troops attempted to bury him alive.

Ten years later, in 1932, on the initiative of the Metropolitan of Mytilene, Iakovos of Dyrrachion, Metropolitan Gregory’s statue was put up in Mytilene. Many surviving members of Metropolitan Gregory's congregation had escaped to this island. The inscription on the statue reads: "Metropolitan of Cydoniae, Gregorios. Martyred in 1922. The good shepherd laid down his life for the sheep (John 10:11)."

Eastern Orthodox Church titles
Preceded by Panaretos (Petridis) (1899–1900)	Metropolitan of Tiberiopolis and Stromnitsa; October 12, 1902 – July 22, 1908	Succeeded by Germanos (Anastasiadis) (1908–1910)
Preceded by Joachim II (Efthyvoulis) (Metropolitan of Ephesus) (1897–1920)	Metropolitan of Kydonies (Note: The area was under the jurisdiction of the Metropolitanate of Ephesus until a Metropolitanate of Kydonies was established on July 22, 1908.); July 22, 1908 – October 3, 1922	Succeeded by Eugenios (Theologou / Vakalis) (1924–1928)

== Sources ==
- Great Synaxaristes: (in Greek) Ὁ Ἅγιος Γρηγόριος ὁ Ἐθνοϊερομάρτυρας. ΜΕΓΑΣ ΣΥΝΑΞΑΡΙΣΤΗΣ. 12 Σεπτεμβρίου.
- Stamatopoulos, Dimitrios. "Gregorios of Cydoniae". Transl. Velentzas, Georgios. Encyclopaedia of the Hellenic World, Asia Minor. 5/22/2002. Retrieved: 10 August 2014.
- Kiminas, Demetrius (2009). The Ecumenical Patriarchate: A History of Its Metropolitanates with Annotated Hierarch Catalogs. Wildside Press LLC. ISBN 9781434458766.
