= Elevation of the Cross (disambiguation) =

In the Orthodox Church the Elevation of the Holy Cross commemorates the revealing of True Cross on September 14 This feast also known in the West as the Exaltation of the Cross.

Elevation of the Cross or Raising of the Cross may also refer to:

- The Elevation of the Cross (Rubens), a 1610-1611 painting by Peter Paul Rubens depicting Christ being raised on the Cross.
- The Raising of the Cross, a c.1633 painting by Rembrandt
