= Çıplak Island =

Island in Turkey

Native name: Çıplak Adası
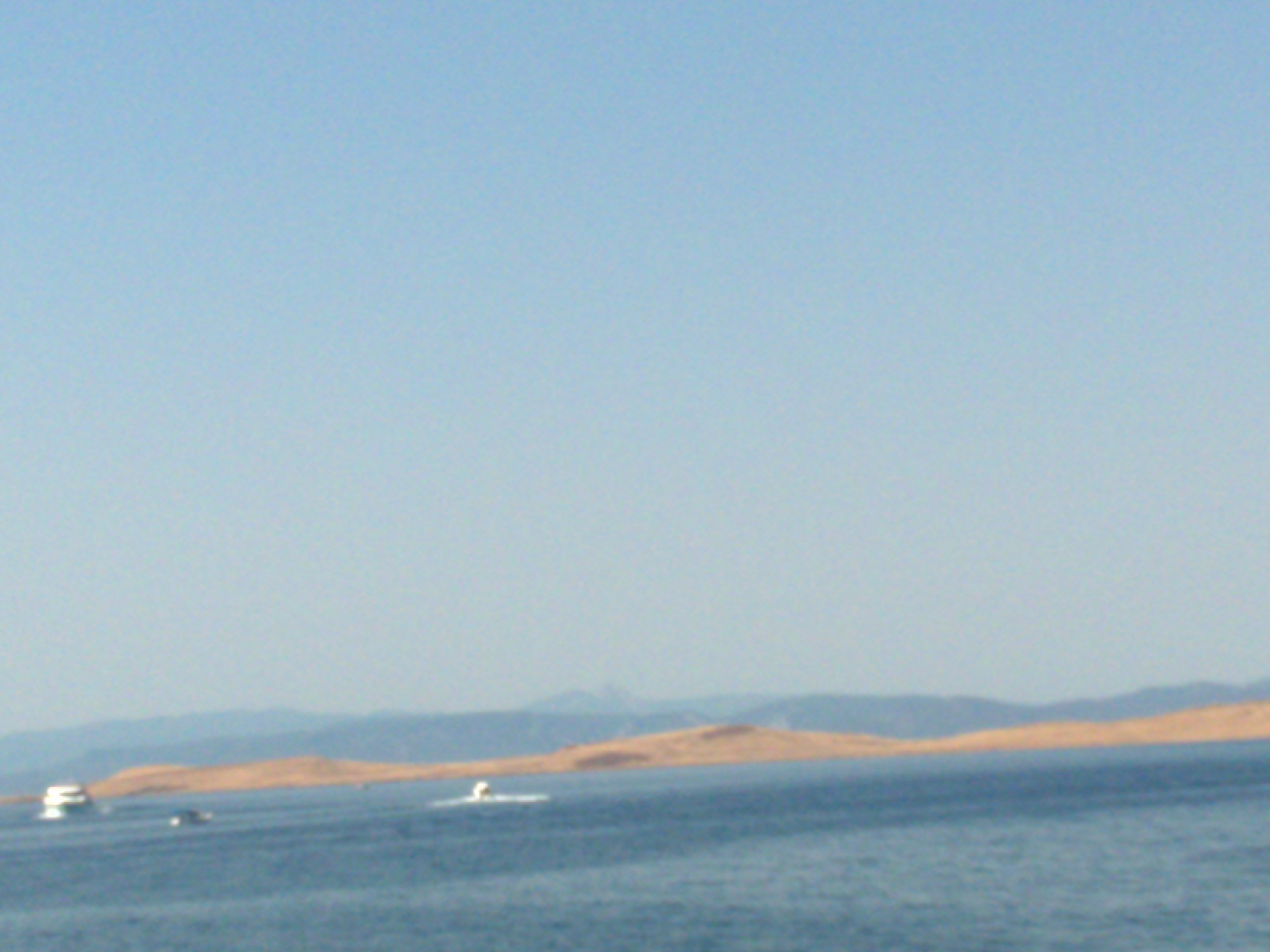
- Çıplak Island

- Location within Turkey

Geography
- Location: Aegean Sea
- Coordinates: 39°17′13″N 26°35′30″E

Administration
- Turkey
- İl (province): Balıkesir Province
- İlçe: Ayvalık

Çıplak Island (Turkish: Çıplak Ada, meaning "Barren island", Chalkis of the antiquity, in Greek known as Gymno (Greek: Γυμνό)) is an Aegean island of Turkey.

The island at 39°17′13″N 26°35′30″E is a part of Ayvalık ilçe (district) of Balıkesir Province. Its distance to mainland is 800 metres (2,600 ft). With an area of 230 hectares (570 acres) it is one of the larger islands around Ayvalık. It’s the southernmost island of the Ayvalık Islands archipelago, and the only one with shores to both Edremit Gulf and Dikili Gulf.

The uninhabited island was a natural pasture for sheep breeding. Every year the shepherds used to bring sheep herd to the island. However they now complain of rabbits which infest the grazing land.
