= Çıplak =

Çıplak can refer to:

- Çıplak Island
- Çıplak, Çanakkale
