= Georgios Tombras =

Greek military officer

- Γεώργιος Τόμπρας
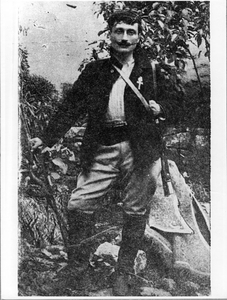
- Tombras during the Macedonian Struggle.
- Born: 1 January 1878; Kydonies, Bursa Vilayet, Ottoman Empire (now Republic of Turkey
- Died: 20 April 1963 (aged 85); Chalandri, Kingdom of Greece
- Military career
- Allegiance: Kingdom of Greece
- Branch: Hellenic Army
- Service years: 1897–1913
- Rank: Lieutenant
- Nickname: Kapetan Roupakias (Καπετάν Ρουπακιάς)
- Conflicts: Macedonian Struggle; Balkan Wars: First Balkan War; Second Balkan War
- Other work: Pharmacist

Georgios Tombras (Greek: Γεώργιος Τόμπρας) was a Greek military officer who became a guerrilla leader in the Macedonian Struggle in the early 20th century under the nom de guerre Roupakias (Ρουπακιάς).

== Biography ==
Georgios Tombras was born in the then mostly Greek-speaking Asia Minor city of Kydonies (also known as Aivali, present-day Ayvalık). He was commissioned a lieutenant and served in the Greek Army as a pharmacist. He went to Macedonia in 1905 as a secretary in the detachment of Stavros Rigas ("Captain Kavodoros"), later he was with rebel Georgios Katechakis ("Captain Rouvas") in Kastoria. In September 1906 he was the lieutenant of Konstantinos Saros during the fighting at Giannitsa Lake. Later that year he returned to Greece, according to sources, after entering into a serious dispute with Saros.

After his furlough, he returned to Macedonia, this time active in the Nestorio sector. He cooperated with Stefos Grigoriou, and along with the guerrilla bands of Ioannis Terzis and Nikolaos Platanias ("Captain Lachtaras") gave battle on 3 July 1907 against a detachment of IMRO, in which the Bulgarian chieftain [[Atanas Krshakov]] was killed. During the Balkan Wars (1912–1913) he operated for a year in Western Macedonia as the lieutenant of Georgios Katechakis, taking part in one of the so-called First Battle of Nicopolis (known by its ancient name) in the area of Preveza in Epirus. The main action occurred on 19 October 1912, after Greek troops began marshalling on the 16th, prefatory to Greece's declaration of war on the 17th. Tombras as a lieutenant led the centre of the Greek line in support of Captain Katechakis and 2nd Lieutenant Zoudianos who advanced in a pincer movement backed by a number of Greek volunteer corps under various leaders while, counter-battery fire under a Lieutenant Khavikis suppressed the Turkish artillery, much of which was later captured, along with other equipment The main battle lasted ten hours.

In November 1912, one Georgios Tombras alias "Polyhniatis" joined others in sending a letter detailing the state of Turkish defences at Moudros that led to the Hellenic Navy taking part in the Liberation of Lemnos (the annexation of the Greek-speaking island by the Kingdom of Greece) under Pavlos Kountouriotis. It is not clear whether this Georgios Tombras was the same person as the makedonomahos fighter, whether he was a spy for the Greek military, or what other role, if any, he played in the subsequent fighting.

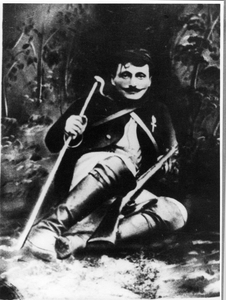
Tombras

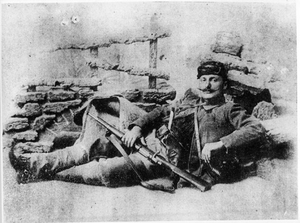
Tombras
