= Küçükköy, Ayvalık =

Küçükköy
- Neighbourhood
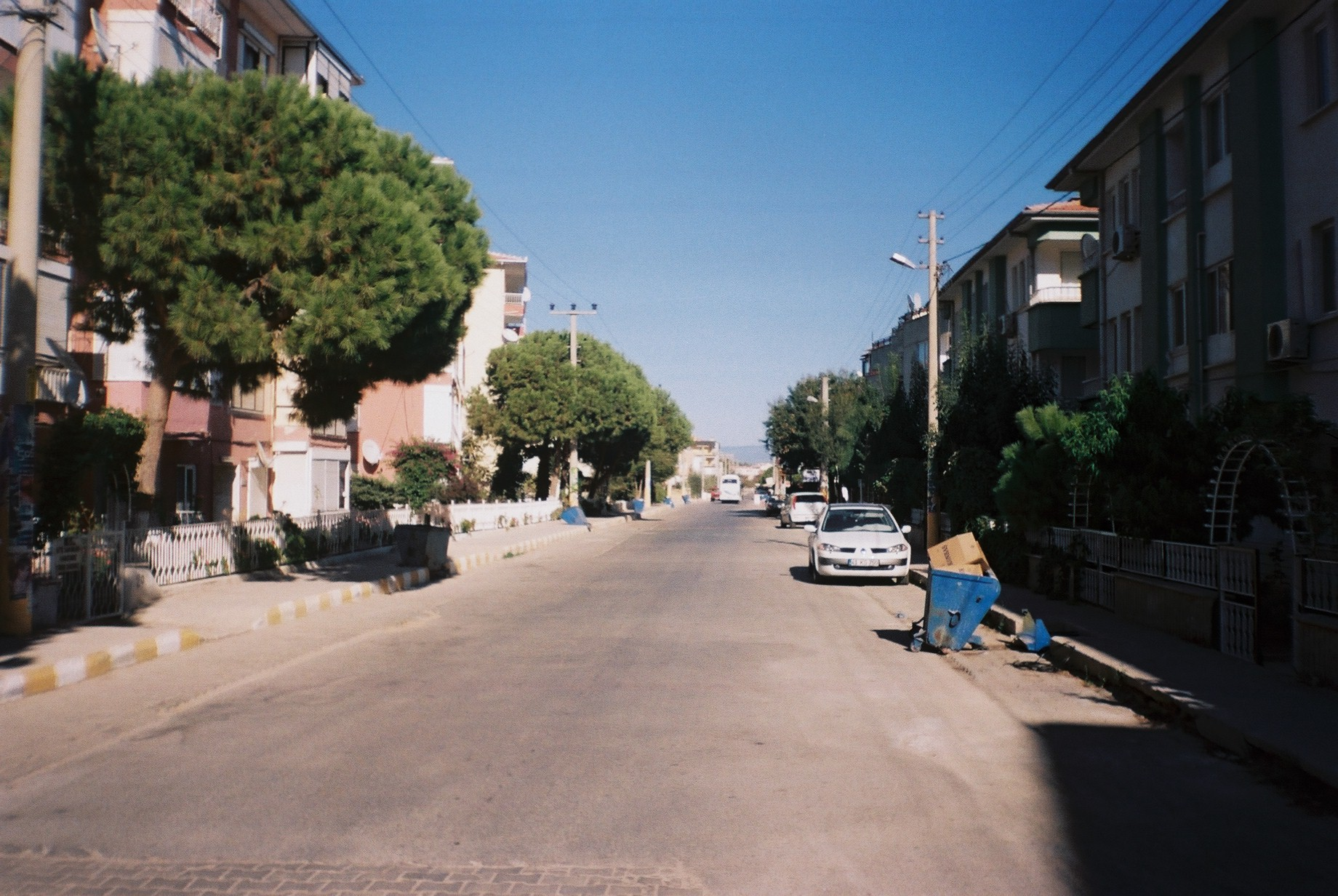
- Street in Sarımsaklı

- Location within Turkey Location within Marmara
- Coordinates: 39°17′24″N 26°41′13″E
- Country: Turkey
- Province: Balıkesir
- District: Ayvalık
- Population (2022): 1,105
- Time zone: UTC+3 (TRT)

Küçükköy is a neighbourhood of the municipality and district of Ayvalık, Balıkesir Province, Turkey. Its population is 11,405 (2022). It includes the beach area Sarımsaklı.

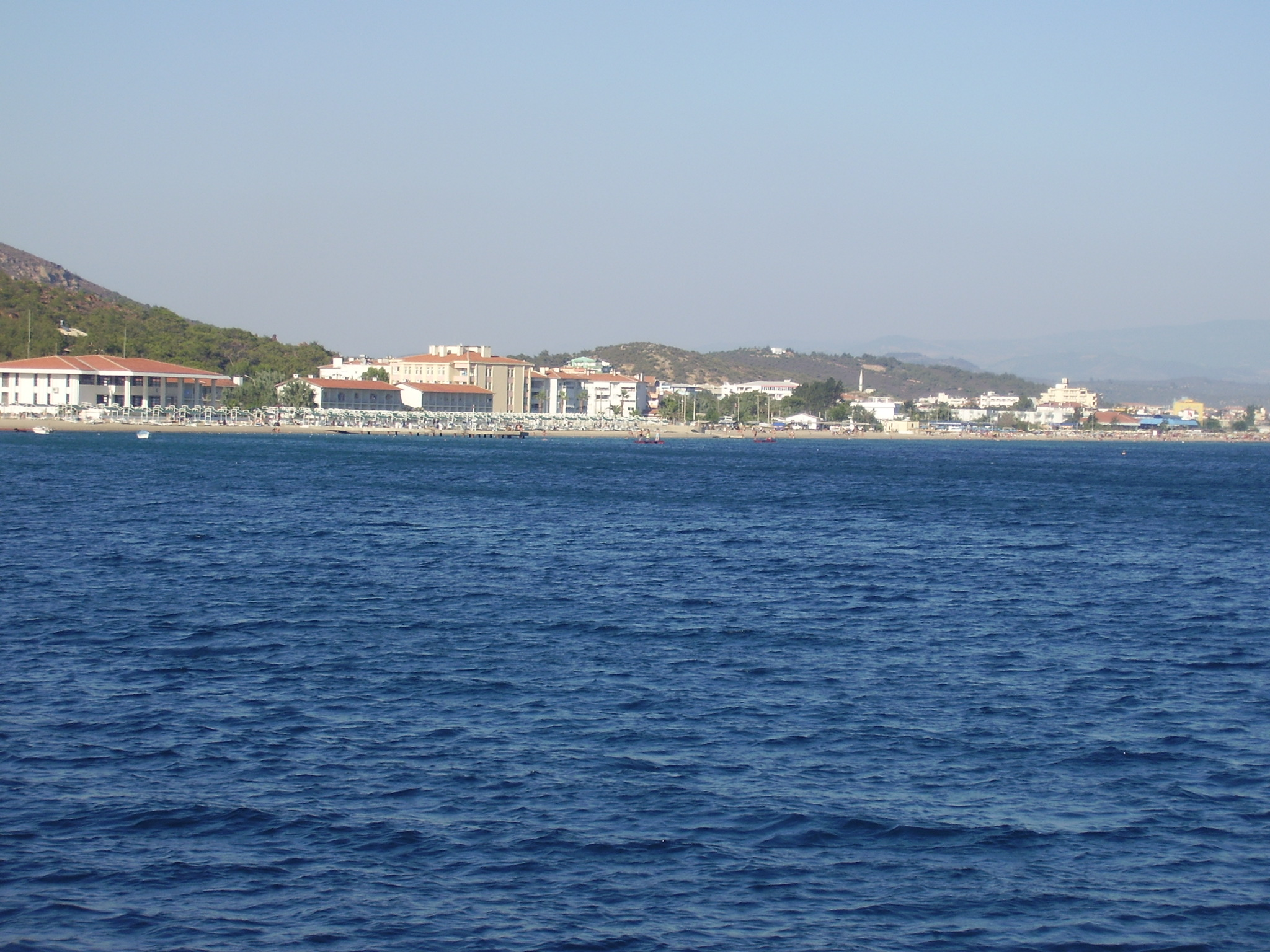
View from the Sea

== History ==
Sarımsaklı gets its name from the Turkish word “sarımsak,” meaning garlic, combined with the suffix **“-lı,” which means “with” or “having.” Historically, the area was known for garlic growing naturally and being cultivated in the surrounding fields, and the land was associated with a strong garlic scent, especially during warmer seasons. As was common in Anatolia, places were often named after the most noticeable natural feature or product of the area, and over time Sarımsaklı came to mean “the place with garlic,” reflecting its agricultural past and local geography.

Gateluzio, Prince of the Lesbos Island and a taxpayer to the Ottoman Empire, delayed his payments and Mehmed the Conqueror sent the Ottoman Navy to the island. Lesbos Island was conquered and annexed by the Ottoman Empire. For the first time in the history of Sarimsakli, a battalion of Janissary was engarrisoned in order to monitor the activities near the island and on the shore of Anatolia.

The Turkish people who arrived from Yugoslavia and Greece settled mainly in this area.

== Geography ==
The Beach of Sarımsaklı is one of the longest in Turkey. It hosts hundreds of thousands of domestic and foreign tourists every year. The region boasts a Mediterranean climate.

== See also ==
- Ayvalık Islands
- Marinas in Turkey
