= Ayvalık Islands Nature Park =

Islands in Ayvalık, Balıkesir, Turkey

Ayvalık Islands
- Archipelago
- Ayvalık Islands Nature Park
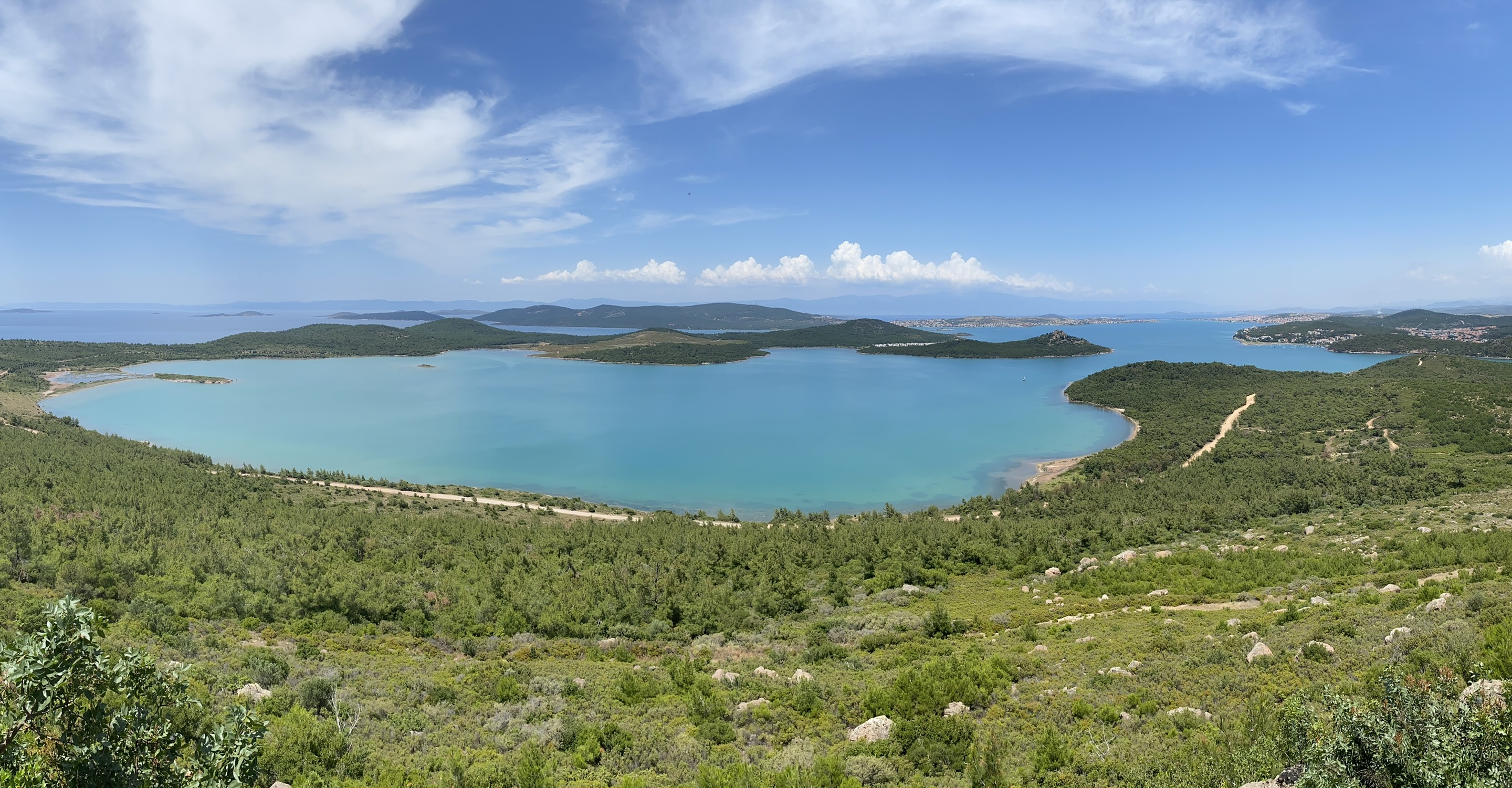
- the Ayvalık Islands are an archipelago of islands off the coast of Ayvalık, Balıkesir Province.
- Interactive map of Ayvalık Islands
- Coordinates: 39°20′51″N 26°37′18″E
- Country: Turkey
- Town: Ayvalık
- Time zone: UTC+3 (TRT)

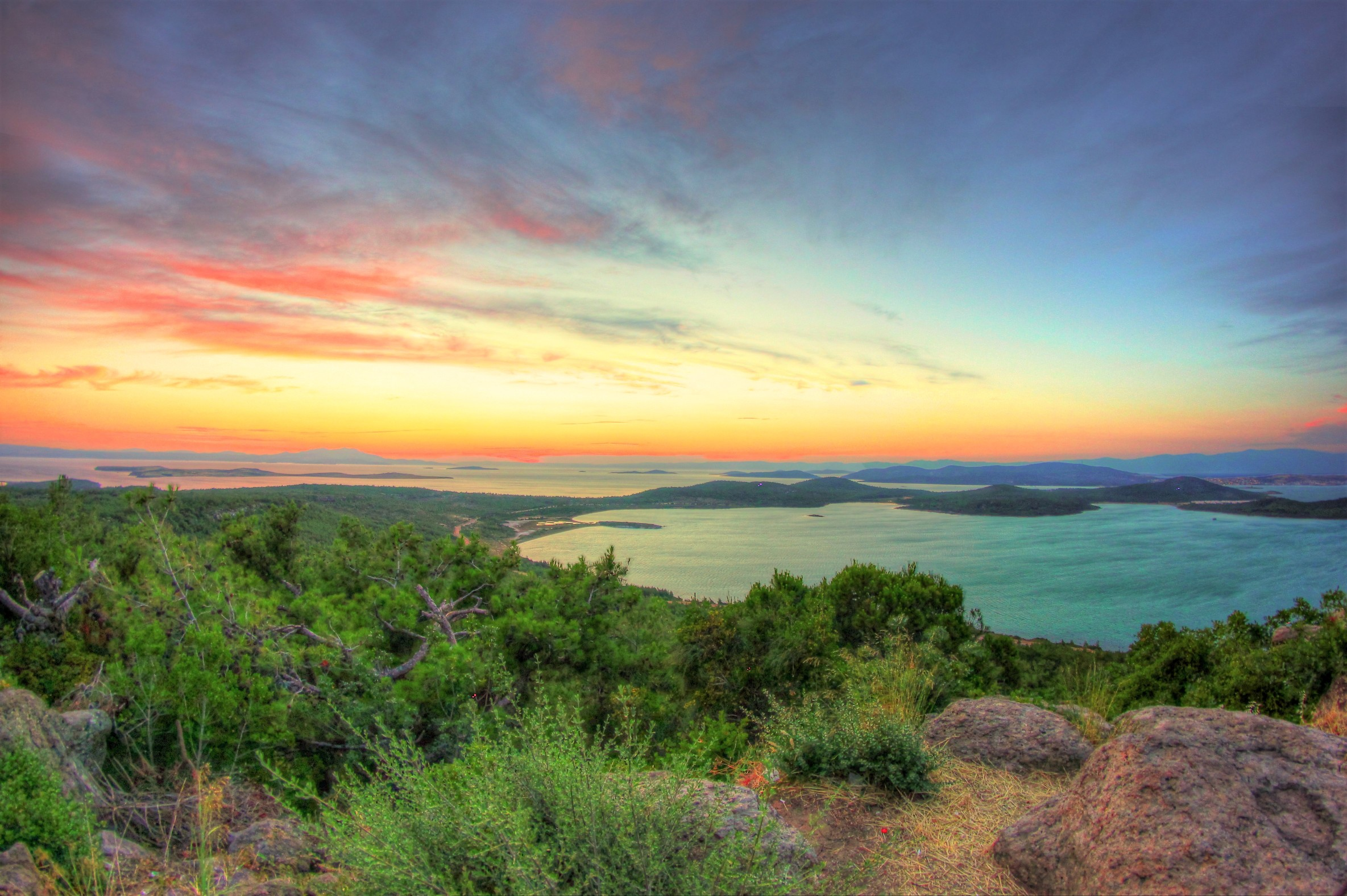
Sunset overlooking the Ayvalık Islands in the Aegean Sea, viewed from Şeytan Sofrası hill.

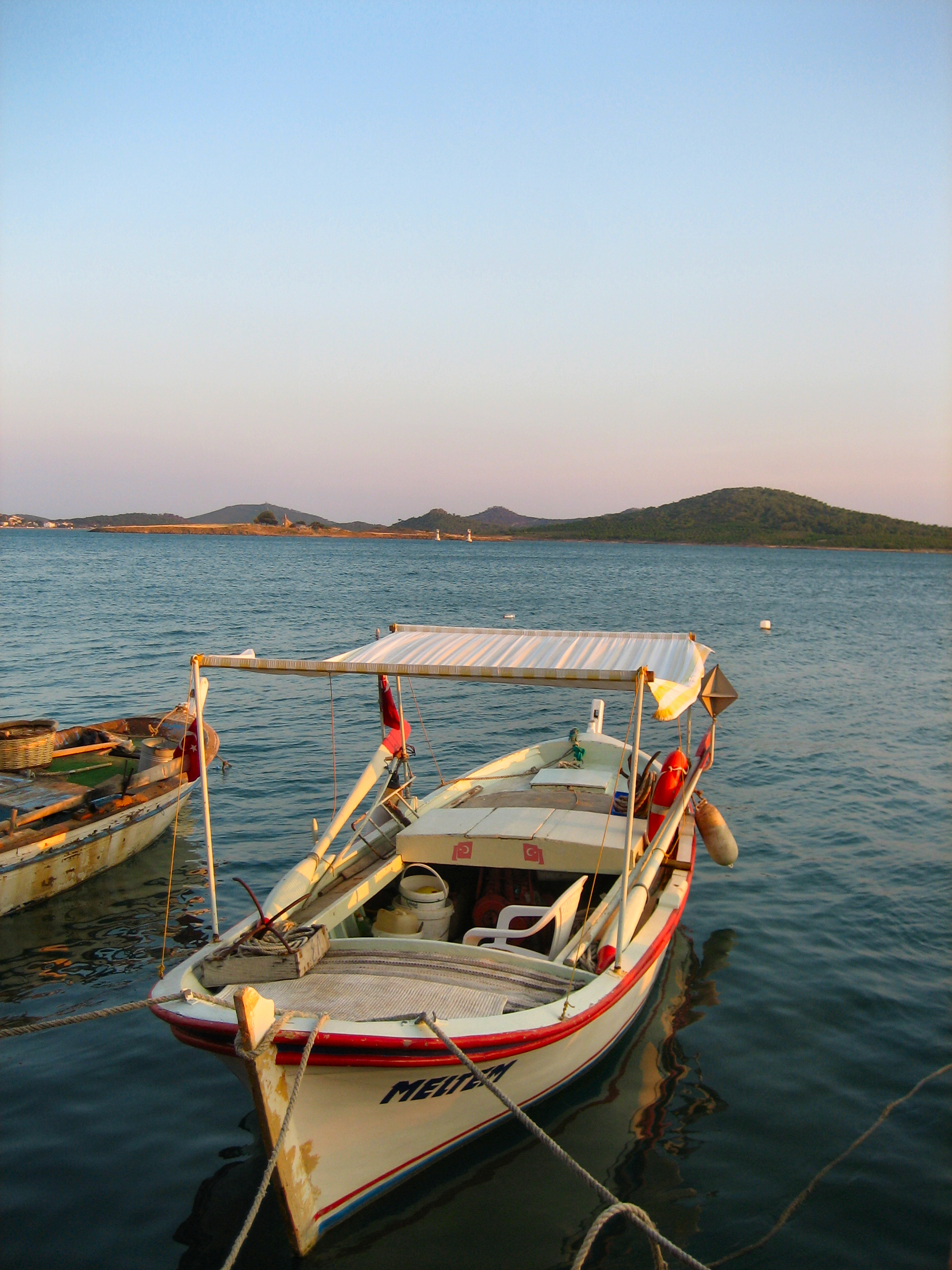
View from a fish restaurant in Cunda Island

Ayvalık Islands (Turkish: Ayvalık Adaları, Latin: Hecatonnesi, Ancient Greek: Ἑκατόννησοι, romanized: Hekatonesoi), are the group of islands around Ayvalık district of Turkey in Balıkesir Province in the Northeastern Aegean Sea. There are 22 islands and numerous rocks in the group, with Cunda Island, now a peninsula, being the largest. People live only on Cunda and Lale Islands. Cunda and Lale islands are linked to Ayvalık on the mainland, by a causeway enabling transportation by car. Cunda also has a ferry link from the main town, Alibey, to Ayvalık during the summer.

A Greek Orthodox metropolis was established, based in Cunda island, for some months in 1922.

Wild life can be observed on the other islands, especially wild rabbits on Ilyosta Island. Also, those islands are the main points of interest to tourists as having small beaches and bays.

The archipelago forms the Ayvalık Islands National Park. There’s another island off the coast Altınova neighborhood to the south. Although being geographically separate from the archipelago, it is grouped with other islands as all of them are part of Ayvalık district.

== List of islands ==
Ayvalık Islands are also referred to as Yund Islands or Cunda Islands in some sources. The islands are called in Greek Εκατόνησα Hekatonisa which means Hekate's Island, and not "hundred islands", as some have stated; they were also called or Μοσχονησί Moschonisi i.e. "fragrant island", by the Greeks. The Greek name has different spellings of the former, such as 'Εκατόνήσος Hekatonesos, Εκατόνησοι Hekatonnesoi or Εκατός Hekatos, and yet another name exists altogether, i.e., Ἀπολλώνησος Apollonesos, the "Isle of Apollo".

- Ayvalık Islands Cunda Adaları, Yund Adaları, Ay Adaları, Moshonisya, Moskonisya, Moschonisi, Moschonisia, Hekatonisa, Hekatonesos, Hekatonnesos, Hekatonnesoi, Hekatos, Ekatonisa, Ekatonisous, Askania, Ascania, Apollonesos, Apollonnesos, Μοσχονήσια, Εκατονήσι, Εκατόνησες
  - Inhabited Islands
    - Cunda Island Alibey, Yunda, Yund, Moshonisi, Moschonisi, Moschonisos, Moskonisi, Moshinos, Nasos, Nesos, Apolloniso, Μοσχονήσι, Μοσχόνησος, Εκατονήσι, Εκατόνησο, Νάσος, Τζούντα, Αλήμπεη, Απολλόνησο
    - Lale Island Dolap, Soğan, Krommydonisi, Kromidonisi, Kromydonisi, Kremydonisi, Kromido, Κρομμύδονησι, Κρομμυδονήσι, Κρεμμυδόνησο, Κρεμμύδι, Κρομμύδι, Ντουλάπι
  - Inner Sea Islands
    - Tavuk Island Aya Yani, Kilise, Dalyan, Taliani, St Yoannis, St Ioannis, Agiou Ioanni, Ayos Yannis Prodromos, Agios Ioannis, Ai Giannis, Prodromos, Prodromo, Vrachonisída Ágios Ioánnis, Άγιος Ιωάννης, Αϊ Γιάννης, Πρόδρομος, Πρόδρομο, Τάλιανος
    - Kumru Island Nisopula, Nisopoula, Ayos Nikolas, Aya Nikolas, Agios Nikolaos, Vrachonisída Ágios Geórgios, Νησοπούλα, Άγιος Νικόλας
  - West Islands
    - Çıplak Island Chalkis, Halkis, Yimno, Cimno, Gymno, Χαλκίς, Γυμνό, Γδυμνό
    - Büyük İlyosta Island Güneş, İlyosta, Fener, Eleos, Nisída Éleos, Oilios, Leios, Lios, Leios, Nisída Leiós, Έλεος, Λείος
    - Büyük Maden Island Pirgos, Pirgo, Pyrgos, Nisída Pýrgos, Pyrgo, Maden, Pordoselene, Pordoselini, Poroselene, Poroselini, Πύργος, Πύργο, Πορδοσελήνη, Ποροσελήνη
    - Göz Island Lipsos, Leipsos, Lipso, Leipso, Λειψός
    - Kara Ada Island Kamış, Kamışada, Kalınada, Akvaryum, Karaada, Kalamos, Kalamo, Nisída Kálamos, Κάλαμος
    - Küçük İlyosta Island Yumurta, Kilyosta, Eyolida, Aigialonisi, Aigia, Eleos Pulo, Nisída Daskaleió, Vrachonisída Aigialonísi, Αιγιαλονήσι, Αιγιά
    - Küçük Maden Island Adiabatoz, Adiavatos, Adiavato, Nisída Adiávatos, Αδιάβατος, Αδιάβατο
    - Yuvarlak Island Melina, Kalamaki, Kalamopulo, Kalamo Pulo, Vrachonisída Kalamáki, Vrachonisída Kalamópoulo, Καλαμόπουλο, Καλαμάκι
    - Pınar Island Kılavuz, Klavuz, Mosko, Mosko Pulo, Moschopoulo, Moschopoula, Moshopoula, Moshopula, Pera Moschos, Pera Moskos, Pera Moshos, Pera Moscho, Nisída Moschópoulo, Nisída Péra Móschos, Μοσχόπουλο, Πέρα Μόσχος, Πέρα Μόσχο, Πέρα Μόσκος
    - Pirgos islets Pirgos Kayalıkları, Βραχονησίδα Πύργος
    - Poyraz Island İncirli, Yellice, Leyah, Lia, Leia, Leiah, Licha, Liha, Leio, Leios, Lygia, Nisída Leiá, Nisída Lícha, Λεια, Λειά, Λειὰ, Λίχα, Λείος, Λειό, Λυγιὰ, Λυγιά
    - Pulakya Islands Pulakia, Poulakia, Πουλάκια
      - Taş Island Taşlı, Taşlıada, Klavo, Plati, Vrachonisída Pláti, Πλάτη
      - Yalnız Island Yelniz, Yalonisi, Gialonisi, Γιαλονήσι
      - Yelken Island Pelagonisi, Vrachonisída Pelagonísi, Πελαγονήσι
  - North Islands
    - Akoğlu Island Armutçuk, Kedi, Kopano, Kópanos, Vrachonisída, Κόπανος, Κόπανο
    - Aslı Island Asimonisi, Asimoniso, Eleusa, Ασημόνησο, Ασημονήσι
    - Gez Island Büyük Karaada, Psariano, Nisída Psarianó, Daskalio, Daskali, Daskaleio, Daskaliyo, Ψαριανό, Δασκαλειό, Δασκαλιό
    - Çiçek Island Gümüşlü, Argistra, Argistri, Angistri, Argyronisos, Argyroniso, Nisída Argyrónisos, Αγκίστρι, Αργυρόνησο, Αγκίστρι, Γκιουμουσλί
    - Gizli Island Kör Taşlar, Sklavonisi, Σκλαβονήσι
    - Güvercin Island Manastır, Mozaikli Manastır, Kızlar Manastırı, Aya Yorgi, St Giorgio, Ayos Yorgis, Evangelistriya, Άγιος Γεώργιος, Άγιος Γιώργης
    - Hasır Island Sefil, Seferi, Sefiri, Zefyri, Nisída Zefýri, Misia, Haşır, Σεφέρι, Ζεφύρι
    - İkiz islets İkiz Kayalar, Mırmırcılar, Mırmırcalar, Mırmırca, Vráchoi Daskaleió, βράχοι Δασκαλειό
    - Kalemli Island Sazlı, Oker, Öker, Kalamaki, Kalamakia, Καλαμάκια, Καλαμάκι
    - Kırlangıç islets Chelidonia, Χελιδόνια, Βραχονησίδα Χελιδόνια
    - Kız Island Kaşık, Ulya, Oulia, Ioulia, Nisída Ouliá, Ουλιά, Ούλια, Ιουλία
    - Kutu Island Küçük Karaada, Karaada, Kara Ada, Kara, Balkan, Tavşan, Kodon, Nisída Kódon, Kudho, Kouda, Kondu, Kontou, Kodonas, Koudouna, Κοντού, Κώδωνας, Κουδούνα
    - Mırmırca islets Mırmırcalar, Μουρμούρισα, Μουρμούριζα, Μουρμούριζες
    - Taş Island Kayabaşı, Petro, Petrusi, Petrousi, Petrusa, Petrousa, Petroutzio, Πετρούσα, Πετρούσι, Πετρούτζιο
    - Yumurta Island Kokkinonisi, Nisída Daskaleió, Νησίδα Δασκαλειό, Κοκκινονήσι
  - Altınova side
    - Tüzüner Island Suna, Kurbağa Burnu Adası, Altınova, Ayazment, Αγιασμάτι, Τουζούνερ, Τουζούνέρ

== See also ==
- List of islands of Turkey
