= Diocese of Tenedus =

Roman Catholic titular see

Tenedos (Greek: Τένεδος Tenedhos; Latin Tenedus) or Bozcaada (Turkish: Bozcaada) is an island, former bishopric and Latin Catholic titular see of Asian Turkey in the northeastern part of the Aegean Sea.

== Ecclesiastical history ==
Tenedos was an Ancient suffragan diocese in the sway of the Patriarchate of Constantinople (ranking third in the Notitiae Episcopatuum of the patriarchate since the 10th century, plausibly in fact already since the ninth) of the Metropolitan Archdiocese of Mytilene.

After the Great Schism the Eastern Orthodox Church promoted it to its own metropolitanate in early fourteenth century. By this time Tenedos was part of the but its location made it a key target of the Venetians, the Genoese and the Ottoman Empire. The weakened Byzantine Empire and wars between Genoa and Venice for trade routes made Tenedos a key strategic location. Although in 1304, Andrea Morisco, a Genoese adventurer, backed by a title from the Byzantine emperor Andronikos III, took over Tenedos and later, sensing political tension in the Byzantine empire just before the Second Byzantine Civil War, the Venetians offered 20,000 ducats in 1350 to John V Palaiologos for control of Tenedos, no Latin bishopric was established.

Historically documented Bishops were, according to Lequien's Oriens Christianus :

- Diodoros, confirming a synodal letter of the Council of Sardica (343/344)
- Anastasius, deposed in 431 for theological tendency to the heresy Nestorianism
- Florentius, attending the [Second =] Robber Council of Ephesus in 449 and the Council of Chalcedon in 451; in fact he was (Arch)bishop of Mytilene, who after Anastasius' deposition assumed the care ('apostolic administration') of the bishoprics of Tenedus, Poroselene (Büyük Maden Island ) the Asian coast competence of the Diocese of Lesbos, posting as his representative on Tenedos a Chorbishop, Evelpisto.

=== Latin titular see ===
The diocese was nominally restored in the 19th century as Latin Titular bishopric of Tenedus (Latin) / Tenedo (Curiate Italian) / Tenedien(sis) (Latin adjective).

It is vacant since decades, having the following incumbents of the fitting Episcopal (lowest) rank with an archiepiscopal (higher) exception :

- Giovanni Giacomo della Bona (1874.05.04 – 1880.02.27) as Auxiliary Bishop of Archdiocese of Salzburg (Austria) (1874.05.04 – 1880.02.27); later Bishop of Trento (Italy) ([1879.06.16] 1880.02.27 – death 1885.11.17)
- Jean-Joseph Fenouil (古若望), Paris Foreign Missions Society (M.E.P.) (1881.07.29 – death 1907.01.10) as Apostolic Vicar of Yunnan 雲南 (imperial China) (1881.07.29 – 1907.01.10)
- Eugenio Cano (1907.04.15 – death 1914.03.12) as emeritate; previously Bishop of Bosa (Italy) (1871.12.22 – 1905.02)
- Titular Archbishop: Evangelista Latino Enrico Vanni, Capuchin Franciscans (O.F.M. Cap.) (1916.04.15 – 1937.08.21), first as Apostolic Vicar of Arabia (1916.04.15 – 1925), then as Coadjutor Archbishop of Agra (British India) (1930 – 1937.08.21), succeeding as Metropolitan Archbishop of Agra (1937.08.21 – 1956), emeritate as Titular Archbishop of Bizya (1956 – death 1962.05.09)
- Étienne Bornet (1937.12.16 – death 1958.06.04) as Auxiliary Bishop of Archdiocese of Lyon (France) (1937.12.16 – 1958.06.04)
- Pedro Reginaldo Lira (1958.07.16 – 1961.06.12) as Auxiliary Bishop of Archdiocese of Salta (Argentina) (1958.07.16 – 1961.06.12); later Bishop of San Francisco (Argentina) (1961.06.12 – 1965.06.22), Titular Bishop of Castellum in Mauretania (1965.06.22 – 1978.05.15) as (again) Auxiliary Bishop of Salta (1967 – retired 1978.05.15), died 2012
- Giovanni Canestri (later Cardinal) (1961.07.08 – 1971.01.07) as Auxiliary Bishop of the papal Vicariate of Rome (Roma, Italy) (1961.07.08 – 1971.01.07); later Bishop of Tortona (Italy) (1971.01.07 – 1975.02.08), Titular Archbishop of Monterano (1975.02.08 – 1984.03.22) as Vicegerent for the above Vicariate of Rome (1975.02.08 – 1984.03.22), Metropolitan Archbishop of Cagliari (Sardinia, Italy) (1984.03.22 – 1987.07.06), last Metropolitan Archbishop of Genova–Bobbio (Italy) (1987.07.06 – 1989.06.16), created Cardinal-Priest of S. Andrea della Valle (1988.06.28 – 2015.04.29), (see) restyled Metropolitan Archbishop of Genova (Genua, Italy) (1989.06.16 – 1995.04.20).

== See also ==
- Catholic Church in Turkey

== Sources and external links ==
- Kiminas, D. (2009). Orthodox Christianity Vol. I: The Ecumenical Patriarchate. Wildside Press. ISBN 9781434458766.
- GCatholic – (former and) titular Catholic bishopric

Bibliography

- Pius Bonifacius Gams, Series episcoporum Ecclesiae Catholicae, Leipzig 1931, p. 449
- Michel Lequien, Oriens christianus in quatuor Patriarchatus digestus, Paris 1740, vol. I, coll. 947–950
- Sylvain Destephen, Prosopographie chrétienne du Bas-Empire 3. Prosopographie du diocèse d'Asie (325–641), Paris 2008
