= Thanos Leivaditis =

Greek actor and screenwriter

Thanos Leivaditis Θάνος Λειβαδίτης
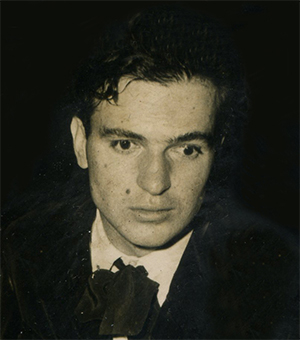
- Born: 30 May 1934; Lamia, Greece
- Died: 1 September 2005 (aged 71); Athens, Greece
- Occupation: Actor

Thanos Leivaditis (also Thanos Livaditis) (Greek: Θάνος Λειβαδίτης, 30 May 1934 – 1 September 2005) was a Greek actor and screenwriter. He studied drawing at the Athens School of Fine Arts (Σχολή Καλών Τεχνών, Scholi Kalon Technon), at the workshop class of the professor Yiannis Moralis.

In 1959, he finished the drama school of the National Theatre and worked as a playwright until 1972. He played in many roles of the classical repertoire with other actors, including Katina Paxinou, Alexis Minotis, Cybele, Christoforos Nezer, Stelios Vokovits, Thanos Kotsopoulos, and Dimitris Horn.

He entered the National theatre in 1959 with a play of Molière for Valerius. He played roles as Aemonas in Antigone of Sophocles, Neoptolemus of Philoctetes, Malcolm in Macbeth of Shakespeare, Oedipus Rex of Sophocles, Menoikea in Phoenicians from Euripides, etc.

Thanos Leivaditis also participated in international film festivals at Théâtre des Nations (Paris) in 1962 and at the World Theatre Season (London) in 1966.

He wrote 30 screenplays and played in 24 Greek film productions or movies. In these movies, he played with the unforgettable actress Mema Stathopoulou.

The next phase of his career involved television, beginning in 1974 when he starred in Oi Dikaoi (which lasted three seasons). He also starred in Oi Axiopistoi in 1981, Oi Ierosili in 1983, I Vendeta in 1987, I Ekti Entoli in 1990 and I Diki in 1991. He was a screenwriter and a playwright for his roles as the judge Angelos Karnezis and the journalist Aris Martelis.

He was awarded with the Corfiot Scenario Awards in 1984 for the serial Oi Ierosili.

He died on 1 September 2005 in Athens at the age of 71.

== Filmography ==
- Afise Me Na Zizo(Allow me to live)
- I Thissia Mias Ginekas(The sacrifice of a woman)
- O Megalos Orkos(The great oath)
