= Efstratios Pissas =

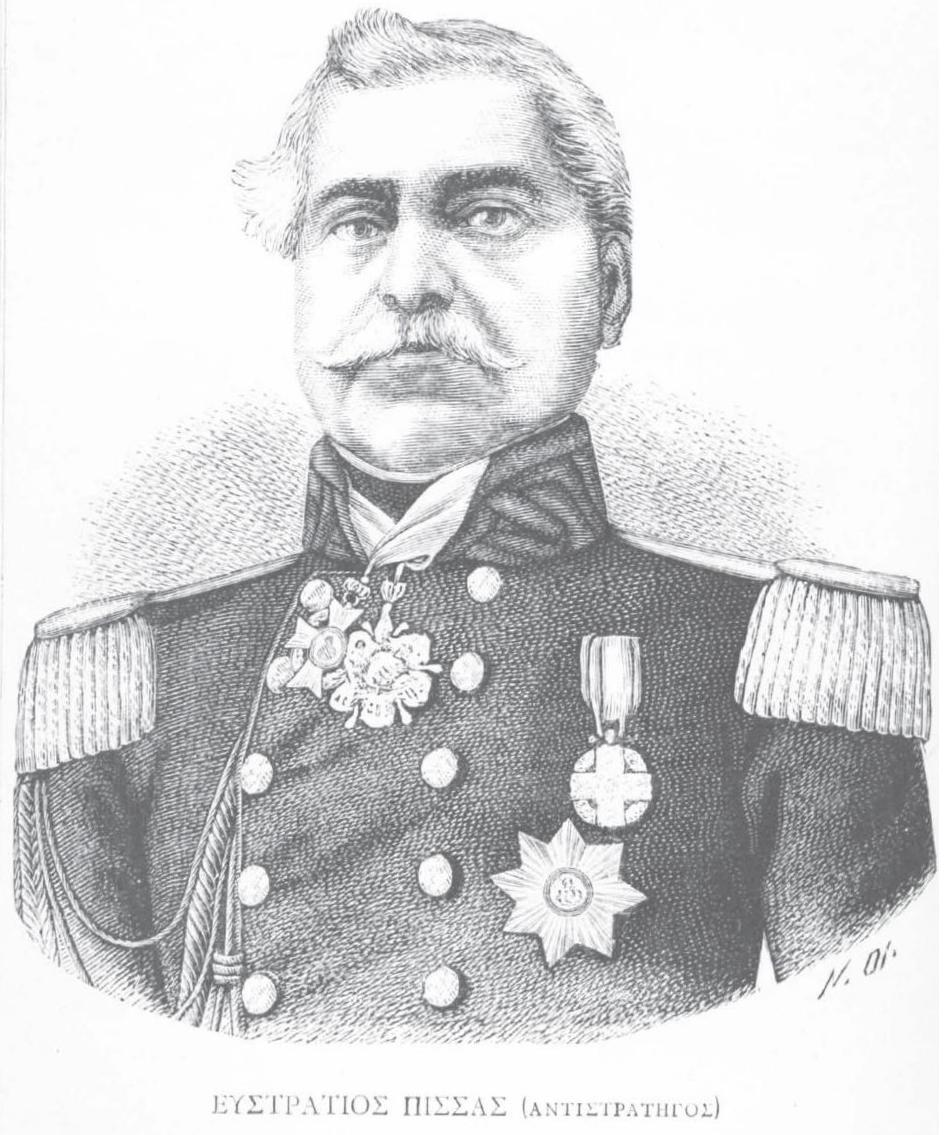
Efstratios Pissas

Efstratios Pissas (Greek: Ευστράτιος Πίσσας) was a Greek revolutionary of the Greek War of Independence and an officer in the Greek Army.

== Biography ==
Pissas was born in about 1797 in Ayvalık on the western Anatolian coast to a wealthy family. He was initiated to Filiki Eteria by Veniamin Lesvios. After the beginning of the Greek War of Independence, he immediately joined the uprising and enlisted in the newly formed regular army.

Despite his youth, he was selected as leader of the rebels' army in Crete, and took part in many of battles that took place over the next seven years in Crete, Chios, Karystos, Chaidari, Tripoli, the capture of Palamidi and at the second siege of the Acropolis.

During the 3 September 1843 Revolution he was garrison commander of Athens. In 1864, he was sent by the Greek government to take over the newly annexed Ionian Islands from the British troops. He was repeatedly appointed as a chairman of the Revisionary Military Tribunal and retired in 1856 with the rank of lieutenant general.

He died on 1 January 1885.

== Sources ==
- Ευστράτιος Πίσσας συνοπτικό βιογραφικό σημείωμα από το Ινστιτούτο Νεοελληνικών Ερευνών
- Ioannis Arsenis (1886). Ποικίλη Στοά: Εθνική εικονογραφημένη επετηρίς. Athens: Επί του Τυπογραφείου Αττικού Μουσείου.
