= Altınova, Ayvalık =

Altınova
- Neighbourhood
- Location in Turkey Altınova (Marmara)
- Coordinates: 39°13′16″N 26°47′02″E
- Country: Turkey
- Province: Balıkesir
- District: Ayvalık
- Population (2022): 15,467
- Time zone: UTC+3 (TRT)

Altınova (formerly: Ayazmend) is a neighbourhood of the municipality and district of Ayvalık, Balıkesir Province, Turkey. Its population is 15,467 (2022). Before the 2013 reorganisation, it was a town (belde).

Until the early 1920s Altınova was a village called "Ayazmend". However, during Atatürk's visit to the village, he was so impressed by the golden colour of its wheat fields, that he called it the "Golden Delta," hence, Altınova.
