= Karaağaç, Gömeç =

Karaağaç
- Neighbourhood
- Location in Turkey Karaağaç (Marmara)
- Coordinates: 39°25′14″N 26°51′26″E
- Country: Turkey
- Province: Balıkesir
- District: Gömeç
- Elevation: 21 m (69 ft)
- Population (2022): 2,503
- Time zone: UTC+3 (TRT)
- Postal code: 10720
- Area code: 0266

Karaağaç is a neighbourhood of the municipality and district of Gömeç, Balıkesir Province, Turkey. Its population is 2,503 (2022). Before the 2013 reorganisation, it was a town (belde). It is near the Aegean Sea.
