= Büyük Ilyosta Island =

Island in Turkey

Büyük İlyosta Island
Native name: Büyük İlyosta Adası
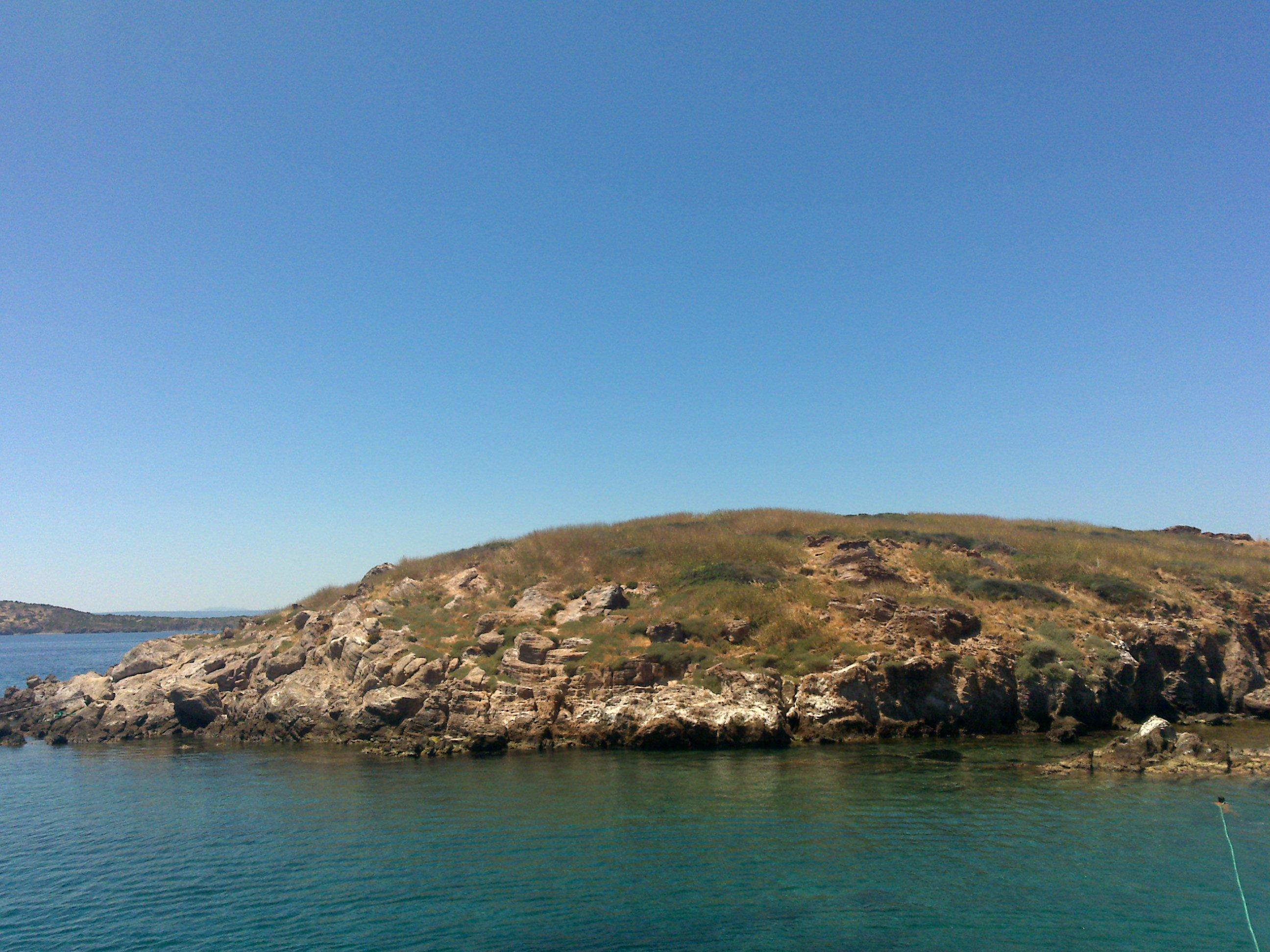
- Büyük İlyosta Island

- Location within Turkey

Geography
- Location: Aegean Sea
- Coordinates: 39°19′36″N 26°32′14″E

Administration
- Turkey
- İl (province): Balıkesir Province
- İlçe: Ayvalık

Büyük Ilyosta Island (literally "Great Ilyosta Island", also called Güneş Island ("Sun Island") is an Aegean island of Turkey. The name of the island is a changed form of the Greek name Eleos.

The island at 39°19′36″N 26°32′14″E is a part of Ayvalık ilçe (district) of Balıkesir Province. Although the name of the island has the modifier "great", it is actually a medium size island of about 1 square kilometre (0.39 sq mi). Its distance to main land (Anatolia) is about 6.5 kilometres (4.0 mi) and to Greek island Lesbos is 9.5 kilometres (5.9 mi). The sea around the island is a popular diving spot.
