= Çiçek Island =

Island in Turkey

Native name: Çiçek Adası
- Location within Turkey

Geography
- Location: Aegean Sea
- Coordinates: 39°22′35″N 26°45′57″E

Administration
- Turkey
- İl (province): Balıkesir Province
- İlçe: Ayvalık

Çiçek Island (Turkish: Çiçek Adası, literally Island of flower) is an Aegean island of Turkey. It is in Edremit Gulf at 39°22′35″N 26°45′57″E and administratively a part of Ayvalık ilçe (district) of Balıkesir Province. Its distance to the nearest point on the mainland (Anatolia) is about 500 metres (1,600 ft).

The surface area of the island is 275×10^{3} square metres (2.96×10^{6} sq ft) and it is covered with olive trees and narcissus. The ancient name of the island was Angistri (Greek: Αγκίστρι) or Argyronesos (Greek: Αργυρόνησος). According to Milliyet newspaper currently the island is put on market.
