= Nasos =

Town and polis of ancient Aeolis

Coordinates: 39°20′12″N 26°39′17″E

Nasos (Ancient Greek: Νᾶσος) was a town and polis (city-state) of ancient Aeolis. The place-name "Nesos Pordoselene" (Νεσος Πορδοσελήνε) appears in the list of tributes to ancient Athens of the year 422/1 BC but there are different opinions on whether Nesos (or Nasos) and Pordoselene were a single city or if they are two different cities. On the other hand, the nickname "nasiotas" (Νασιώτας) appears in an inscription of Adramyttium dated to 319-317 BC.

Silver and bronze coins dating from the 4th century BC are preserved. It has been assumed that Nasos was located on the island of Alibey located between Lesbos and Asia Minor.
