= Angelos Grammenos =

Greek actor, television director and singer

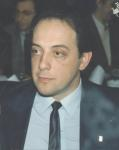
Angelos Grammenos

Angelos Grammenos (Greek: Άγγελος Γραμμένος; born March 15, 1958) is a Greek actor, television director and singer. Born on the island of Corfu, he was particularly popular during the 1980s.

Grammenos is the son of Hrysanthi and Dionysios Grammenos, a WWI/II veteran.

He studied at the Drama School of the "Professional Theatre School of Athens" (Επαγγελματική Σχολή Θεάτρου Αθηνών). He has played in many Greek films, television series, and theatre plays.

Grammenos plays the saxophone.
