= Pordoselene =

Archaeological site

Coordinates: 39°20′12″N 26°39′17″E

Pordoselene (Ancient Greek: Πορδοσελήνη) or Poroselene (Ποροσελήνη) was a town and polis (city-state) of ancient Aeolis. It was located on the chief island of the Hecatonnesi, a group of small islands lying between Lesbos and the coast of Asia Minor, which was also called Prodoselene. Strabo says that some, in order to avoid the dirty allusion presented by this name, as pordos means fart in Greek, called it Poroselene, which is the form employed by Ptolemy, Pliny the Elder, and Aelian. At a still later time the name was changed into Proselene, under which form the town appears as a bishop's see. Aristotle mentions the town in his History of Animals where it was on the extremity of a road that formed the border between an area of the island that contained weasels and another area that did not have them.

== History ==
The place-name "Nesos Pordoselene" (Νεσος Πορδοσελήνε) appears in the list of tributes to ancient Athens of the year 422/1 BCE but there are different opinions on whether Nesos (or Nasos in the Aeolic dialect) and Pordoselene were a single city or if they are two different cities.

Silver and bronze coins dating from the 5th and 4th centuries BCE are preserved. It is proposed that the small island of Maden Adası or the island of Alibey Adası located between Lesbos and Asia Minor may be the location of Pordoselene, although the second possibility seems to prevail since the archeology and the low fertility of Maden Adası does not show that there has been an old settlement there. The editors of the Barrington Atlas of the Greek and Roman World equate Nasos and Pordoselene.

== See also ==
- Ancient sites of Balıkesir
