= Gömeç =

- District and municipality
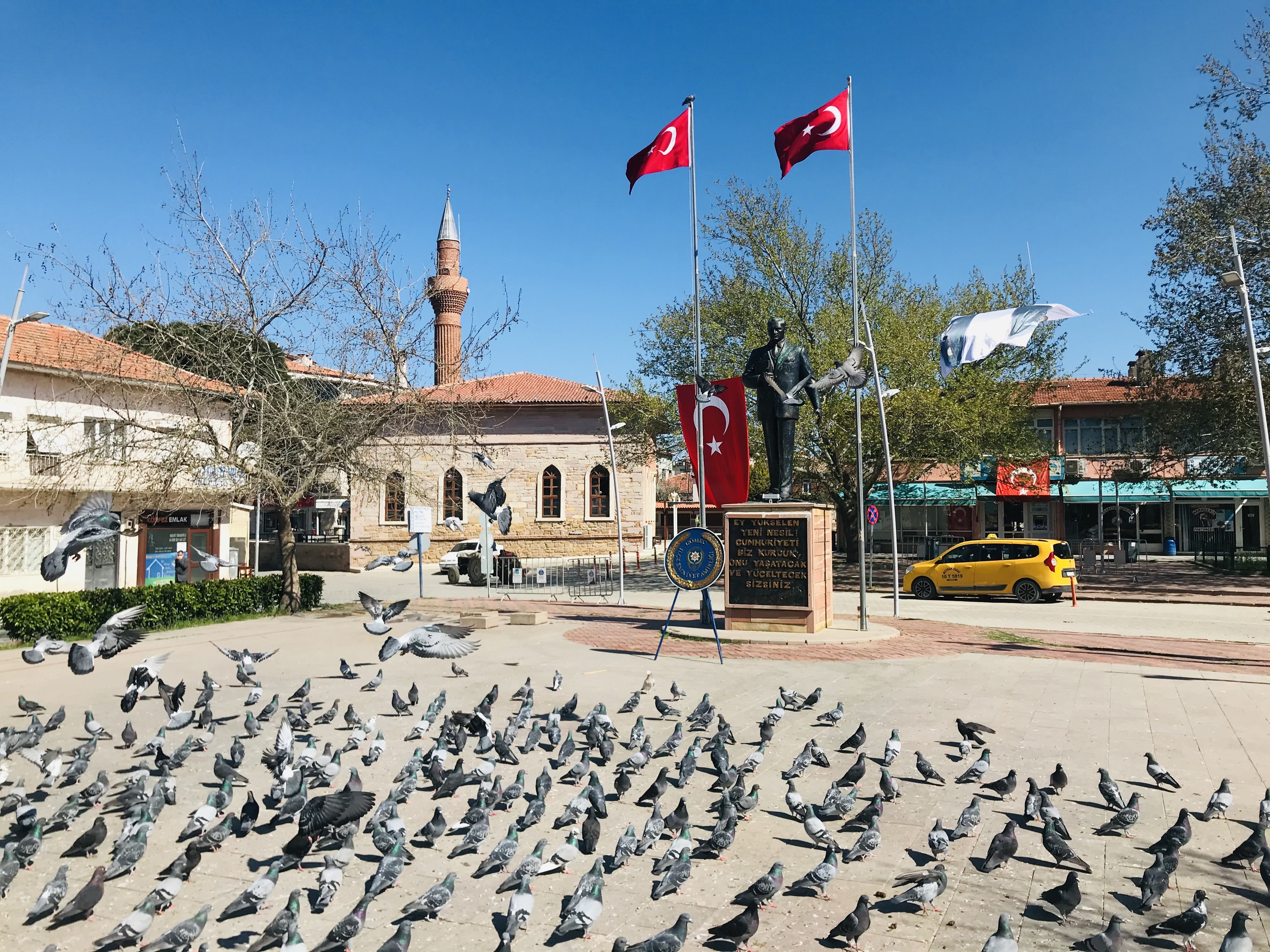
- Gömeç town center

- Map showing Gömeç District in Balıkesir Province

- Location within Turkey Location within Marmara
- Coordinates: 39°23′28″N 26°50′24″E
- Country: Turkey
- Province: Balıkesir

Government
  - Mayor: Melih Bagci (CHP)
- Area: 171 km^{2} (66 sq mi)
- Population (2022): 16,880
  - Density: 98.7/km^{2} (256/sq mi)
- Time zone: UTC+3 (TRT)
- Postal code: 10450
- Area code: 0266
- Website: www.gomec.bel.tr

Gömeç (known in antiquity as Passawanda and Kisthene, Κισθένη in Ancient Greek), is a municipality and district of Balıkesir Province, Turkey. Its area is 171 km^{2}, and its population is 16,880 (2022). Its former name was Armutova before becoming a district. The ancient city Kisthene is located in Gömeç. Current mayor's name is Melih Bagci (CHP).

== Composition ==
There are 13 neighbourhoods in Gömeç District:

- Dursunlu
- Hacıhüseyinler
- Hacıoğlu
- Hacıosman
- Karaağaç
- Kemalpaşa
- Keremköy
- Kobaşlar
- Kumgedik
- Kuyualanı
- Mithatpaşa
- Ulubeyler
- Yaya

== Twin towns — sister cities ==
Gömeç is twinned with:

- Donji Vakuf, Bosnia and Herzegovina since 2002
