= Cisthene (Mysia) =

Town on the coast of the Aegean Sea

Coordinates: 39°23′35″N 26°48′47″E

Cisthene or Kisthene (Ancient Greek: Κισθήνη) was a coastal town in ancient Aeolis, opposite Lesbos Island, in western Mysia; its mines were a source of copper. Its location is not certain, but it is generally considered to be near modern Ayvalık on the northwestern Aegean coast of Turkey.

During a survey project, realized by Engin Beksaç in 1997, it was possible for Prof. Beksaç to identify the place of Kisthene as Kızçiftlik on the Plains of Gömeç, near Ayvalık (ancient Greek Kydonies-Κυδωνιές). The site is near the sea and faces towards the Peninsula of Pryha. And by the cooperation of Kızçiftlik, it has been partially uncovered. Much archaeological data, from the Early Bronze Age up to the Late-Byzantine Period, have identified by Prof. Beksaç on the surface. According to the information, provided by Strabo, the ruins, identified by Prof. Beksaç, are related to Kisthene.

The site is tentatively located by modern scholars near Gömeç.

== See also ==
- Roman metallurgy
