= Akoğlu Island =

Island in Turkey

Akoğlu
Native name: Kedi
- Location within Turkey

Geography
- Location: Aegean Sea
- Coordinates: 39°20′59″N 26°42′50″E

Administration
- Turkey
- İl (province): Balıkesir Province
- İlçe: Ayvalık

Akoğlu Island, known in Greek as Kópanos (Κόπανος), is a Turkish islet in the Aegean Sea.

The islet is a part of Ayvalık Islands group at 39°20′59″N 26°42′50″E. It had a number of names in history such as Armutçuk, Kedi, Kópanos and Vrachonisída. Its dimensions are 78 x 57 m (260 x 190 ft) Administratively it is a part of Ayvalık ilçe (district) of Balıkesir Province .It is an uninhabited island . Its distance to nearest point on shore is less than 1 kilometre (0.62 mi).
