= Stavros Rigas =

Kapetan (Chieftain) Stavros Rigas
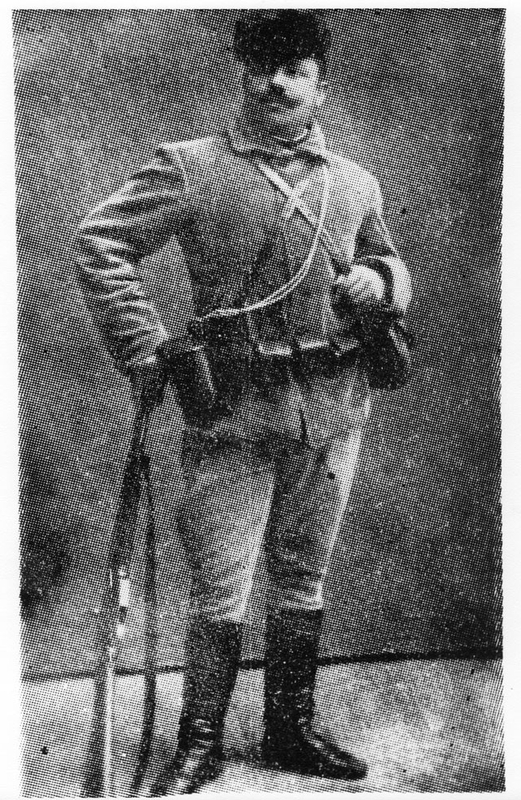
- Stavros Rigas c. 1904-1908
- Native name: Σταύρος Ρήγας
- Nickname(s): Kapetan Kavodoros (Καπετάν Καβοντόρος)
- Born: Agios Dimitrios, Euboea, Kingdom of Greece
- Died: c. 1921; Asia Minor
- Allegiance: Kingdom of Greece
- Service / branch: HMC; Hellenic Army
- Battles / wars: Macedonian Struggle; Greco-Turkish War (1919-1922) †

Stavros Rigas (Greek: Σταύρος Ρήγας), also known by his nom de guerre Kapetan Kavodoros (Greek: Καπετάν Καβοντόρος) was an officer of the Hellenic Army who participated in the Macedonian Struggle and was killed in action in the Greco-Turkish War (1919–1922).

== Biography ==
He was born in Agios Dimitrios, on the island of Euboea. After attending Hebron Academy, he joined the Greek Struggle for Macedonia in 1905, entering with his detachment the Giannitsa Lake under the leadership of Kostantinos Boukouvalas. Along with Boukouvalas and Anagnostakos he managed to occupy crucial positions in the marshes of the Giannitsa Lake and create small bases in known as Tsekri, Ali and Lakka. His nom de guerre, kapetan ("captain, chief") Kavodoros, referenced Cape Cavo D'Oro near his native village.

In November 1905 following the withdrawal of Konstantinos Boukouvalas due to sickness, he replaced him as the leader of the struggle in Giannitsa marshes. Later he was joined by officer Michael Anagnostakos. In April 1906 the two leaders were reinforced by Panagiotis Papatzaneteas and Ioannis Sakelaropoulos

Stavros Rigas survived the Greek Struggle for Macedonia and participated in the Greco-Turkish War of 1919–22, where he fell in 1921.
