= Meropi Rozan =

Greek actor (1895–1977)

- Μερόπη Ροζάν
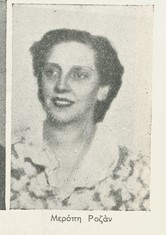
- Rozan's photograph from the program of To Fintanaki
- Born: 1895; Ayvalık, Ottoman Empire
- Died: 1977 (aged 81–82); Greece
- Other names: Meropi Petala
- Occupation: Actor

Meropi Rozan (Greek: Μερόπη Ροζάν; 1895–1977) was a Greek actor from Ayvalık in the Ottoman Empire, modern Turkey. She began her career acting on the stage and later performed in early Greek cinema.

== Biography ==
Rozan was born Meropi Petala (Greek: Μερόπη Πεταλά) in 1895 in Ayvalık. Her family later emigrated to Greece. She started performing in live theater productions as a high school student. In 1913, Rozan performed in an acting troupe led by Greek actor Marika Kotopouli.

In Greece, she performed in a number of plays. For example, Rozan starred in the tragedy Dracaena (Greek: Δράκαινα), written by Dimitrios Bogris. She performed in comedies such as Paliokoritso (Greek: Παλιοκόριτσο). Rozan also worked as an actor at the National Theatre of Greece. She was part of multiple productions with the National Theatre, including Training Daddy (Greek: Ο μπαμπάς εκπαιδεύεται) in 1939, The Great Game (Greek: Το μεγάλο παιχνίδι) in 1944, and Freedom (Greek: Λευτεριά) in 1944.

Rozan appeared in a minor role in the 1930 silent film Blue Candles (Greek: Τα Γαλάζια Κεριά), a romantic drama. The film is now considered lost. She also appeared in the 1932 film The Lover of the Shepherdess (Greek: Ο αγαπητικός της βοσκοπούλας), a fustanella film based on a play of the same name. Fustanella films were set in rural Greece and depicted an idealized pastoral lifestyle. The Lover of the Shepherdess was the first Greek sound film. The film was remade twice in 1955 and then again in 1956. Rozan also appeared in the 1956 remake, which was the first color film in Greek cinema.

== Personal life ==
Rozan was married to Greek actor Nikolaos Rozan, with whom she had a daughter. She was a devout Greek Orthodox Christian. She died in 1977.
