= Büyük Maden Island =

Island in Turkey

Native name: Büyük Maden Adası
- Location within Turkey

Geography
- Location: Aegean Sea
- Coordinates: 39°23′N 26°35′E

Administration
- Turkey
- İl (province): Balıkesir Province
- İlçe: Ayvalık

Büyük Maden Island (Turkish: Büyük Maden Adası, literally Big Mine Island) is an Aegean island of Turkey

The island at 39°23′N 26°35′E is a part of Ayvalık ilçe (district) of Balıkesir Province. It is between Cunda Island and Küçük Maden Island. The island currently is uninhabited. Its distance to Cunda island is less than 200 metres (660 ft). With an area of 3 square kilometres (1.2 sq mi), it is one of the bigger islands around Ayvalık.

The ancient name of the island was Pyrgos (Greek: Πύργος). In the antiquity there were lead mines in the island and the island was foul-smelling. The settlement in the island was named Pordoselene which had a nasty meaning. According to Bilge Umar, Strabon was uneasy with the name of the island and he used the name Poroselene instead. On some rocks of the island there are traces of malachite.
