= Dikili Gulf =

Bay in Izmir, Turkey

Dikili Gulf (Turkish: Dikili Körfezi) is an Aegean gulf of Turkey.

The gulf is named after the district center Dikili.

The gulf is mostly in İzmir Province and partly in Balıkesir Province including Sarımsaklı beaches and Altınova of Ayvalık district . The southernmost point of the gulf is Bademli, a coastal village. The distance between northern and southernmost points is about 30 kilometres (19 mi). Edremit Gulf is to the north and Çandarlı Gulf is to the south of Dikili Gulf. The Greek island Lesbos is to the west. Turkish state highway D.550 runs along the Dikili Gulf coastline.

The midpoint of the gulf is at 39°04′56″N 26°48′25″E
