= Pipina Bonasera =

Greek stage actress, director (1838–1927)

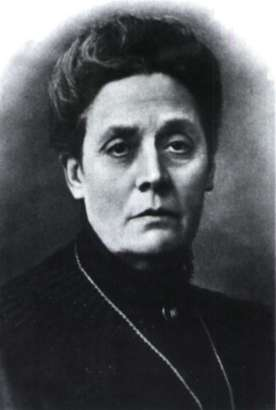
- Pipina Bonasera in 1900
- Born: Vonasera Pipina ca. 1838; Sicily
- Died: ca. 1927
- Occupations: Theater actress and director
- Years active: 1838–1927

Pipina (Iosifina) Bonasera (née Litolf) (Sicily, 1838–1927) was a Greek stage actress who was born in Italy. She belonged to the pioneer generation of modern Greek theater and was one of the first professional Greek actresses as well as one of the first female theater stars of her country. She was also the first female Greek theater director. She worked in Greek theater for fifty years.

== Life ==
Born in Sicily in 1938, Pipina's musical father brought her to Greece in 1848.

Pipina Bonasera is noted to have been active as an actress on the Boukoura Theatre in Athens in 1862, when she performed the main role in Lucrezia Borgia by Victor Hugo. She was reportedly a member of the first professional Greek theater company. The company was dissolved later the same year, after which the Greek actors formed a new company and acted in Istanbul and the Greek cities in the Eastern Mediterranean until they returned to Greece in 1865.

She became a star of the Greek theater, known especially for her roles in the works of Demetrius Vernardaki. She was also the first actress to play Sophocles' Antigone in modern Greek theater.

She composed her own theater company in collaboration with Dimosthenis Alexiadis, thereby becoming the first female theater director in Greece, and toured the Eastern Mediterranean. Together, Bonaserra and Alexiadis translated Italian plays into Greek.

== Context ==
It was not until after the liberation of Ottoman rule that the theater in Greece could establish itself; the first (temporary) theater was not erected in Athens before 1836, and the first actresses did not appear until 1840. Because the Greek upper classes preferred visiting Italian and French theater companies, the Greek theater had difficulty establishing itself outside of travelling companies in the 19th century.

== Personal life ==
Her husband was an Italian actor, Francesco Bonasera. He was also a carpenter by profession. Together, the couple had eight children; their three daughters have been described as "equally worthy actresses, Philomela, Ioannis and Eftychios Bonasera."

== Sources ==
- Αλεξία Αλτουβά: Πιπίνα Βονασέρα - Σοφία Ταβουλάρη. Συγκριτικά σχόλια σε δυο παράλληλες πορείες
