= Cisthene (Lycia) =

Cisthene or Kisthene (Ancient Greek: Κισθήνη) was a town of ancient Lycia.

Its site is unlocated, but likely on the island of Kastellorizo, part of ancient Lycia, and the home of a lovely Lycian tomb. This is because Strabo mentions in his book Geographica that Cisthene/Kisthene was the biggest island opposite Antiphellus (i.e. Kastellorizo).
