= Elevation of the Holy Cross =

Orthodox Christian feast day

The Elevation of the Holy Cross (Greek: Ύψωση του Τιμίου Σταυρού, romanized: Ypsosi tou Timiou Staurou), also known as the Exaltation of the Holy Cross, is one of the Great Feasts of the Orthodox Church, celebrated on September 14.

The feast is celebrated on the anniversary of the day on which St. Helena found the True Cross on which Jesus of Nazareth was crucified. The feast also commemorates the day in 335 AD on which the Church of the Holy Sepulchre in Jerusalem was dedicated, and the day in 629 AD on which Patriarch Sergius I elevated the True Cross at Hagia Sophia after it was recaptured from the Persians by Byzantine Emperor Heraclius.

Along with Great Friday, it is one of the two Orthodox feast days which is a strict fast. Fasting is observed for this feast no matter on what day of the week it falls.

In Eastern Orthodox Christianity, the official name of the feast is "Universal Exaltation of the Precious and Lifegiving Cross". During religious service on the feast day, a cross decorated with flowers is brought into the middle of the church by a procession, accompanied by candles and incense. The priest elevates the cross in four cardinal directions, each time repeating a benediction. The congregation says the Kýrie, eléison from seventy to a hundred times.

== See also ==
- Feast of the Cross
