= Ayvalık =

- District and municipality
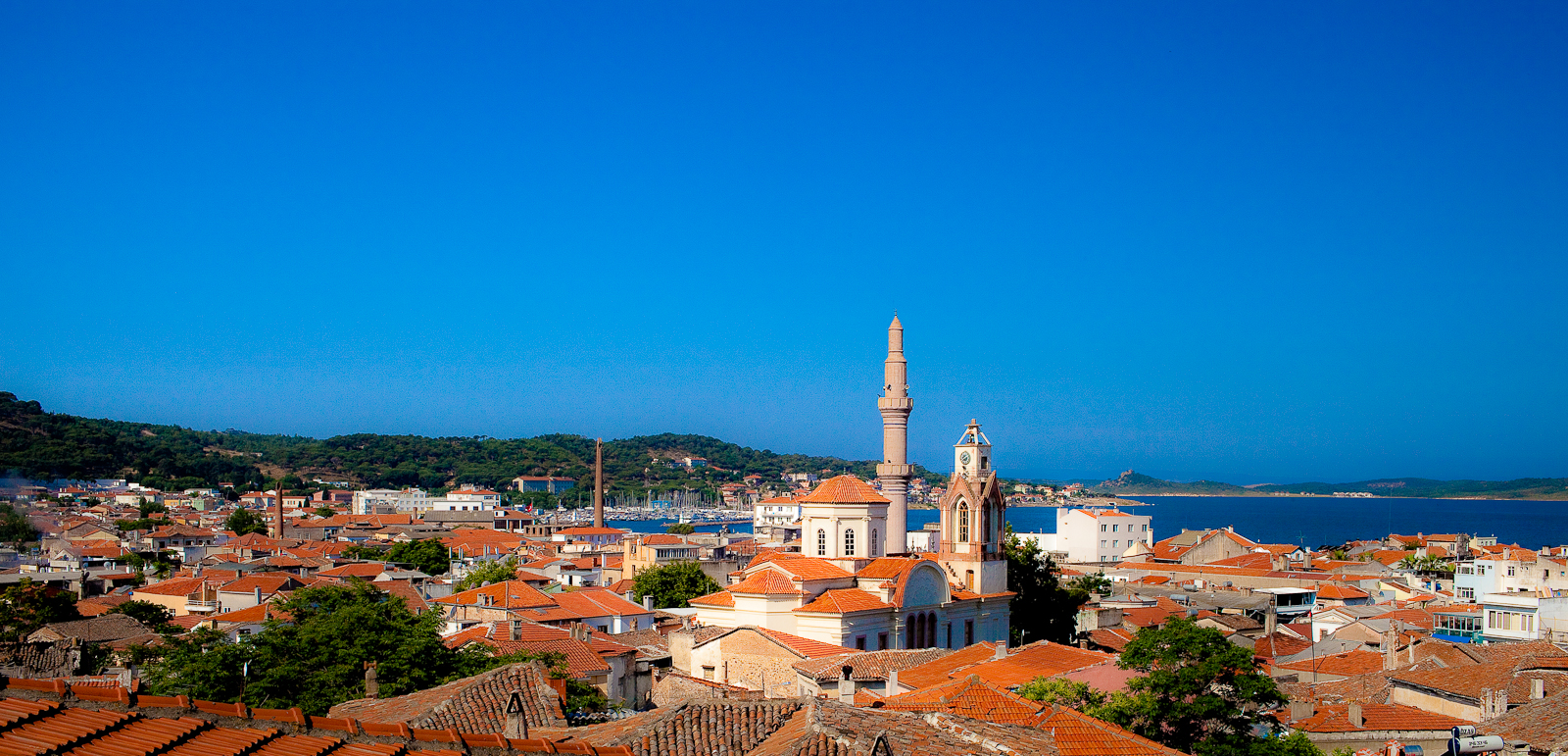
- View of Ayvalık town centre

- Logo

- Map showing Ayvalık District in Balıkesir Province

- Location within Turkey Location within Marmara
- Coordinates: 39°19′00″N 26°41′40″E
- Country: Turkey
- Province: Balıkesir

Government
  - Mayor: Mesut Ergin (CHP)
- Area: 305 km^{2} (118 sq mi)
- Population (2022): 74,030
  - Density: 243/km^{2} (629/sq mi)
- Time zone: UTC+3 (TRT)
- Postal code: 10400
- Area code: 0266
- Website: www.ayvalik.bel.tr

Ayvalık (Turkish: [ˈajvaɫɯk]) is a municipality and district of Balıkesir Province, Turkey. Its area is 305 km^{2}, and its population is 75,126 (2024). It is a seaside town on the Aegean coast in the northwest of Turkey. The town centre is connected to Cunda Island by a causeway and is surrounded by the archipelago of Ayvalık Islands, which face the nearby Greek island of Lesbos.

Under the Ottomans Ayvalık had a flourishing olive-oil-production industry and the chimneys of the old factories can still be seen about town. In modern times production has revived in a smaller-scale boutique format.

Daily ferries operate between Ayvalık and Mytilene on nearby Lesbos Island, Greece, during the summer with a reduced service in winter.

The nearest airport to Ayvalık is Balıkesir Koca Seyit Airport (EDO) near Edremit.

== Names ==
Kydonies (Ancient Greek: Κυδωνίες) was an ancient Aeolian Greek port-town. Its name was changed to Ayvalık ('Quince orchard') in the Ottoman era. Before 1923 the town was predominantly Greek, and although the Turks used its Turkish name, the Greeks used both the old name Kydonies and the new one Hellenised to Aivali (Αϊβαλί). The Greeks knew Cunda Island as Moschonisia (literally "The Perfumed Islands") while the Turks called it Alibey Island (Alibey Adası).

== Geography ==
Ayvalık is the southernmost district of Balıkesir province and lies between Edremit Gulf and Dikili Gulf of the Aegean Sea. Its centre is situated on a narrow coastal plain surrounded by low hills to the east which are covered with pine and olive trees. Ayvalık is surrounded by the archipelago of the Ayvalık Islands (the largest of which is Cunda Island) in the west, and by a narrow peninsula in the south named the Hakkıbey Peninsula.

South of Ayvalık are Altınova and Küçükköy/Sarımsaklı which have long pristine beaches. To the north are Gömeç, Burhaniye and Edremit. Dikili district of İzmir Province is to the south of Ayvalık. To the east of Ayvalık lies Bergama, with the remains of ancient Pergamon.

The Greek island of Lesbos is west of Ayvalık and connected to it by ferry.

=== Climate ===
The town has a hot-summer Mediterranean climate (Köppen: Csa) with mild, rainy winters and hot, dry summers.

Climate data for Ayvalık (1991–2020)
Month	Jan	Feb	Mar	Apr	May	Jun	Jul	Aug	Sep	Oct	Nov	Dec	Year
Mean daily maximum °C (°F)	11.8 (53.2)	12.9 (55.2)	15.7 (60.3)	20.0 (68.0)	25.4 (77.7)	30.3 (86.5)	33.0 (91.4)	33.0 (91.4)	28.4 (83.1)	23.1 (73.6)	17.7 (63.9)	13.3 (55.9)	22.1 (71.8)
Daily mean °C (°F)	7.9 (46.2)	8.7 (47.7)	11.1 (52.0)	14.9 (58.8)	19.9 (67.8)	24.7 (76.5)	27.3 (81.1)	27.3 (81.1)	22.9 (73.2)	18.2 (64.8)	13.3 (55.9)	9.5 (49.1)	17.2 (63.0)
Mean daily minimum °C (°F)	4.7 (40.5)	5.2 (41.4)	7.0 (44.6)	10.4 (50.7)	14.8 (58.6)	19.3 (66.7)	22.0 (71.6)	22.3 (72.1)	18.2 (64.8)	14.1 (57.4)	9.7 (49.5)	6.4 (43.5)	12.9 (55.2)
Average precipitation mm (inches)	101.8 (4.01)	99.51 (3.92)	60.27 (2.37)	45.97 (1.81)	25.67 (1.01)	13.96 (0.55)	2.68 (0.11)	2.89 (0.11)	20.07 (0.79)	64.76 (2.55)	102.86 (4.05)	114.8 (4.52)	655.24 (25.80)
Average precipitation days (≥ 1.0 mm)	8.1	7.6	6.4	5.2	3.6	2.1	1.8	1.0	2.7	4.1	6.7	9.2	58.5
Average relative humidity (%)	75.7	74.5	71.8	69.2	65.7	60.7	57.6	58.8	64.6	71.9	75.9	76.5	68.5
Mean monthly sunshine hours	102.6	122.7	185.9	231.6	296.9	345.0	379.1	356.9	276.4	199.6	126.8	85.9	2,709.2
Source: NOAA

== History ==
=== Prehistory and classical antiquity ===
Archeological studies in the region have shown that Ayvalık and its environs were inhabited in the prehistoric era. Joseph Thacher Clarke believed that he had identified Ayvalık as the site of Kisthene, which was mentioned by Strabo as a ruinous place beside a harbour beyond Cape Pyrrha. However, Engin Beksaç of Trakya University preferred to site Kisthene at Kız Çiftlik, near the centre of Gömeç.

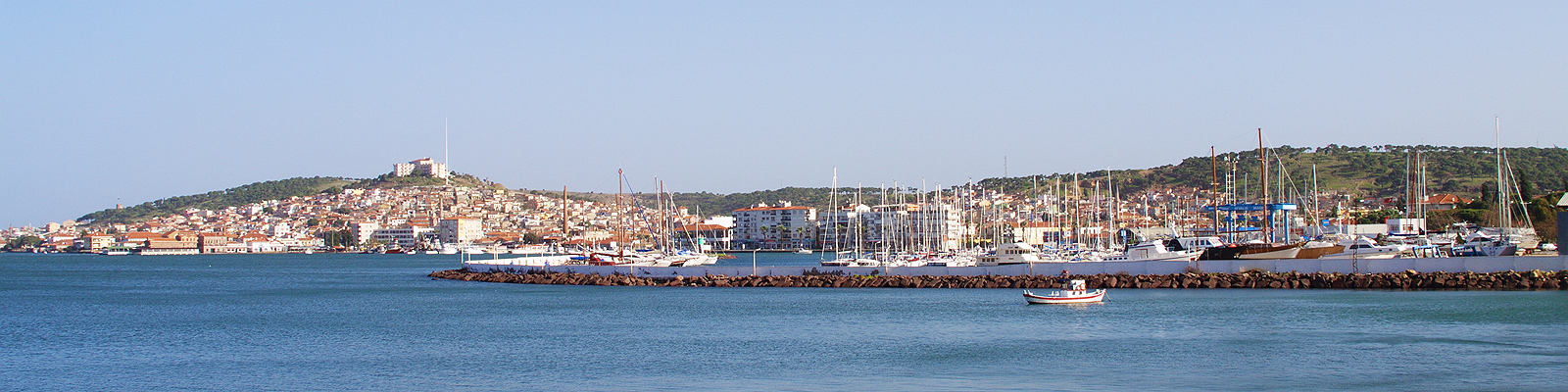
Panoramic view of Ayvalık's town centre.

In his survey of the prehistoric and protohistoric settlements on the southern side of the Gulf of Adramytteion (Edremit) carried out in the 1990s and early 2000s, Beksaç studied the Ayvalık region. The survey identified several different settlements near the centre of Ayvalık which appear to relate to the Early Classical period. However, some settlements near the centre of Altınova were related to the prehistoric period, especially the Bronze and Iron Ages. Kortukaya was identified in the survey as one of the most important settlements in the area and one that aids in the understanding of the interaction between the peoples of the interior and of the coast. The same is true of Yeni Yeldeğirmeni, another settlement near the centre of Altınova.

Beksaç identified traces of a hill fort on Çıplak Island (Chalkys). Some Late Bronze Age and Early Iron Age pottery fragments related to the Aeolians were also found here. Two tiny settlements, near the centre of Ayvalık, formed part of the peraia of Mytilene.

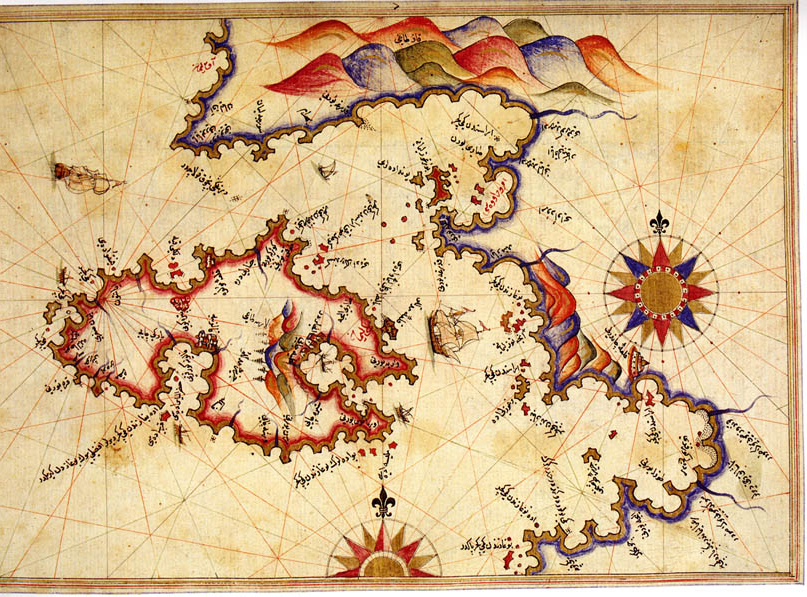
Historic map of Ayvalık by Piri Reis.

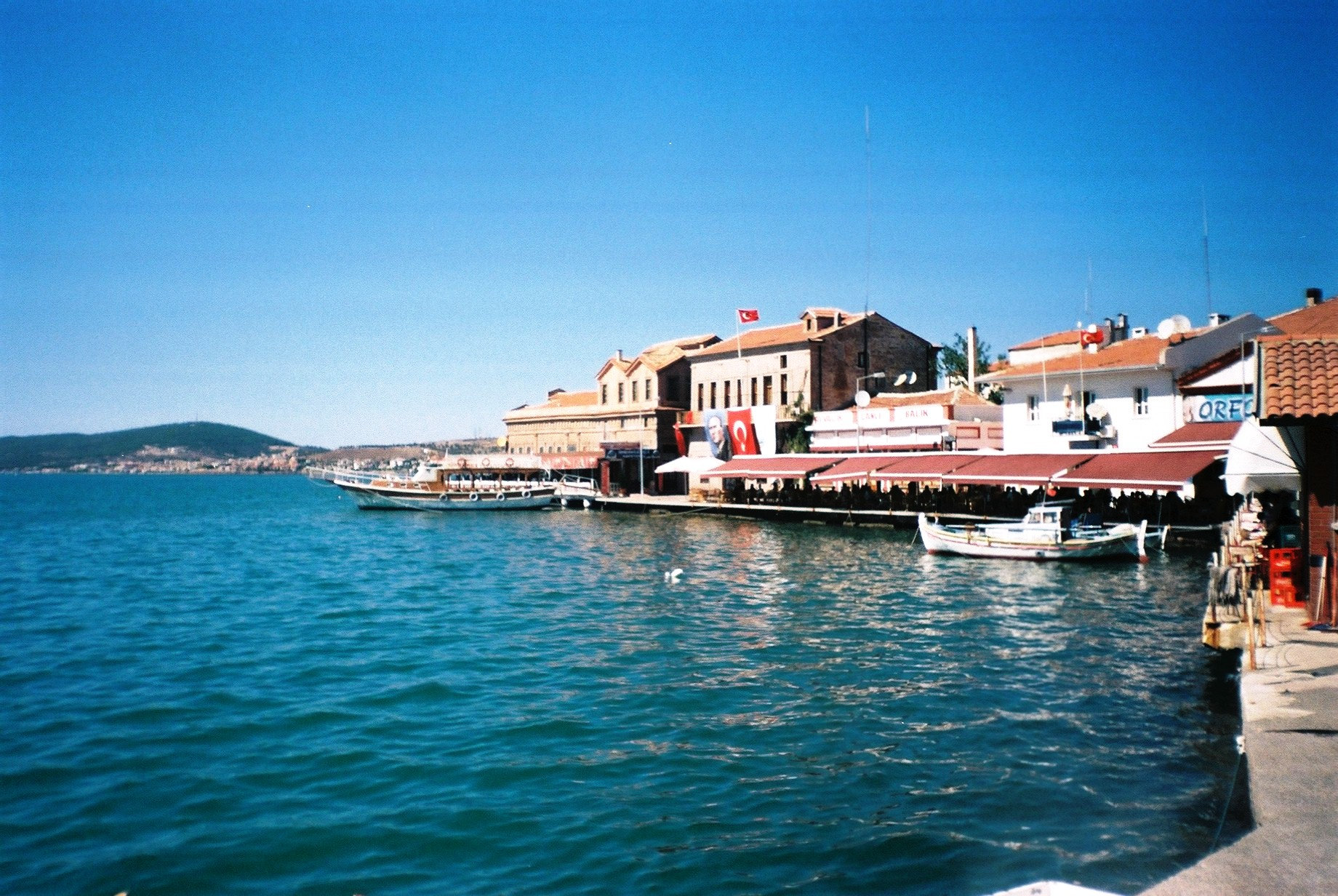
Seafront with old Greek houses in Ayvalık harbour.

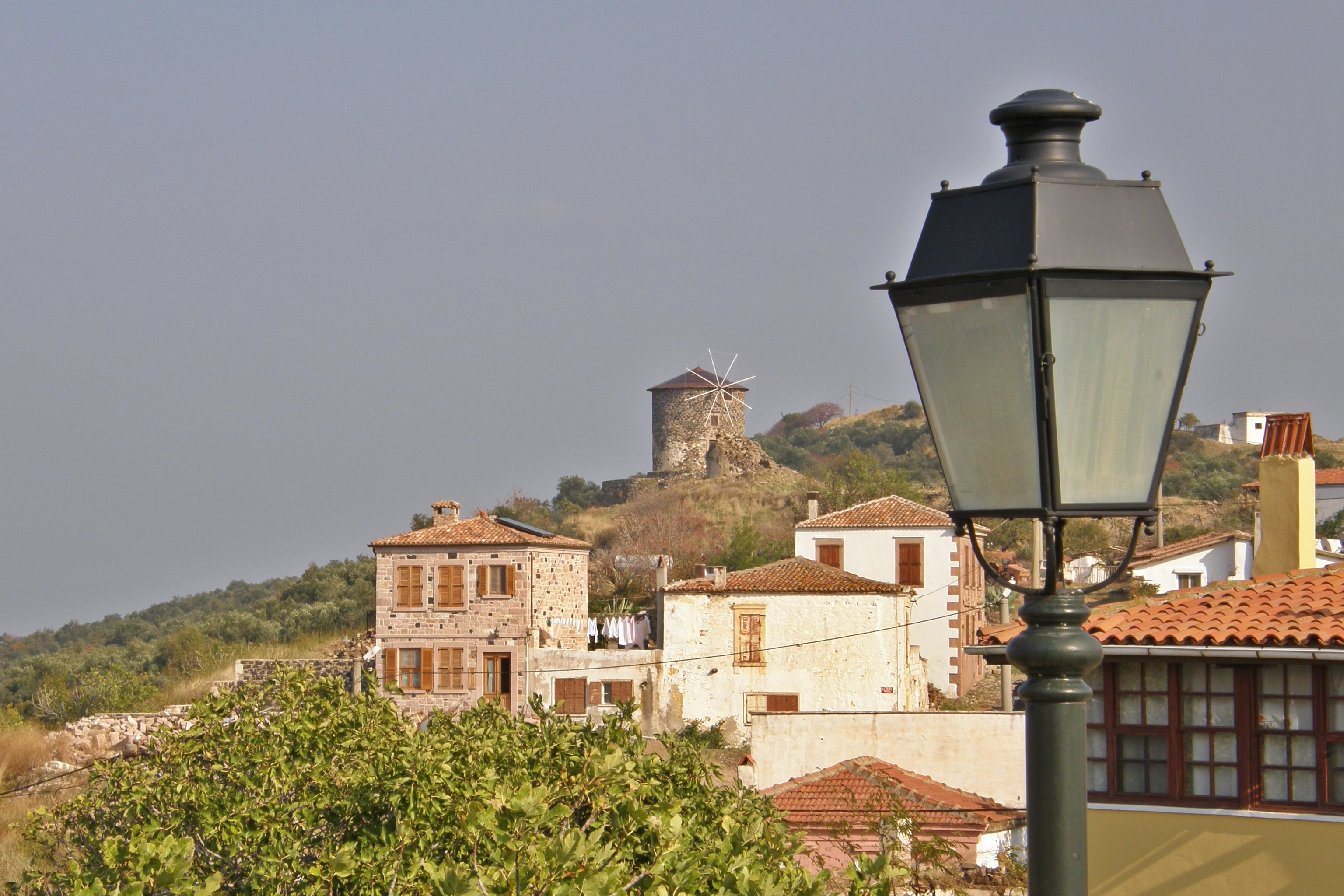
Houses on Cunda Island, the largest of the Ayvalık Islands.

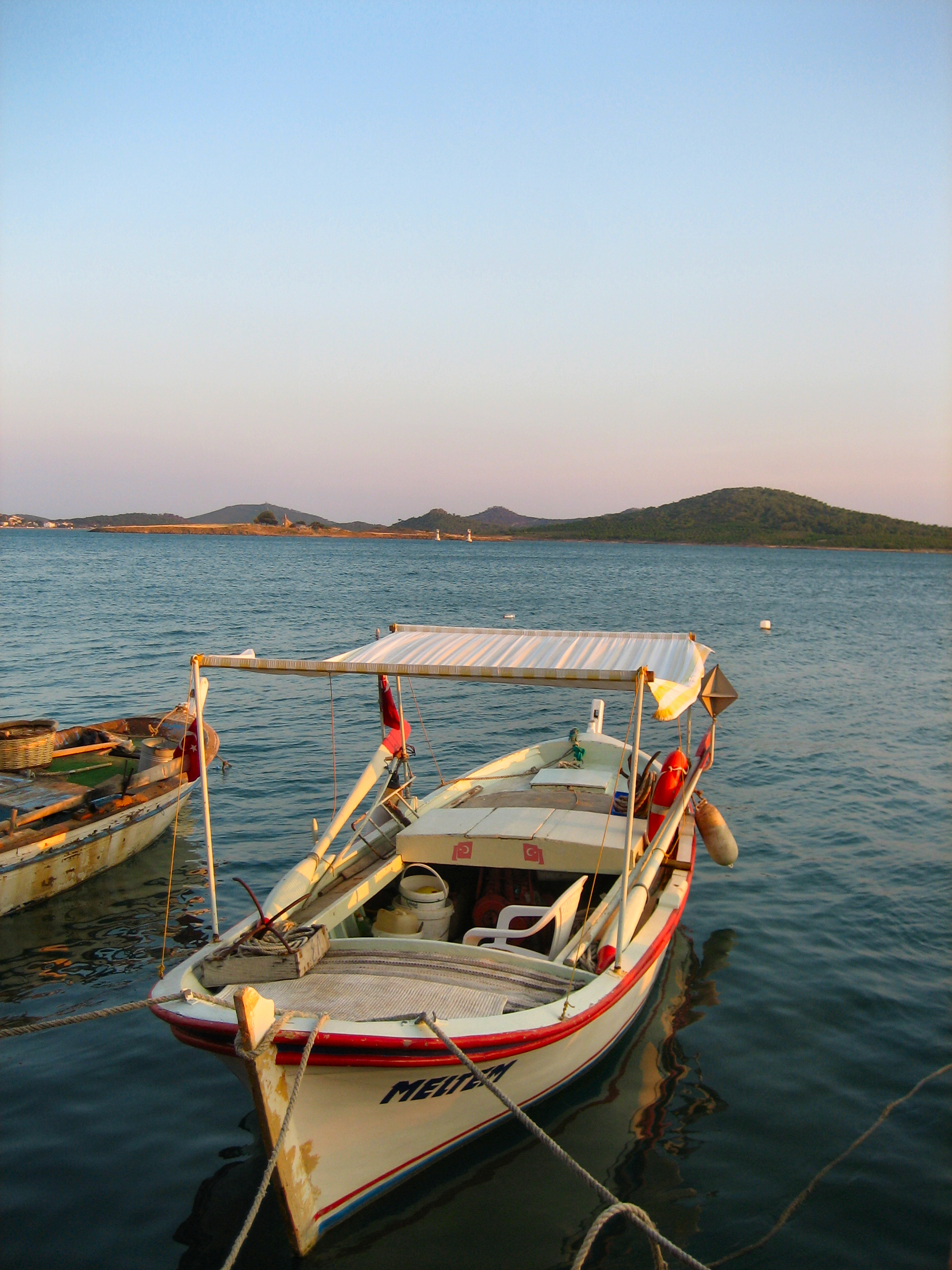
View from fish restaurant in harbour of Cunda Island.

Pordoselene, on the eastern side of Cunda Island, near the sea, was another important settlement in Antiquity. All the archaeological data was related to the Classical and Medieval Ages.

During the Byzantine period, the constant threat posed by Arab and Turkish piracy prevented the islet settlements from growing larger. Only Cunda Island could maintain a higher level of habitation as it is the largest and the closest islet to the mainland.

=== Early Turkish periods ===
After the Byzantine period, the region came under the rule of the Anatolian beylik of Karasi in the 13th century. Later it was annexed to the territory of the Ottoman beylik (principality), which would become the Ottoman Empire.

=== 1770 Battle of Çeşme and aftermath ===
In 1770 the Ottoman navy suffered a major defeat against the Russians at Çeşme. The Ottoman admiral Cezayirli Gazi Hasan Pasha and the men who survived the disaster were lodged on their way back to the capital Constantinople by an Ayvalık priest. Hasan Pasha did not forget the kindness shown to his sailors in their hour of need, and when he became Grand Vizier, he granted virtual autonomy to the Greeks of Ayvalık in 1773, paving the way for it to become an important centre of cultures for that community during the late 18th, 19th and early 20th centuries. Until 1922 Ayvalık remained an almost entirely Greek settlement.

=== 1821 Greek struggle for independence ===
The then British Ambassador Lord Strangford reported that Osman Pasha accepted the submission of the Aivaliotes, until he could get fresh instructions from Constantinople. However a squadron of Greek insurgents appeared, persuading the inhabitants to hope that it had come to their rescue, and that another revolt might meet with greater success. They accordingly rose en masse, and about fifteen hundred Turks were killed. But the appearance of the squadron turned out to have been merely accidental and it soon sailed away. The Turks then recovered their courage, and an indiscriminate massacre of the Greeks followed.

In 1891, there were 21,666 Greeks and 180 Turks living in the town of Ayvalık.

=== World War I and its aftermath ===
As of 1920, Ayvalık's population was estimated at 60,000. Its small port was used to export soap, olive oil, animal hides and flour. The British described Aivali (Ayvalık) and nearby Edremid (Edremit) as having the finest olive oil in Asia Minor and reported large exports of it to France and Italy. This industry suffered during the First World War due to the deportation of the local Christian population (some of whom fled to the nearby Greek islands), who were the main producers of olive oil. Alarmed at the decline of the industry, the Turkish government brought back 4,500 Greek families in order to resume olive oil production. But although these repatriated Greeks were paid wages, they were not allowed to live in their own homes and were kept under official surveillance

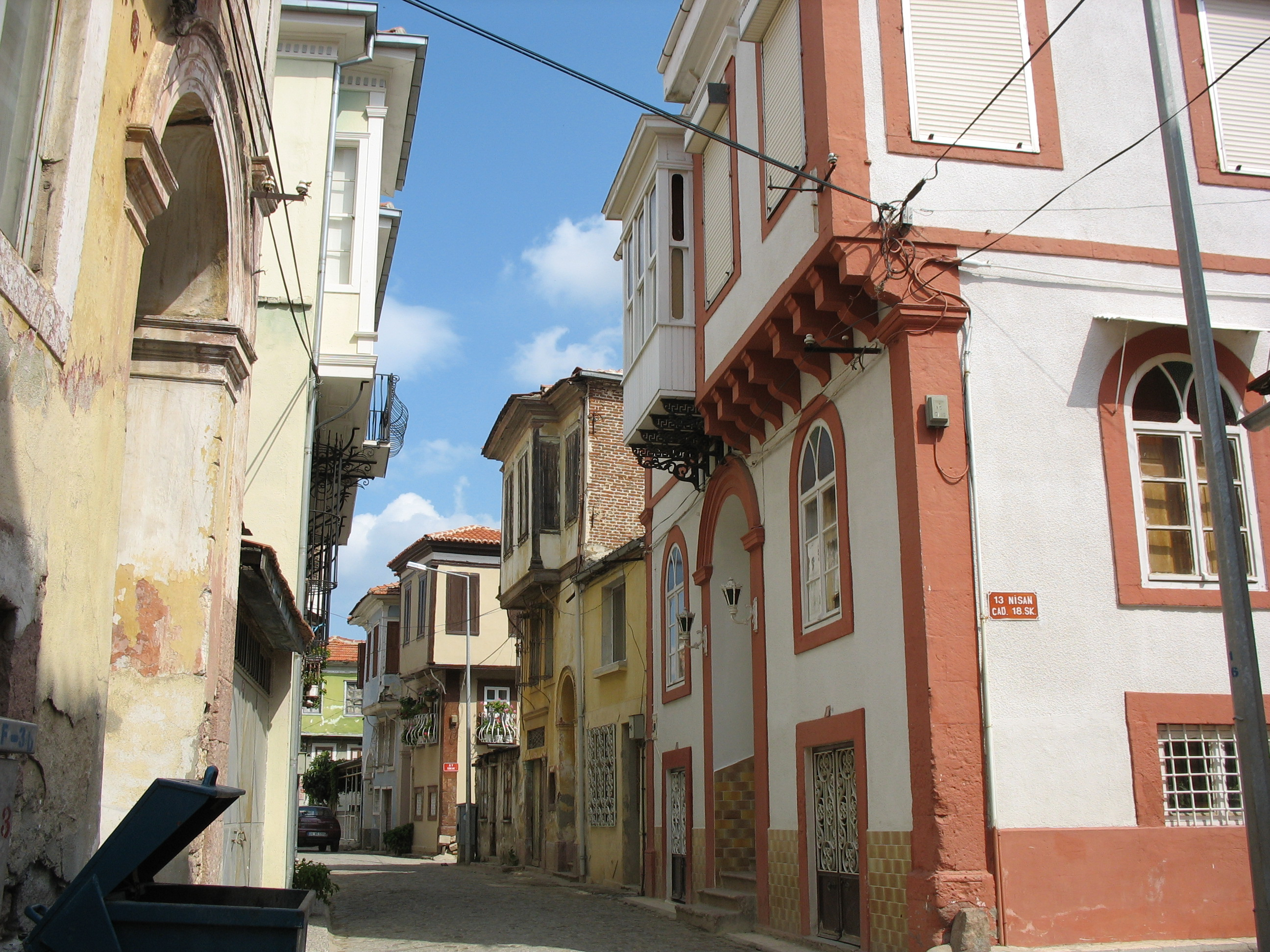
Ottoman era Greek houses in Ayvalık.

On 29 May 1919 the town was occupied by the Greek Army, only to be reoccupied by the Turkish forces under the command of Mustafa Kemal Atatürk on 15 September 1922. Some of the population managed to escape to Greece. However, many of the local men were seized by the Turkish Army and died on death marches into the interior of Anatolia. Among the victims were the Christian clergy and the local metropolitan bishop, Gregory Orologas, as well as the novelist Elias Venezis, who was one of the few to survive and wrote about his experience in his book Number 31328.

Following the Turkish War of Independence, the Greek population and their properties in the town were exchanged for a Muslim population from Greece, and other formerly held Ottoman Turkish lands, under the 1923 agreement for the Exchange of populations between Greece and Turkey. Most of the new population consisted of Greek Muslims from Mytilene (Lesbos), Crete and Macedonia, while the surviving Greeks of Ayvalik settled in Lesbos and Aigaleo, Greece. Until recently Greek could still be heard being spoken in the streets. Many of the town's older mosques are Greek Orthodox churches that have been given a new use.

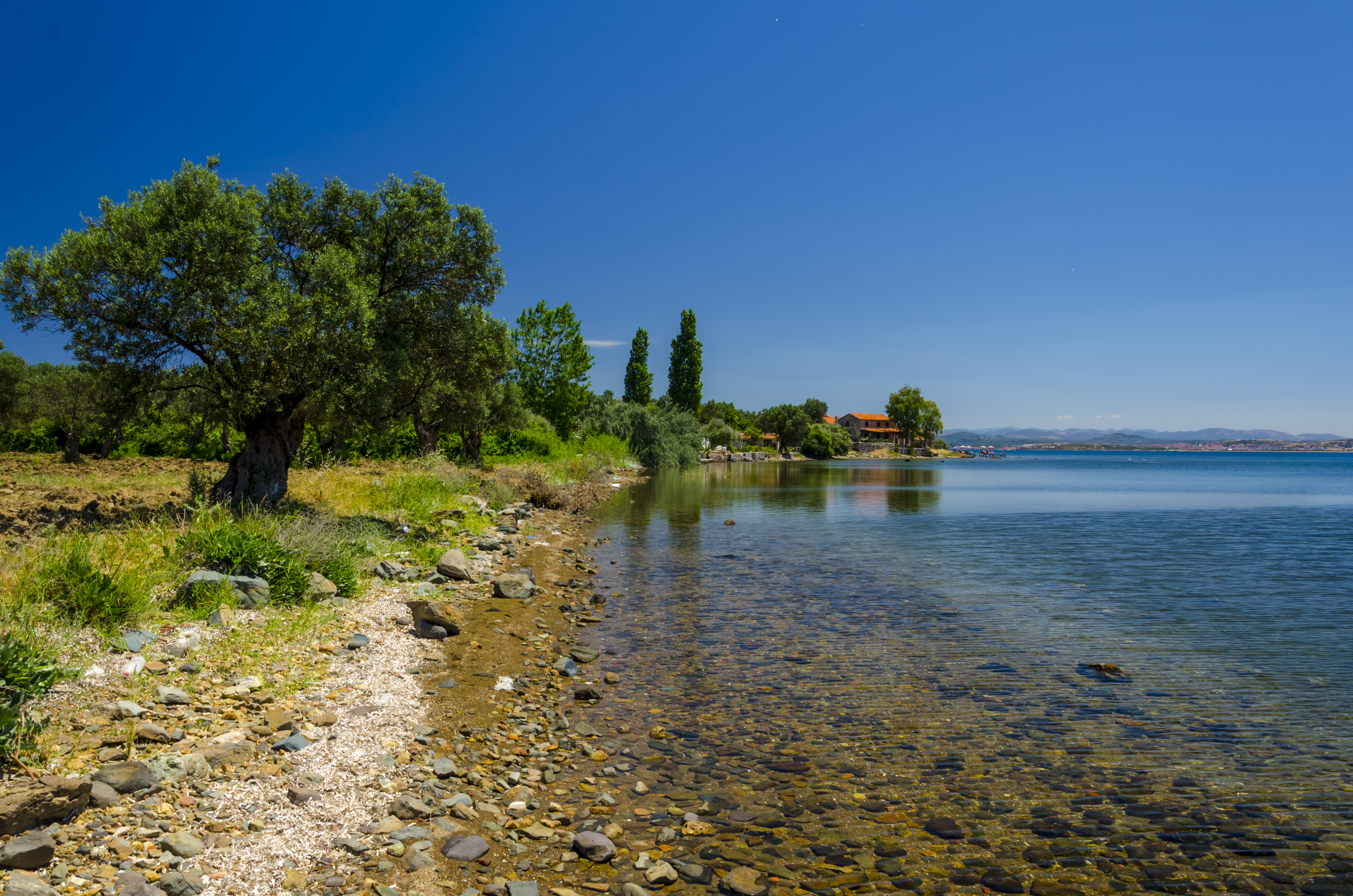
Paterica Cove

== Modern Ayvalık ==
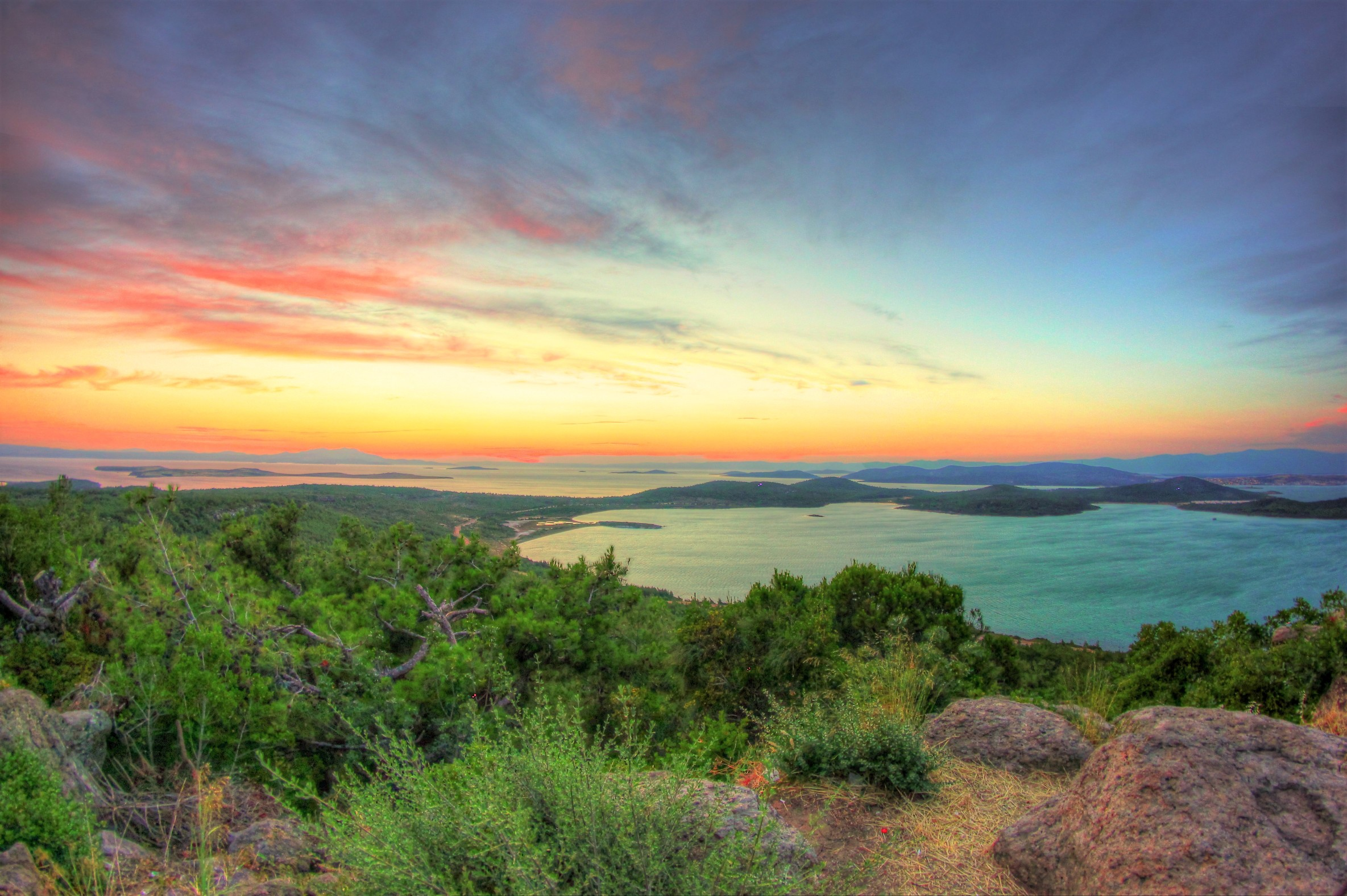
Ayvalık Islands from Şeytan Sofrası ('Satan's Dinner Table') hill.

Today, the population of Ayvalık is close to 80,000, which significantly increases during the summer due to tourism. Ayvalık and its environs are famous for high quality olive oil production, which provides an important source of income for the local population. Ayvalık and the numerous islets encircling the bay area are popular holiday resorts. The largest and most important of these islets is Cunda Island (Alibey Island) which is connected to Lale Island, and thence to the mainland, by a bridge and causeway built in the late 1960s. This was the first bridge in Turkey to connect lands separated by a strait. Both Ayvalık and Cunda Island are famous for their seafood restaurants which line the seashore.

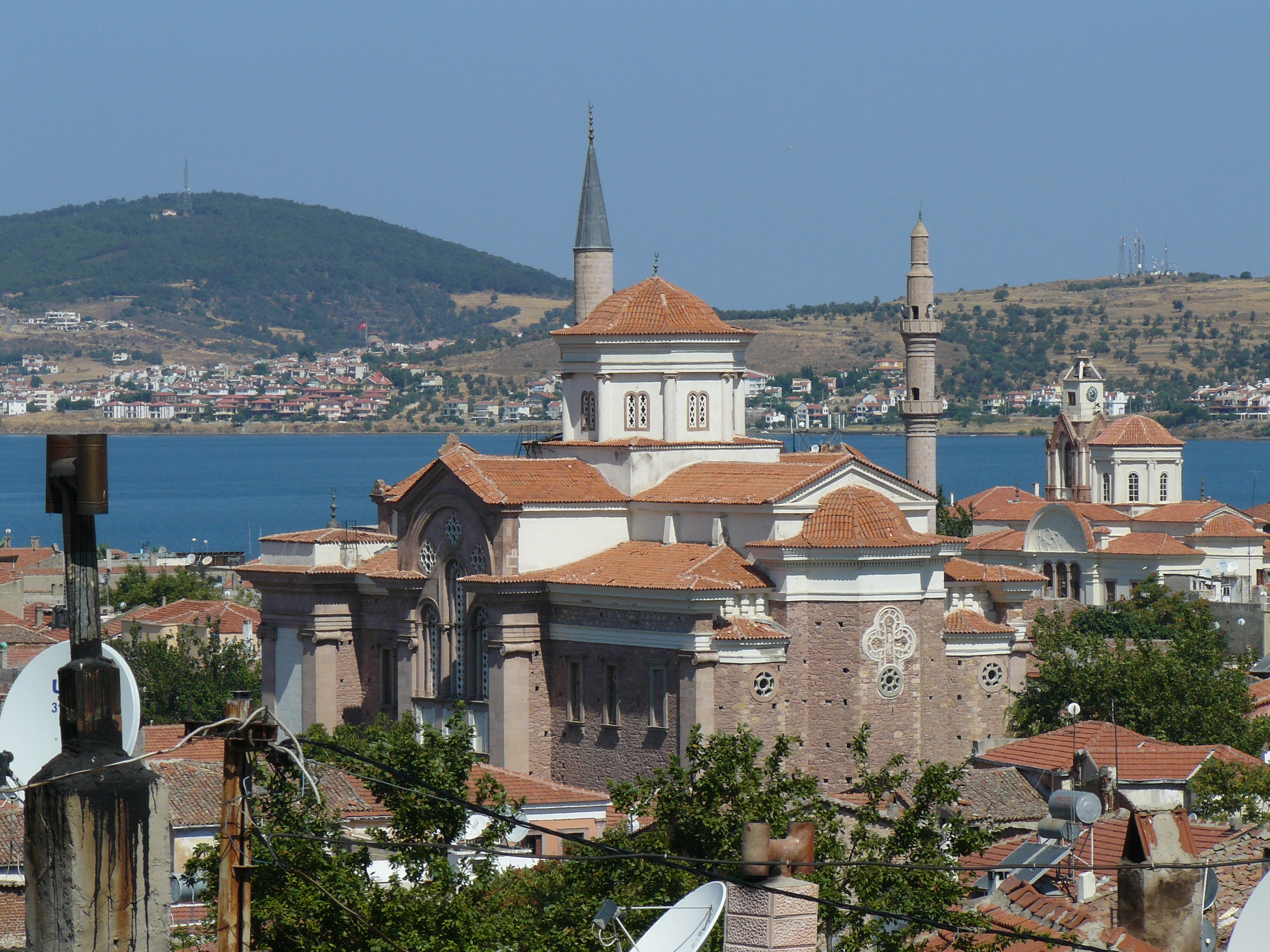
Two former churches (now mosques) in historic centre of Ayvalık.

Ayvalık also has two of the longest sandy beaches – Sarımsaklı and Altınova beaches – in Turkey which extend as far as the Dikili district of İzmir nearly 30 km (19 mi) to the south. In recent years, Ayvalık has also become increasingly attractive to scuba divers.

Ayvalık International Music Academy (AIMA) was established in September 1998. Students receive master-instructed classes for violin, viola and cello.

USA-based Harvard University and Turkey's Koç University run a Harvard-Koç University Intensive Ottoman & Turkish Summer School on Cunda Island every summer.

Ayvalık is also a member of the Norwich-based European Association of Historic Towns and Regions (EAHTR).

== Composition ==
There are 34 neighbourhoods in Ayvalık District:

- 150 Evler
- Akçapınar
- Ali Çetin Kaya
- Altınova
- Bağyüzü
- Beşiktepe
- Bulutçeşme
- Çakmak
- Çamoba
- Fethiye
- Fevzipaşa-Vehbibey
- Gazi Kemal Paşa
- Hacıveliler
- Hamdibey
- Hayrettinpaşa
- İsmetpaşa
- Karaayıt
- Kazım Karabekir
- Kırcalar
- Küçükköy
- Mithatpaşa
- Murateli
- Mutlu
- Namıkkemal
- Odaburnu
- Sahilkent
- Sakarya
- Sefaçamlık
- Tıfıllar
- Türközü
- Üçkabaağaç
- Yeniköy
- Yenimahalle
- Zekibey

== Attractions ==
=== In Ayvalık and Cunda ===
Both Ayvalık and Cunda have a rich heritage of old stone houses built by the lost Greek population and still often called collectively Rum Evleri (Greek Houses). There are also a number of large and imposing Greek Orthodox churches, some of which have been converted into mosques. In the centre of town the Ayios Yannis Kilise became the Saatlı Cami (Clock Mosque) while Ayios Yorgis became the Çınarlı Cami (Plane Tree Mosque). The Taksiyarhis Kilise (Church of the Archangels) is now a museum. The Faneromanı (Ayazma) Kilise is derelict.

On Cunda there is another fine Taksiyarhis Kilise (Church of the Archangels) which was obviously once at the very heart of the local community.

Cunda Island has a number of meyhanes with a very Greek feel to them as well as the Taş Kahve (Stone Teahouse) overlooking the harbour. In the back streets of Ayvalık the Şeytanın Kahvesi (Devil's Teahouse) is similarly Greek in atmosphere. It featured in a Turkish TV series called İki Yaka Bir İsmail (Two Continents, One İsmail).

Both Ayvalık itself and Cunda Island have attractive fishing harbours full of colourful boats. A few restaurants sell the papalina (whitebait) which is a local speciality.

=== Around Ayvalık ===
The ruins of three important ancient cities lie within a short drive of Ayvalık: Assos and Troy are to the north, while Pergamon (modern Bergama) is to the east. Mount Ida (Turkish: Kaz Dağı), which played an important role in ancient Greek mythology and folk tales, is also near Ayvalık (to the north) and can be seen from many points in and around the town centre.

The Gulf of Edremit and the coastal resort towns of Dikili (near ancient Atarneus) and Foça (ancient Phocaea) are also within driving distance for daily excursions.

== Olive cultivation ==
Ayvalık is said to have had millennia of experience in olive cultivation and now has over 2.5 million trees covering 13,200 hectares (33,000 acres) or 41.3% of the region. Hundreds of these trees are over 500 years old. Commercial production began in the 1950s and became prominent in the 1960s. The area is now the second largest producer of olives in Turkey.

The Ayvalık olive (24% and a good pollinator) is among the ten main cultivars in Turkey. 80% of the fruit is processed for oil, 20% for table olives,. The others are Çekiste (26% yield with 1,300,000 trees), Çelebi (400,000 trees and a 20% yield), Domat, Erkence (25% yield and good pollinator with 3,000,000 trees), Gemlik (29% yield and a good pollinator), Izmir Sofralik (20% yield), Memecik, Memeli (20% yield and a good pollinator), and Uslu (900 000 trees).

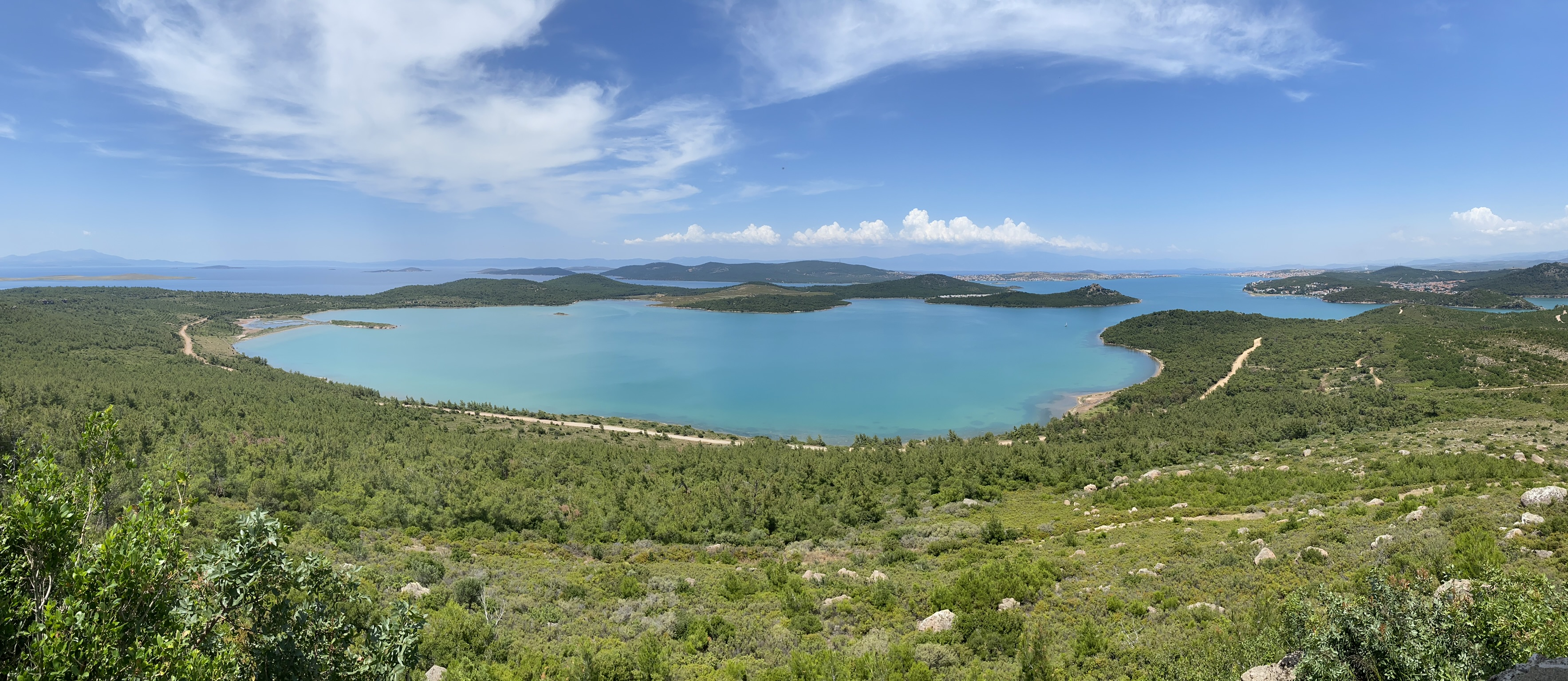
Panoramic view of Ayvalık's bay area and the Ayvalık Islands archipelago, as seen from Şeytan Sofrası hill.

== Notable people ==
- Photis Kontoglou, Greek writer, painter and iconographer
- Elias Venezis, Greek author
- Gregory (Orologas) of Kydonies, Metropolitan of Kydonies, ethnomartyr, who arranged for majority of Greek population to leave for Greece via the International Red Cross, but was himself executed by Turkish authorities
- Meropi Rozan, Greek actor
- Stratos Pagioumtzis, Greek rebetiko singer
- Fotis Mastihiadis, Greek chess player
- Konstantinos Tombras, operator of first printing press in the town and first press in Greece
- Georgios Tombras, Greek soldier of Macedonian Struggle and First Balkan War
- Marco Misciagna, Italian virtuoso violist, was the first and only person to have received honorary citizenship of town of Ayvalık.
- Efstratios Pissas, Greek revolutionary of the Greek War of Independence and later lieutenant general.

== See also ==
- Ayvalık Islands
- Cunda Island
- Marinas in Turkey
- Ayvalık Strait Bridge
