= Zile (disambiguation) =

Zile is a city and a district of Tokat Province.

Zile may also refer to:

- Zile District, district of the Tokat Province of Turkey
- Zile Ram Chochra, Indian politician
- Zīle, Latvian surname

== See also ==
- Van Zile, a surname (including a list of people with the name)
