= Zīle =

Zīle is a Latvian unisex surname. Notable people with the surname include:

- Kristaps Zīle, Latvian ice hockey player
- Mārtiņš Zīle (1863–1945) — internal medicine physician and rector of the University of Latvia
- Roberts Zīle (born 20 June 1958) is a Latvian economist and politician

== See also ==
- Zile (disambiguation)
