= Zile =

- Municipality
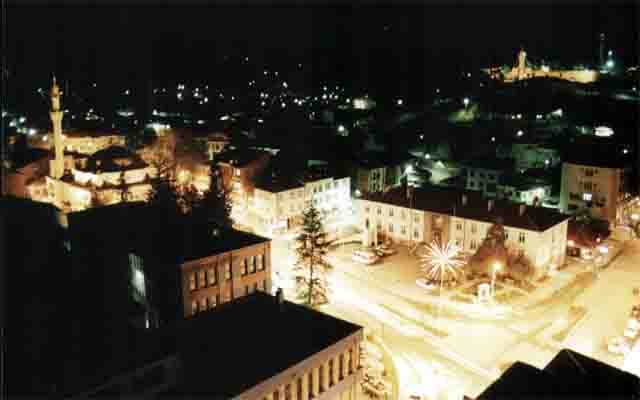
- Zile City Center at night

- Logo

- Location within Turkey
- Coordinates: 40°18′N 35°53′E
- Country: Turkey
- Province: Tokat
- District: Zile

Government
  - Mayor: Şükrü Sargın (CHP)
- Elevation: 710 m (2,330 ft)
- Population (2022): 33,557
- Time zone: UTC+3 (TRT)
- Postal code: 60400
- Area code: 0356
- Website: www.zile.bel.tr

Zile, known in ancient times as Zela (Greek: Ζῆλα) (still as Latin Catholic titular see), is a city in Tokat Province, Turkey. It is the seat of Zile District. Its population is 33,557 (2022). Zile lies to the south of Amasya and the west of Tokat in north-central Turkey. The city has a long history, including as former bishopric and the site of the Battle of Zela, which prompted the phrase "Veni, vidi, vici." Today the city is a center for agricultural marketing and tourism.

== History ==
Historically, Zile has been known as Zela (Greek: Ζῆλα), Zelitis (Greek: Ζηλίτις), Zelid, Anzila, Gırgırıye (Karkariye), Zīleh, Zilleli, Zeyli, and Silas (Greek: Σίλας). Zile castle, the only solid castle in Anatolia, was built by Roman commander Lucius Cornelius Sulla. The castle contains the Amanos temple, and is called silla, meaning "respected". In Semra Meral's Her Yönüyle Zile, she claims that the name "Zile" came from "Zela", stemming from "Silla".

=== Ancient City ===
According to recent archaeological research, there is evidence of human habitation since Neolithic times in Zile. In his book Geographica, Strabo claimed that Zela was founded by Semiramis, a legendary Assyrian queen. By 548 BC, Zela and greater Anatolia were under the rule of Achaemenid Persian Empire. Persian rule saw construction of a portion of the Royal Road in the area, and of temples to the Persian gods Anahita, Vohu-Mano, and Anadates in the city itself. Darius I of Persia divided the largest Anatolian state of that time, Cappadocia, into two, with Zela remaining in Pontus Cappadocia, the northern region.

=== Classical Era ===
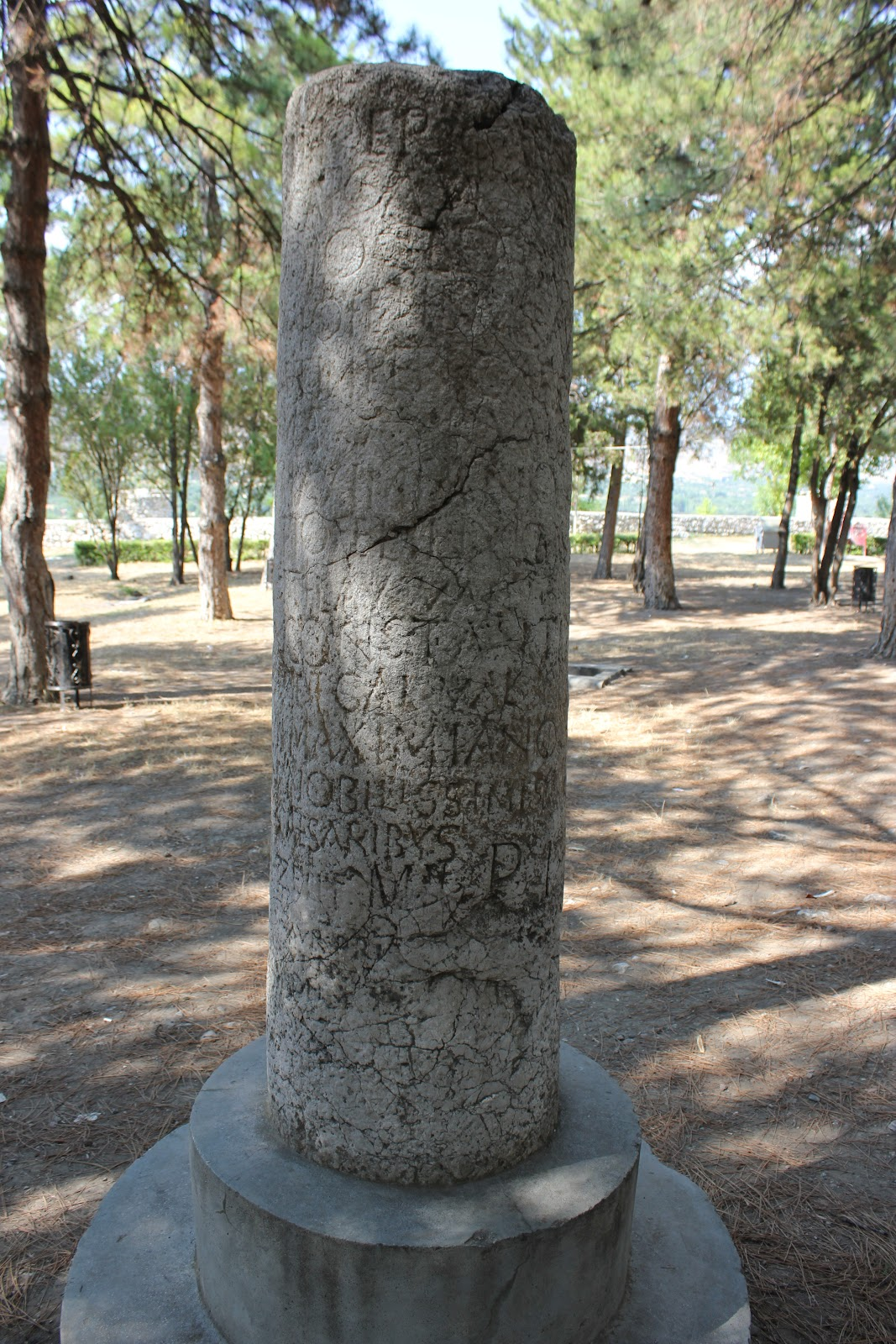
A view from the 2000-year-old historical castle column piece in Zile where Julius Caesar said "Veni, vidi, vici"

After roughly 200 years of Persian rule, Alexander the Great captured Zela from Darius III of Persia as a result of the Battle of the Granicus (334 BC). Following Alexander's death in 323 BC and the collapse of his empire, Zela passed to the Seleucid Empire, a Hellenistic successor state of Alexander the Great's dominion. It controlled the area for 200 years, but by 100 BC, its power in the region started to collapse. As a consequence, King Mithridates VI of Pontus attacked and took Zela in 88 BC, and ordered the killing of all Romans living there. This led the nearby Cappadocians to call on Rome for help. The Roman army, under Sulla's command, fought and defeated Mithradates in the First Mithridatic War. Mithridates attacked Zela again in 67 BC with the help of his Armenian ally Tigranes the Great, king of Greater Armenia, initiating the Third Mithridatic War, which ended with victory by the Romans under Pompeius Magnus and the suicide of Mithridates in 63 BC. In Pompey's settlement of Pontus, Zela received a civic constitution and a sizable territory thus transforming from its previous status as a temple domain to a city.

In 49 BC, civil war broke out between Julius Caesar and Pompey. While the Romans were distracted by this, Pharnaces II of Pontus, son of Mithridates, decided to seize the opportunity and take revenge for his father. His attack on Zela was halted by Julius Caesar in the bloody Battle of Zela (47 BC). While Caesar's army suffered great losses, Pharnaces's was completely destroyed in five hours. After this victory, Caesar sent his famous message to the Roman Senate: "Veni Vidi Vici", meaning "I came, I saw, I conquered". Caesar's words were written on a cylindrical marble column and placed in the city castle.

According to Strabo, Zela had the temple of Anaïtis (Greek: ἱερὸν τῆς Ἀναΐτιδος), who was also revered by the Armenians.

=== Middle Ages ===
In 241, the Sassanid king Shapur I, attacked the Romans and defeated Roman Emperor Valerian, thus capturing Zela. From 241 to 1071, Zile was conquered many times by the Byzantines and Sasanids. Under Byzantine rule, Zile became a (now Titular Latin) bishopric of Asia Minor, suffragan of Amasya in the former Roman province of Helenopontus (see below).

Zela was conquered by Danishmend Melik Ahmet Gazi in 1071 and, since, has belonged to the Turks, who suppressed the bishopric. In 1174, Anatolian Seljuks captured the city from Danishmends under Izzettin II Kılıçaslan. After the collapse of the Anatolian Seljuks, the Eretna Emirate was founded in Zile's district in 1335. The Ottomans defeated Ertans in 1397 under the rule of Sultan Bayezid I, integrating Zile into their empire.

=== Modern History ===
During the course of the Greco-Turkish War of 1919–1922 (also known as Turkish War of Independence), some supporters of Sharia (strict Islamic law) seized power in Zile and attacked the barracks of new Turkish Republic's army. The soldiers were forced to retreat to the city castle and consequently asked for help from the Çorum battalion. The battalion reached the city in four days and upon their arrival they started bombing the city so as to force the rebels to surrender. As a result of heavy bombardment, Zile suffered a great fire which led to the loss of two thirds of its infrastructure and most of its forest cover. Finally, the army managed to put down the rebellion and regained control. Since then, Zile has been a rural district in Tokat province of the Republic of Turkey.

== Ecclesiastical history ==
Zela, in the Roman province of Helenopontus (civil diocese of Pontus), was a suffragan of the Metropolitan Archdiocese of Amasea, in the sway of the Patriarchate of Constantinople. The following Suffragan Bishops of Zela are historically documented :

- Heraclius took part in the Council of Ancyra in 314 and in the ecumenical First Council of Nicaea in 325
  - ’’ Bitinicusus, an Arian (heretic), participated in the synod of Gangra in 340 and intervened at the Arian 'conciliabolum' at Philippopolis in 343/344
- Atticus attended the Council of Chalcedon in 451
- Hyperechius signed in 458 the letter of the episcopate of Helenopontus to Byzantine emperor Leo I the Thracian after Coptic mobs lynched Patriarch Proterius of Alexandria
- Georgius was at the ‘Robber’ Council in Trullo in 692
- Constantinus took part in the Second Council of Nicaea in 787
- Paulus attended the Council of Constantinople in 869-870 and the Council of Constantinople of 879-880 which rehabilitated Patriarch Photius of Constantinople.
- The Greek Orthodox bishop of the city from June 1912 to May 1921 was Saint Hieromartyr Euthymios Agritellis Bishop of Zela, who was imprisoned and executed by Turkish authorities for urging the local Pontic Greeks to take up arms against Turkish militias (cheta) who were terrorizing the Greek population at the time.

=== Titular see ===
The diocese was nominally restored no later than the 18th century as Latin Titular bishopric of Zela (Latin = Curiate Italian) / Zeliten(us)

It has been vacant for decades, having had the following incumbents:

- Francisco San Andrés, Hieronymites (O.S.H.) (1758.10.02 – death 1766.01.20) as Auxiliary Bishop of Salamanca (Spain) (1758.10.02 – 1766.01.20)
- Giovanni Devoti (1804.03.26 – 1804.05.29); previously Bishop of Anagni (Italy) (1789.03.30 – 1804.03.26); later ‘promoted’ on emeritate as Titular Archbishop of Carthage (1804.05.29 – died 1820.09.18)
- Anton Kavčič, Jesuit Order (S.J.) (1805.09.23 – 1807.07.15) as Auxiliary Bishop of Wien (Vienna, Austria) (1805.09.23 – 1807.07.15); later Bishop of Ljubljana (Slovenia, now Metropolitan) (1807.07.15 – died 1814.03.17)
- Jean-Louis Florens (羅), M.E.P. (1807.09.08 – death 1814.12.14) as Coadjutor Apostolic Vicar of Szechwan 四川 (China) (1807.09.08 – 1814.12.14)
- Giuseppe Pezzella, Augustinians (O.E.S.A.) (1828.06.23 – 1830?) as Coadjutor Bishop of Calvi (Italy) (1828.06.23 – 1830?) and Coadjutor Bishop of Teano (Italy) (1828.06.23 – 1830?); next succeeded both as Bishop of Calvi (1830? – 1833.01.03) and as Bishop of Teano (1830? – died 1833.01.03)
- Peter Paul Lefevère (1841.07.23 – death 1869.03.04) (Belgian) as Coadjutor Bishop of Detroit (USA) (1841.07.23 – 1869.03.04)
- Manuel María León González y Sánchez (1876.01.28 – 1877.06.22)
- Pierre-Noël-Joseph Foucard (富于道), M.E.P. (1878.08.13 – 1889.03.31)
- Father Laurent Blettery, M.E.P. (1890.09.02 – 1891.08.17)
- Hermann Joseph Schmitz (1893.08.25 – 1899.08.21)
- Marie-Félix Choulet (蘇裴理斯), M.E.P. (1901.02.21 – 1923.07.31)
- Basil Tatach (1924.05.20 – 1948.05.13)
- Alejandro Olalia (later Archbishop) (1949.05.14 – 1950.05.06)
- José María García Lahiguera (later Archbishop) (1950.05.17 – 1964.07.07)

== Demographics ==
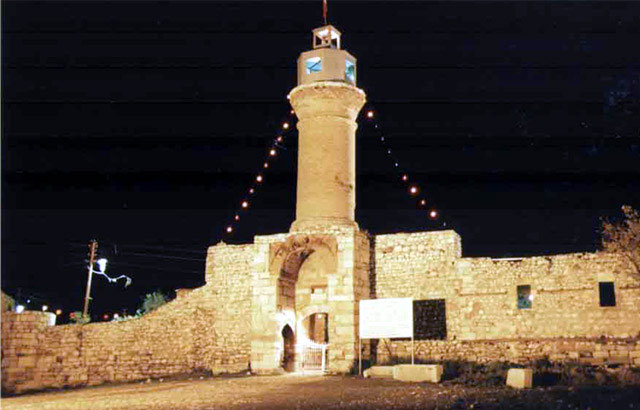
Entrance of Zile Castle

Historical population
Year	Pop.	±% p.a.
1985	37,097	—
1990	46,090	+4.44%
1997	41,390	−1.52%
2007	36,154	−1.34%
2012	34,442	−0.97%
2017	33,668	−0.45%
2022	33,557	−0.07%
Source: 1985 census, 1990 census, 1997 census and TÜIK (2007-2022)

== Attractions ==
There are several columns in the center of the castle, but some researchers claim that the actual column with Caesar's famous words was stolen, and the thieves have not been found yet. There are many other historical buildings and artifacts from Hittites, Lycians, Persians, Greeks, Romans and Turks in Zile. Among these, Zile castle, the Roman theatre, Ulu Camii and Çifte Hamam are the most famous. Kaya Mezarı, Kusyuva, Çay Pınarı, Imam Melikiddin Tomb, Seyh Musa Fakih Tomb, Elbaşı Mosque, Mast Tumulus, Namlı Hisar Kale, Anzavur Caves, Hacı Boz Bridge, Koç Taşı and Manastry in Kuruçay are also popular.

The remains of the Roman theatre are visible to the east of the citadel hill, together with some rock tombs. Two Ottoman baths, the Yeni Hamam and the Çifte Hamam, date from the 16th and 17th century and the Hasan Aga Madrasah was built in 1497. The Boyaci Hasan Aga Mosque with its stalactiform prayer niche dates from 1479 and the Seyh Musa Fakih Tomb is also very old with 1106 or 1305 given as possible construction dates.

Mast Tumulus, an ancient site located in Zile, is of special importance since it hosts the palace of a Hittite ruler, earthenware utensils and Hittite hieroglyphics.

== Geography ==
Zile covers an area of 1,512 square kilometres (584 sq mi) within its city limits and has an elevation of 710 metres (2,330 ft). Turhal, Çekerek, Artova, Kadışehri, and Amasya are all towns located near Zile. The city is mostly surrounded by a fertile plain called Zile Ovası crossed by the Yeşil River and can produce harvests twice a year. South of the city, however, are the Deveci Mountains (1,892 m / 6,207 ft high), Güvercin Çalı, and Hüseyin Gazi Hill. Zile once had a great forest covering most of the plain, but during the 1950s, the city lost much of its forest because of the excessive breeding of goats and the use of wood for heating purposes. However, there is a recent study to plan reforestation in the area.

The city's water supply is provided by the Çekerek River, flowing from Zile to Çekerek and the Büyükaköz dam which was constructed on the Çatak river. The Süreyyabey Dam and hydroelectric plant is under construction and will provide electricity and water for irrigation in the area.

=== Climate ===
Zile's weather is influenced by the narrow coast land of the Black Sea Region to the north, bringing humidity, and by the Central Anatolia inland plateau to the south, with its low rainfall and cold winters. Summers are hot and dry, while the winters are snowy and cold. The weather is hot throughout the months of June to September, as the average summer maximum is 28 °C (83 °F), and the average minimum is 13 °C (56 °F), and is cold throughout the months of December to February as the average winter maximum is 7 °C (45 °F), and the average minimum is as low as -3 °C (27 °F). Northerly winds are responsible for humid climate from April to June. It is usually rainy during the months of April, May, June, November and December.

Climate data for Zile (1991–2020)
Month	Jan	Feb	Mar	Apr	May	Jun	Jul	Aug	Sep	Oct	Nov	Dec	Year
Mean daily maximum °C (°F)	6.0 (42.8)	8.3 (46.9)	13.2 (55.8)	18.7 (65.7)	23.3 (73.9)	26.9 (80.4)	30.1 (86.2)	30.8 (87.4)	27.2 (81.0)	21.4 (70.5)	13.4 (56.1)	7.6 (45.7)	19.0 (66.2)
Daily mean °C (°F)	1.3 (34.3)	2.7 (36.9)	7.0 (44.6)	11.8 (53.2)	16.1 (61.0)	19.7 (67.5)	22.5 (72.5)	22.8 (73.0)	19.0 (66.2)	13.9 (57.0)	6.9 (44.4)	2.8 (37.0)	12.3 (54.1)
Mean daily minimum °C (°F)	−2.4 (27.7)	−1.7 (28.9)	1.9 (35.4)	5.8 (42.4)	9.8 (49.6)	13.1 (55.6)	15.3 (59.5)	15.6 (60.1)	12.0 (53.6)	7.9 (46.2)	2.0 (35.6)	−0.8 (30.6)	6.6 (43.9)
Average precipitation mm (inches)	43.42 (1.71)	34.19 (1.35)	49.46 (1.95)	49.27 (1.94)	61.55 (2.42)	44.52 (1.75)	8.78 (0.35)	6.64 (0.26)	17.0 (0.67)	33.09 (1.30)	40.46 (1.59)	44.5 (1.75)	432.88 (17.04)
Average precipitation days (≥ 1.0 mm)	7.3	6.4	8.3	8.4	9.0	6.2	2.6	2.2	3.1	5.1	5.8	7.3	71.7
Average relative humidity (%)	77.4	72.1	66.0	63.3	65.0	64.1	59.9	60.0	61.5	67.9	74.3	79.1	67.5
Source: NOAA

== Economy ==
Historically, coal was mined in Zile.

Agriculture, trade, and livestock are the main economic activities of Zile. Zile is a center of cereal production such that she is one of the biggest exporters of wheat, barley, lentil and common vetch in the Black Sea region. Zile is famous for its grapes, leblebi, cherry, and fruit gardens. The annual Cherry Festival is very famous in Tokat, Sivas and Yozgat. People of Zile don't use their grapes to produce wine, but pekmez - a syrup-like liquid mixed from different kinds of fruit-juices.

The students of Zile Dinçerler School of Tourism and Hotel Management of Gaziosmanpasha University play an important role in city's economic activities. The industry of Zile is developing rapidly. Since 1996, there has been a major movement from agriculture to industry. Anatolian Tigers constructed 55 factories whose major products include textiles, sugar beet, furniture, tomato sauce, leblebi, marble and shoes.

The municipality and the European Union have had a joint project to increase the tourism potential of Zile and to transform the city into a tourism destination. The project is funded by the EU and includes advertisements as well as education of local people about tourism.

== Education ==
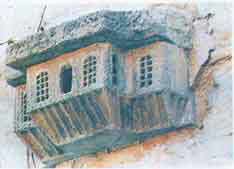
Kuşyuva

The city boasts 100% literacy in the city centre and over 90% in surrounding villages, with public and Imam Hatip schools, and a roughly 1:27 student-teacher ratio. There are 126 primary and secondary schools with 14,373 students and 540 teachers. Zile Dinçerler Lisesi, Dinçerler 75th Year Anatolian High School and Anadolu Öğretmen Lisesi provide high school education in Zile. There are also four professional high schools providing technical education. Gaziosmanpasa University's Zile Dinçerler School of Tourism and Hotel Management is also located in Zile. By the end of 2008, with the donations of Serafettin and Cemalettin Dincer, schooling will gain totally new educational premises including a modern and luxurious hotel building which will be also used for practical education by students.

== Media and social life ==
In Zile, theatres and concerts are conducted at a movie theatre whose capacity is 850 people. Along with national TV channels and radios, there is one local TV channel and two radio stations that keep Zile people up to date on current events. Zile has three local daily newspapers (Özhaber, Zile Postası, Gündem) and daily newspapers sell around 4000 copies per day.

== Gallery ==
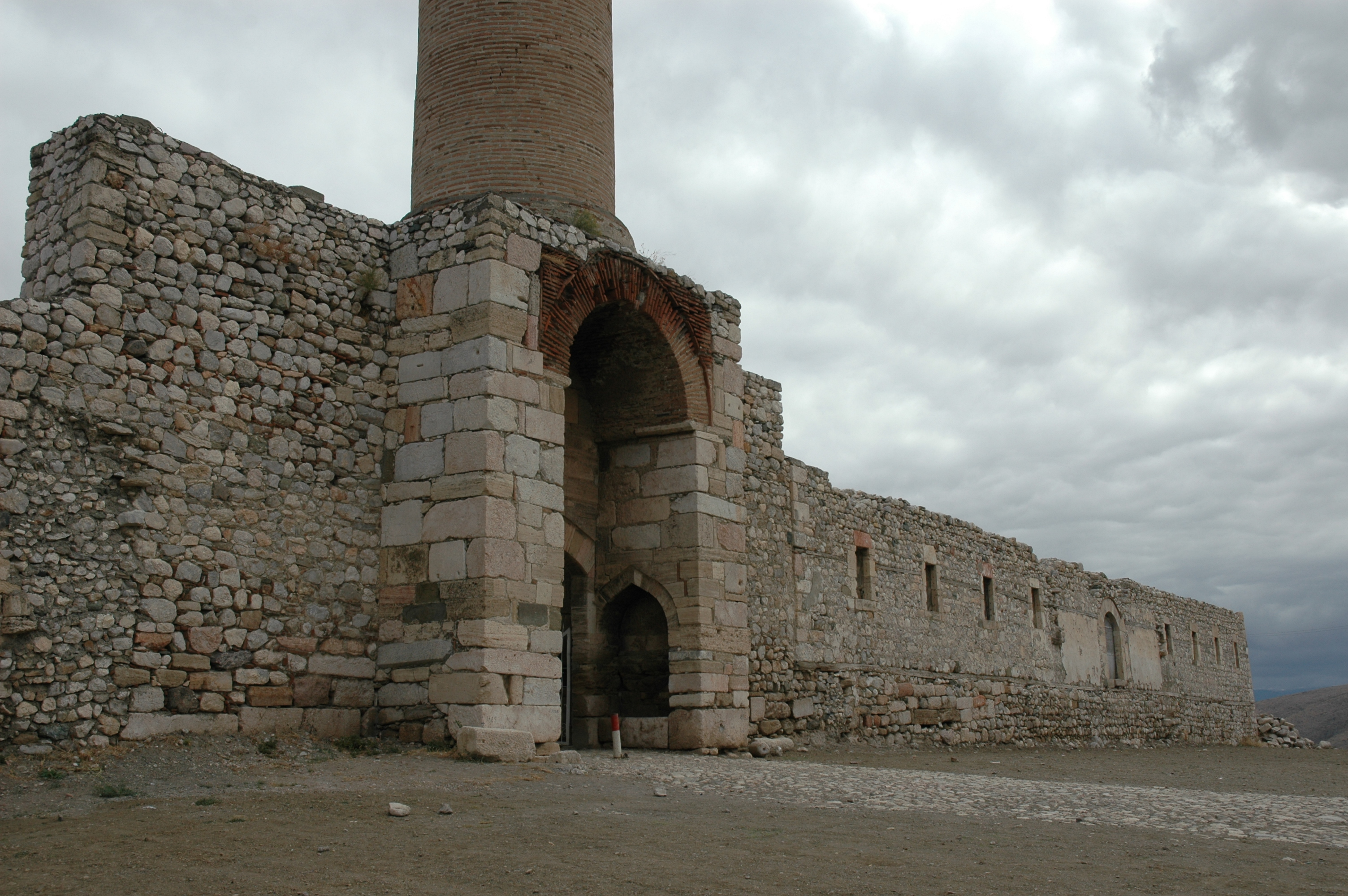
Zile 2004 1866

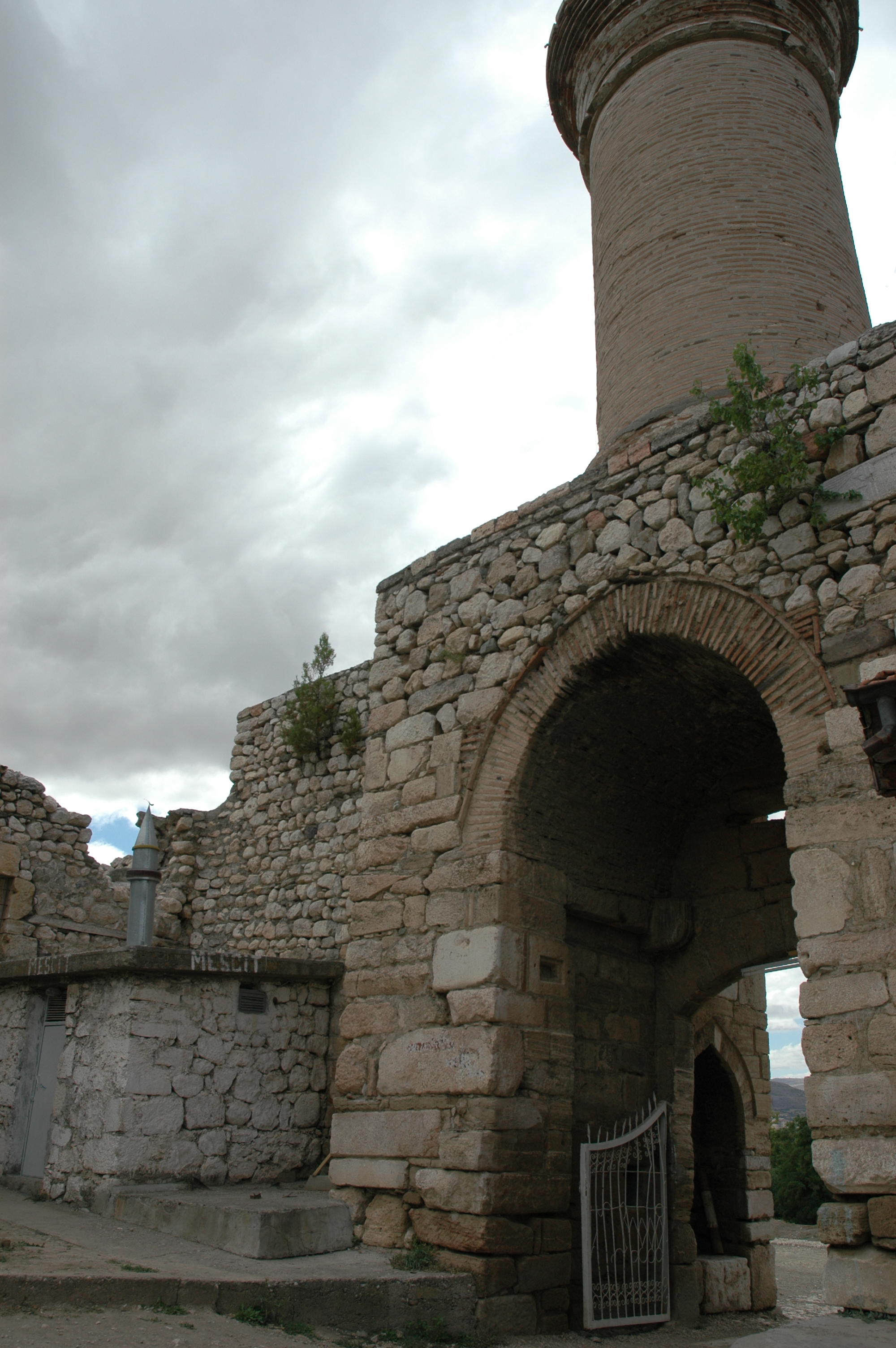
Zile 2004 1863

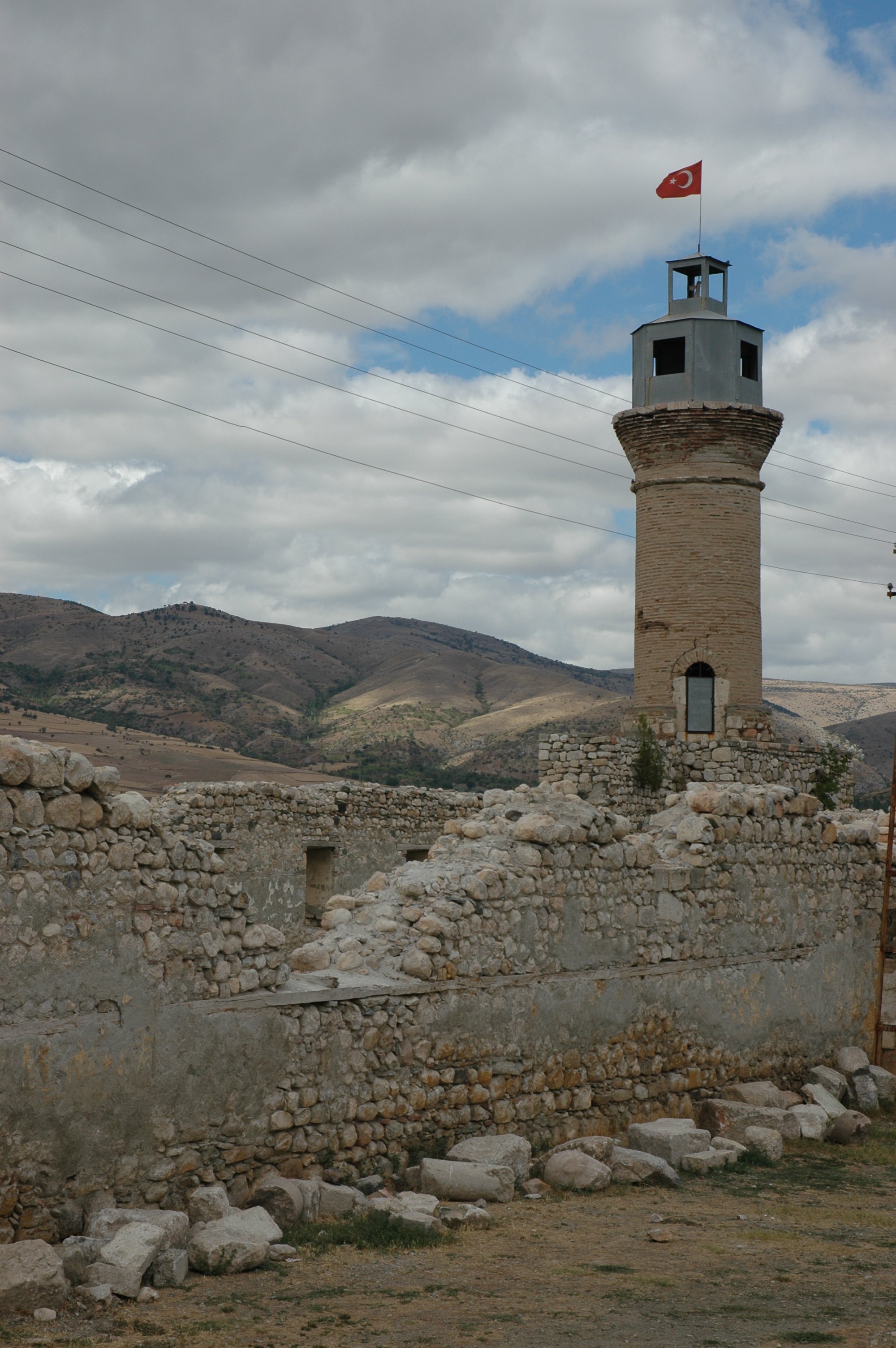
Zile 2004 1854

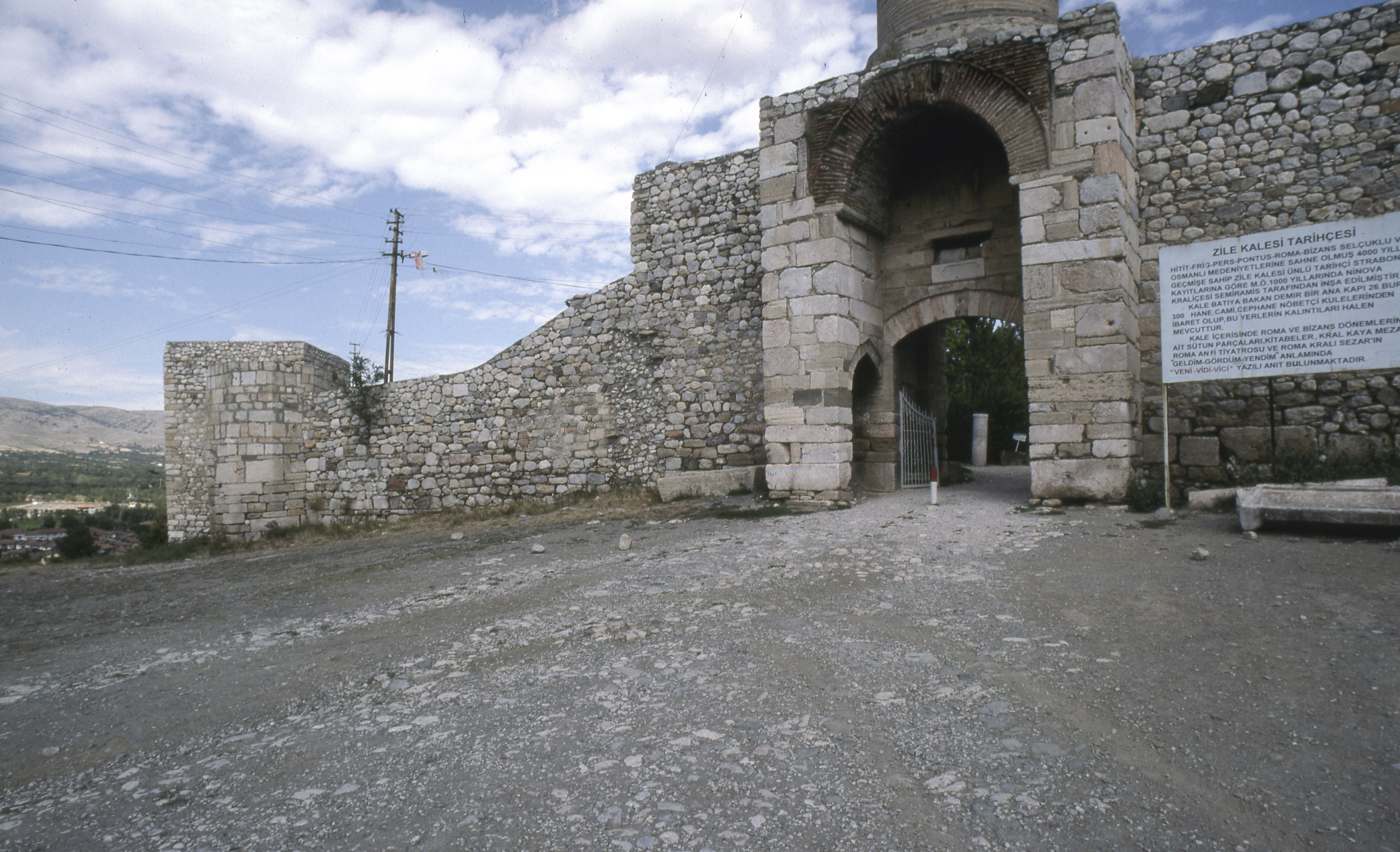
Zile 153

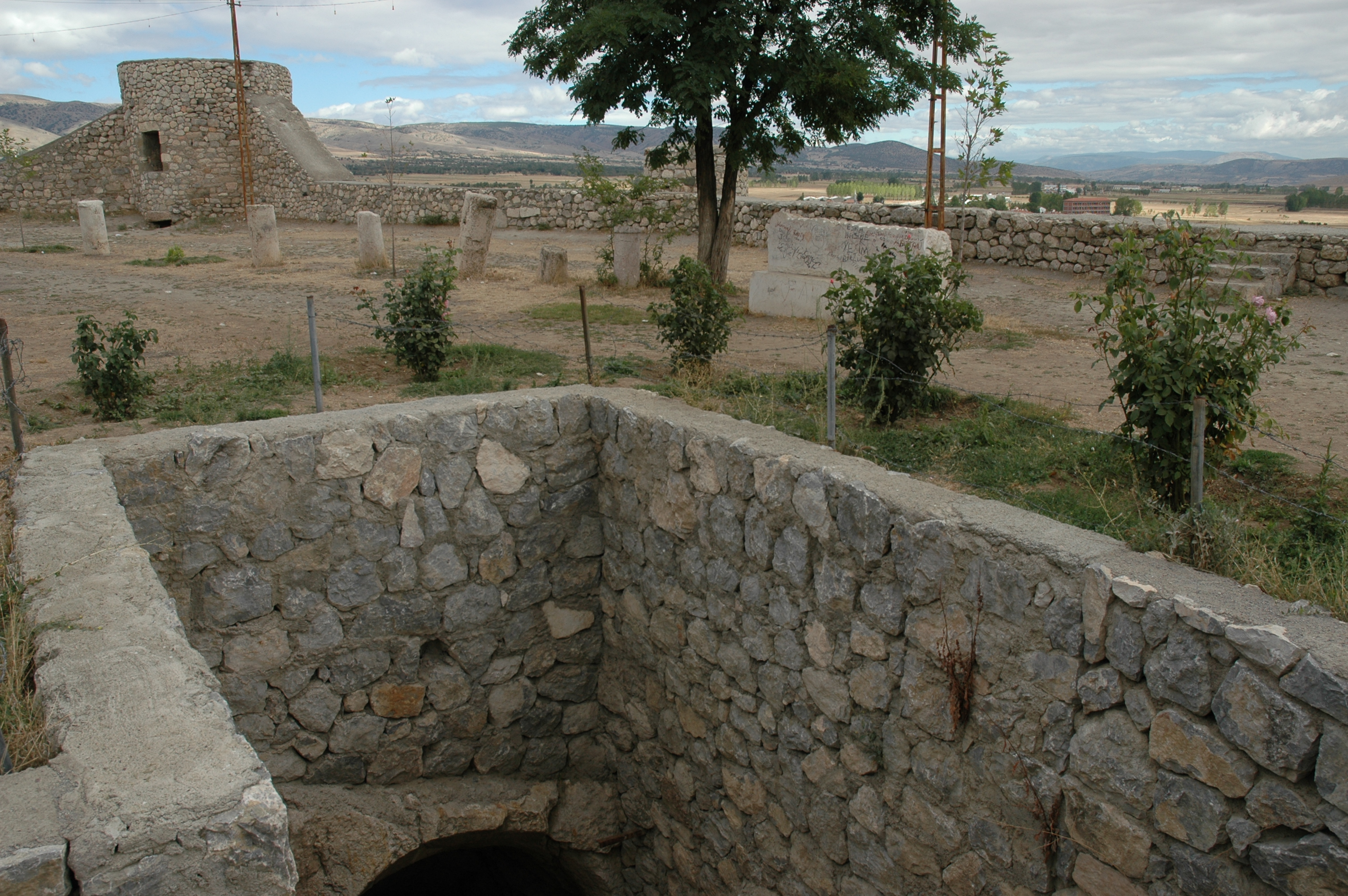
Zile 2004 1858

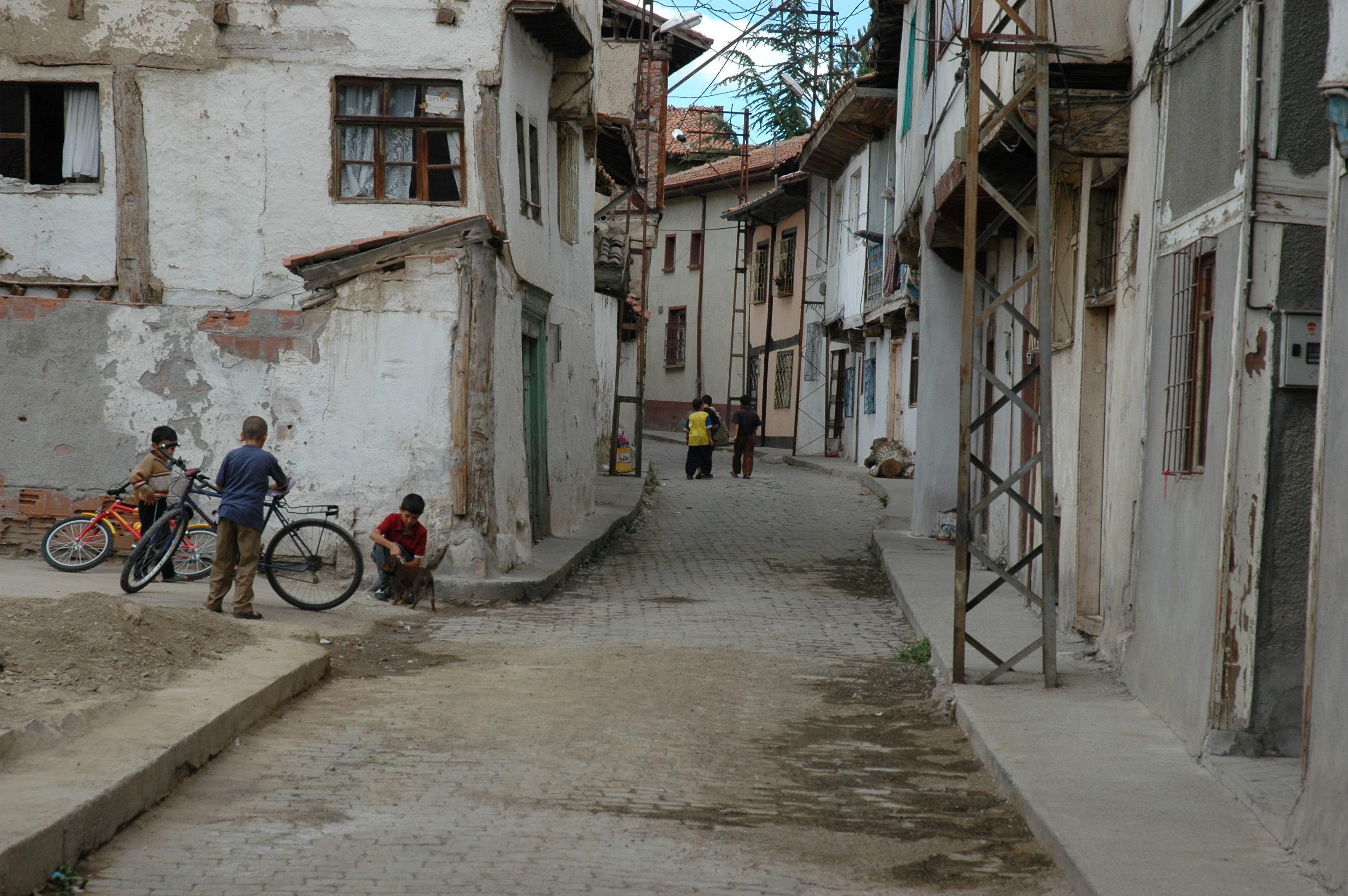
Zile 2004 1869

Zile 2004 1878

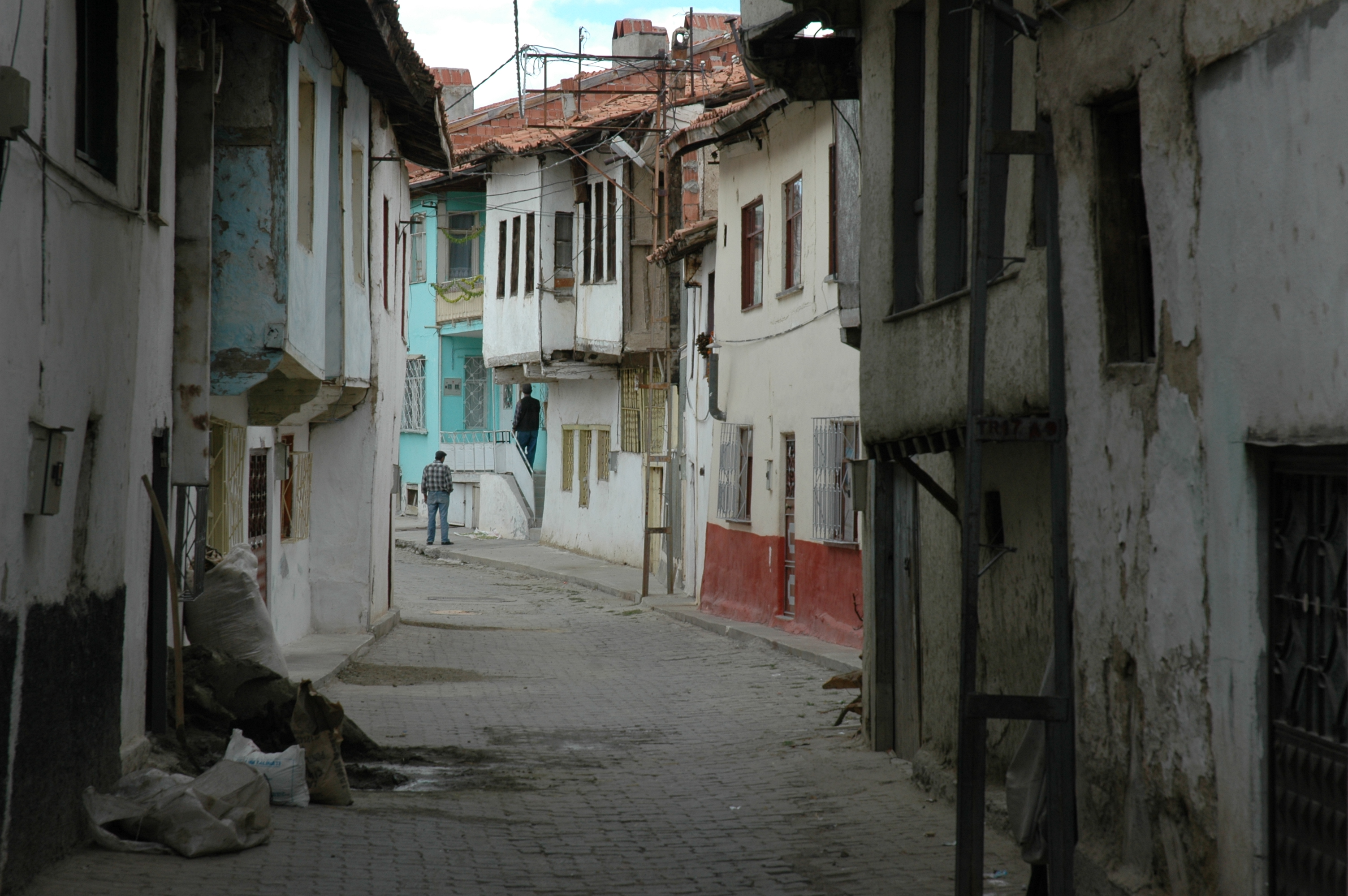
Zile 2004 1868

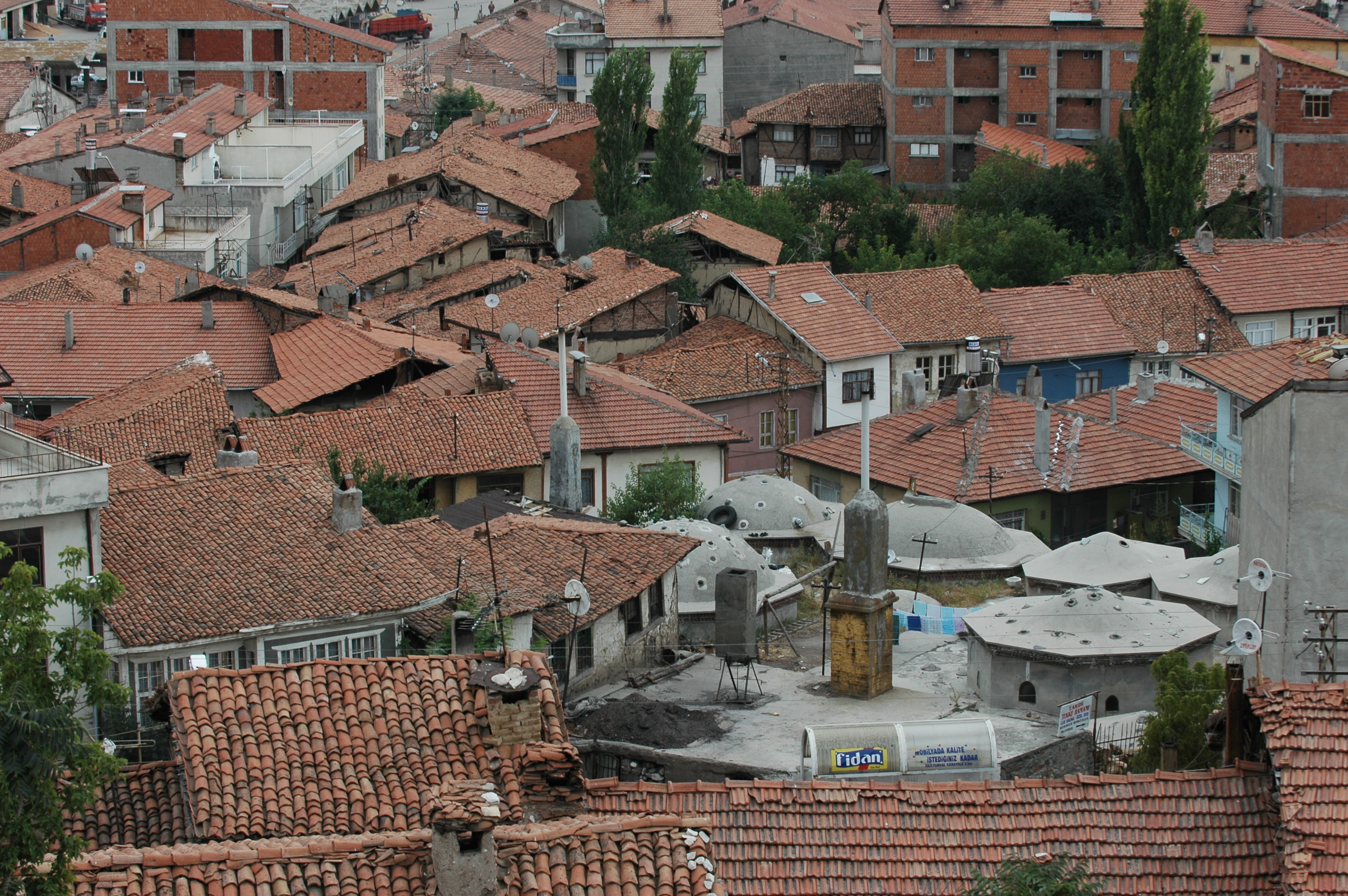
Zile 2004 1847

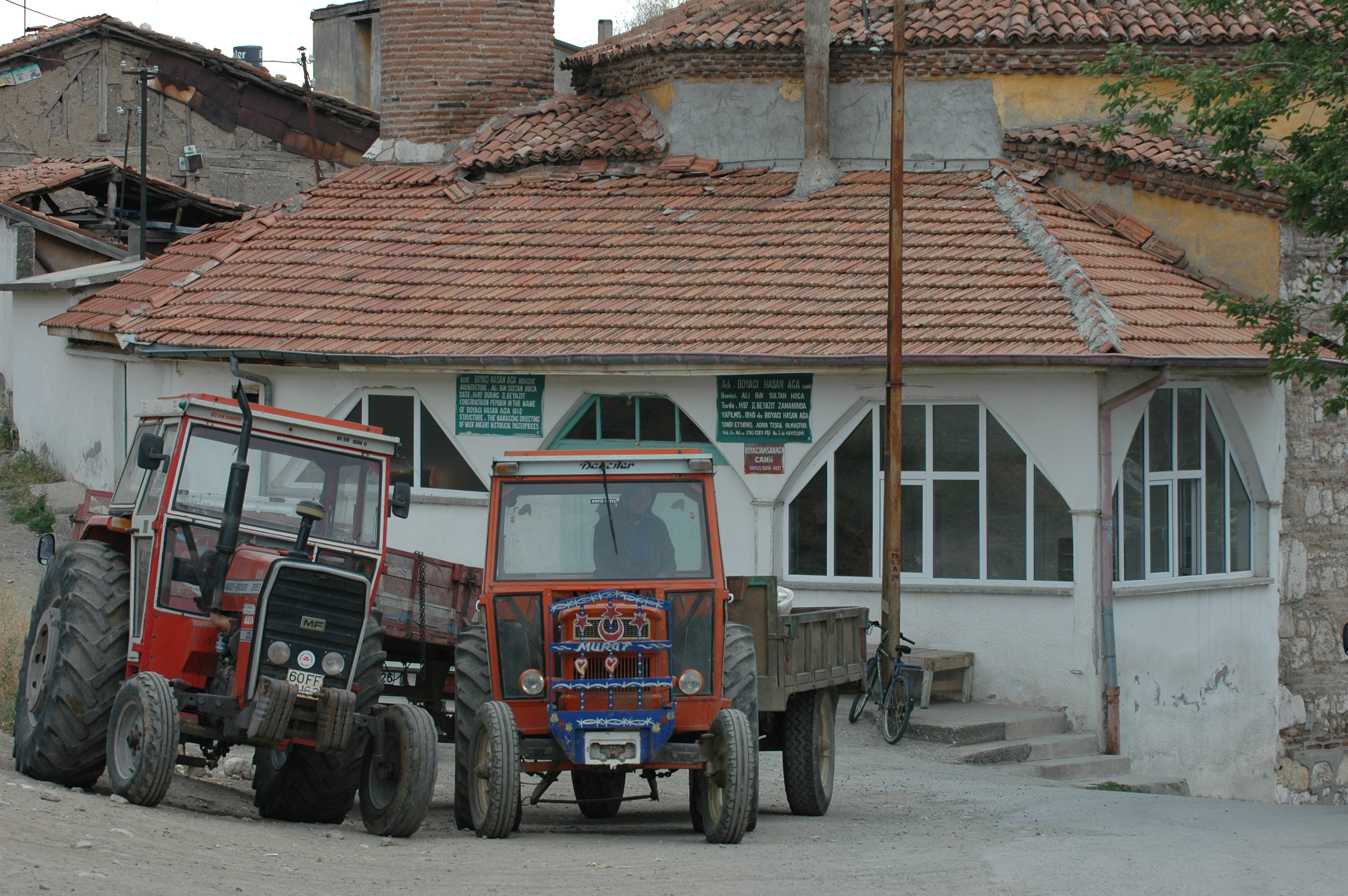
Zile 2004 1845

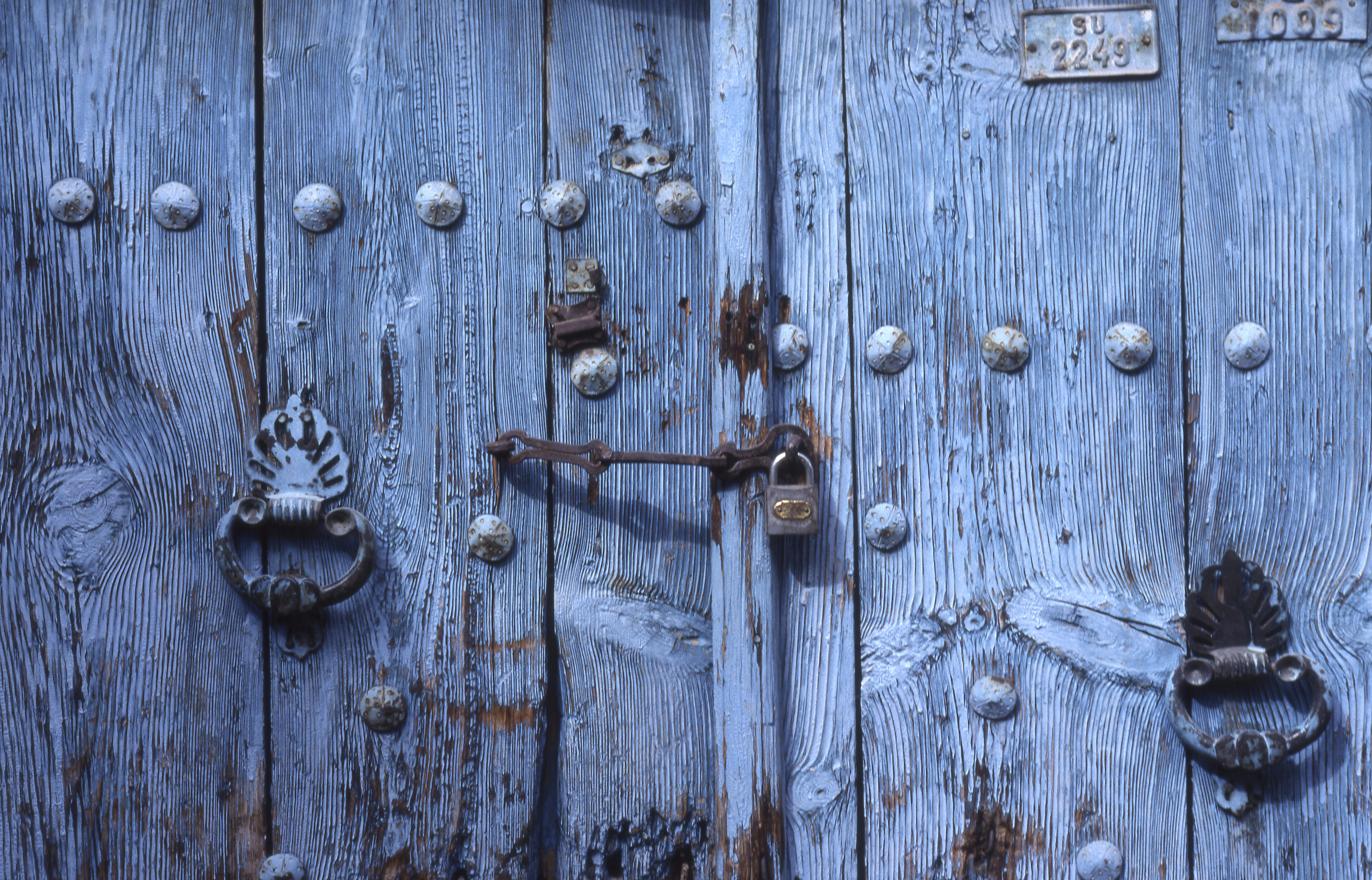
Zile 158

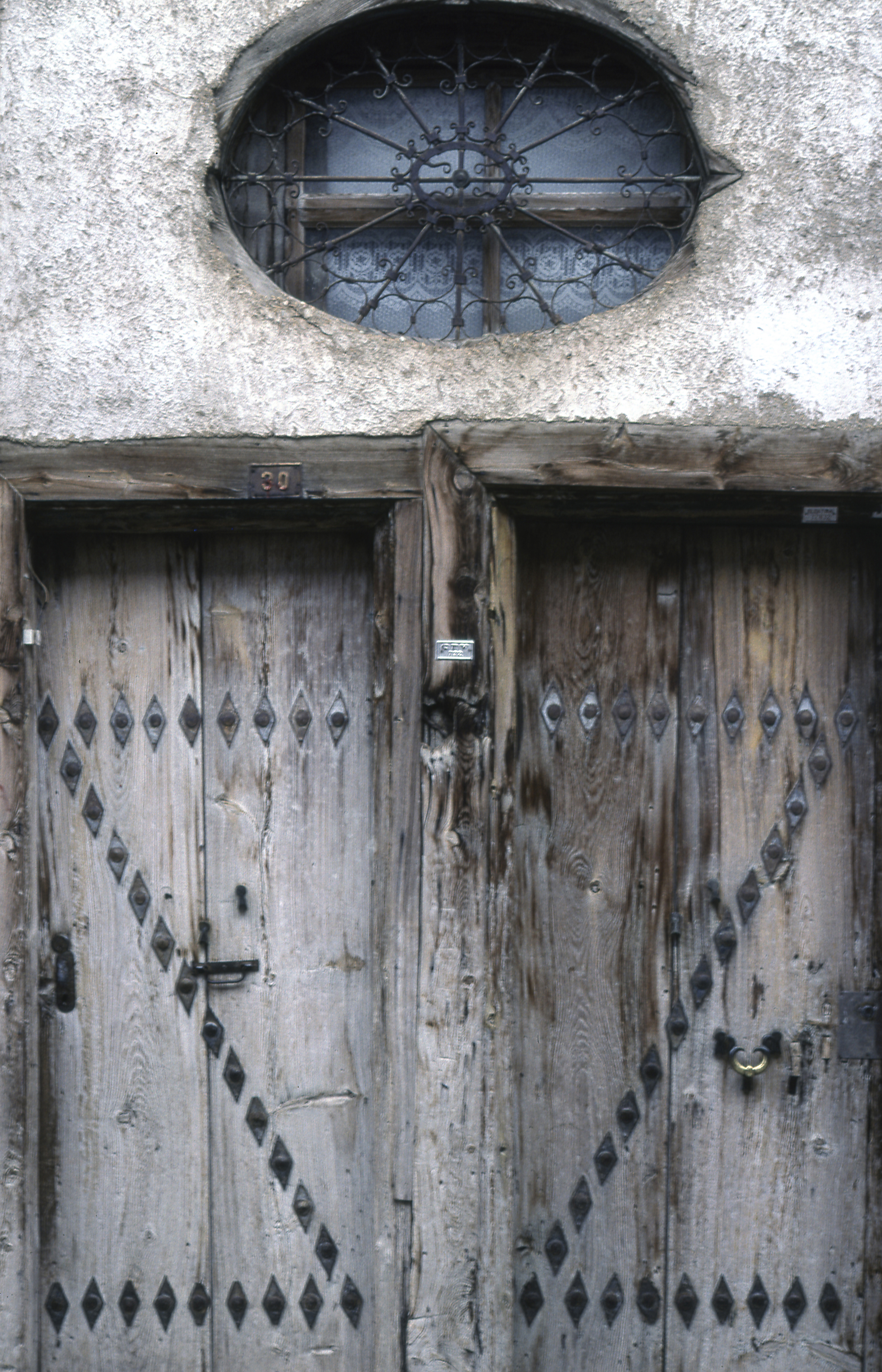
Zile 027

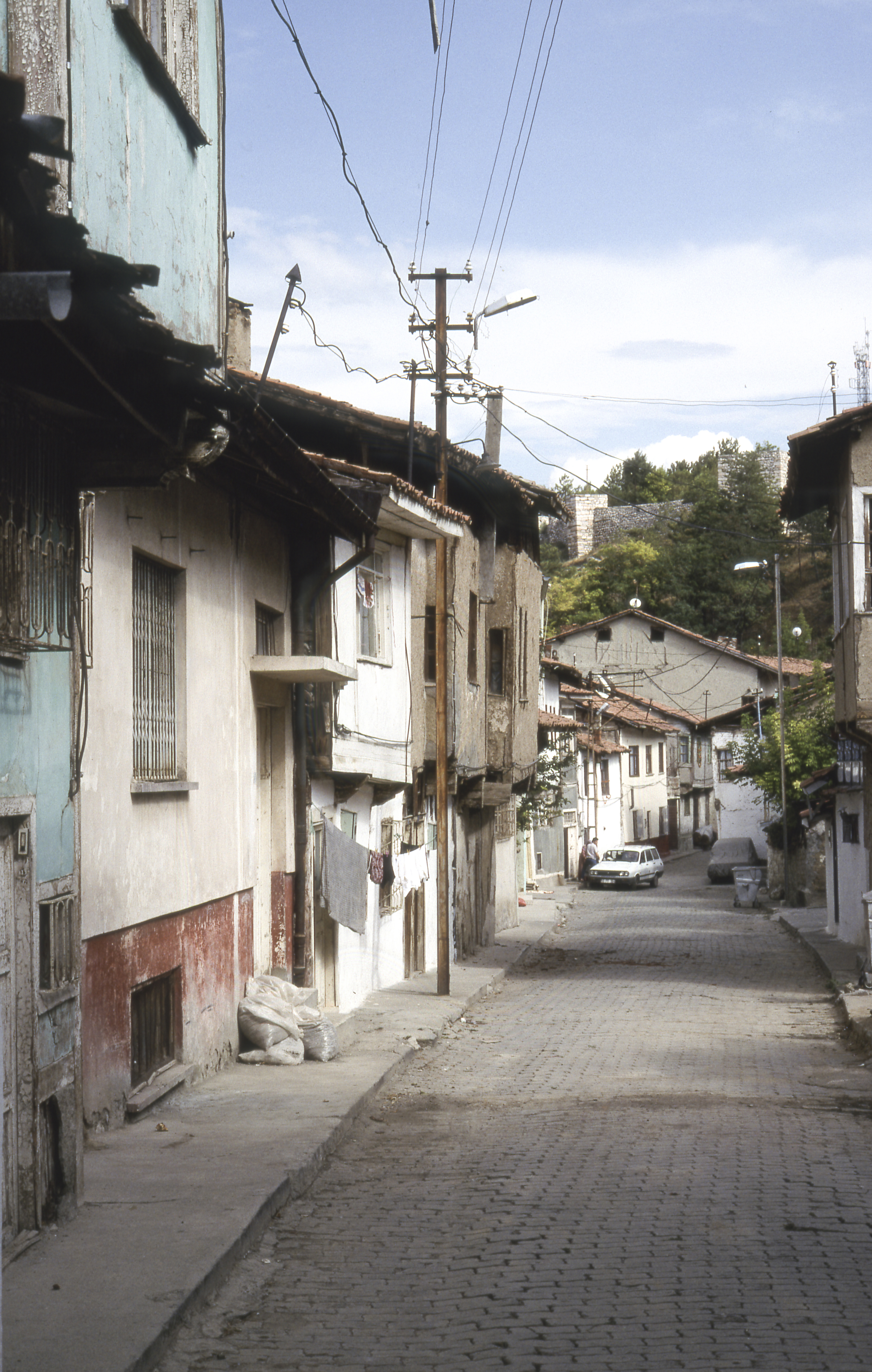
Zile 157

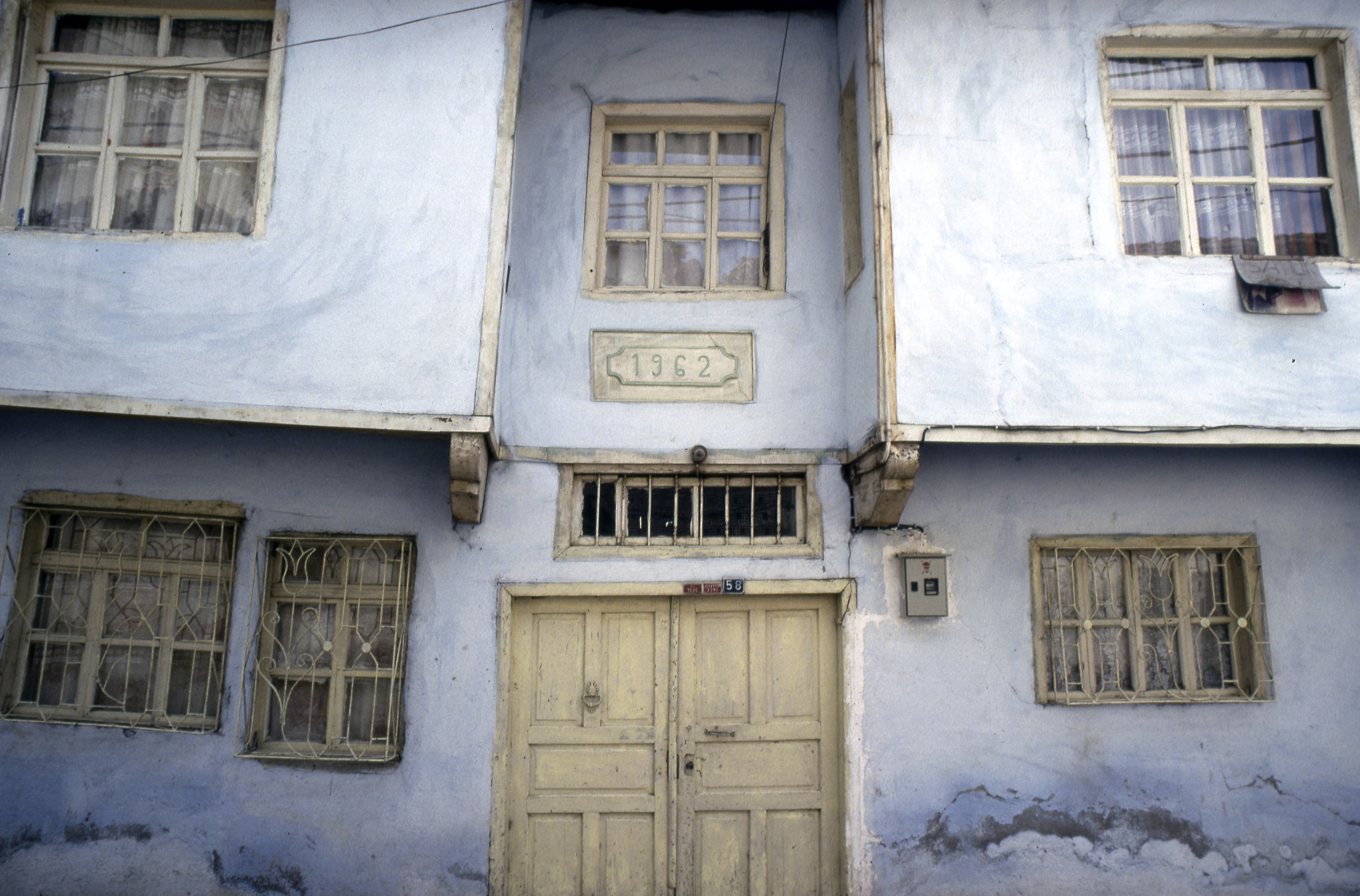
Zile 155

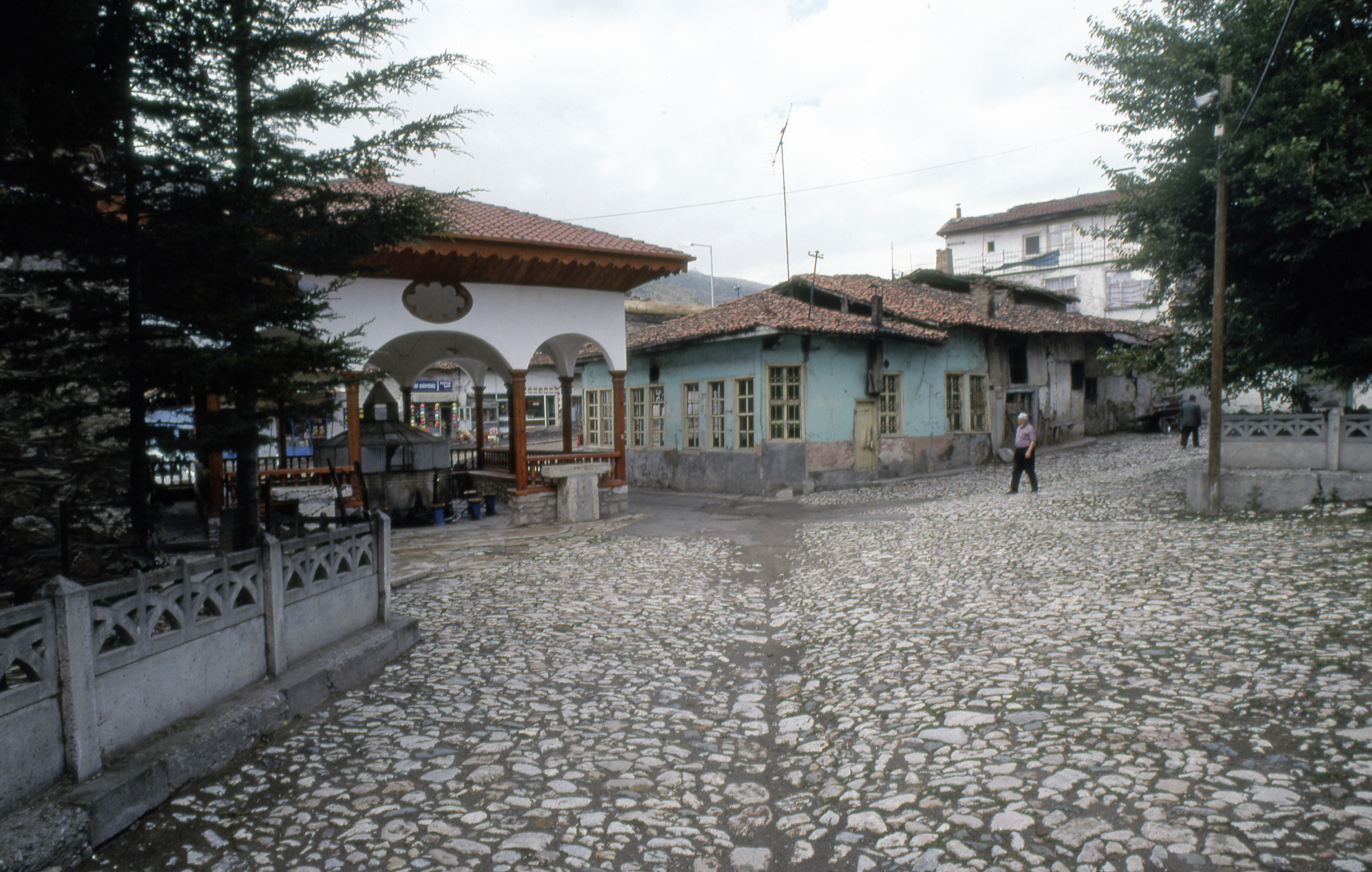
Zile 030

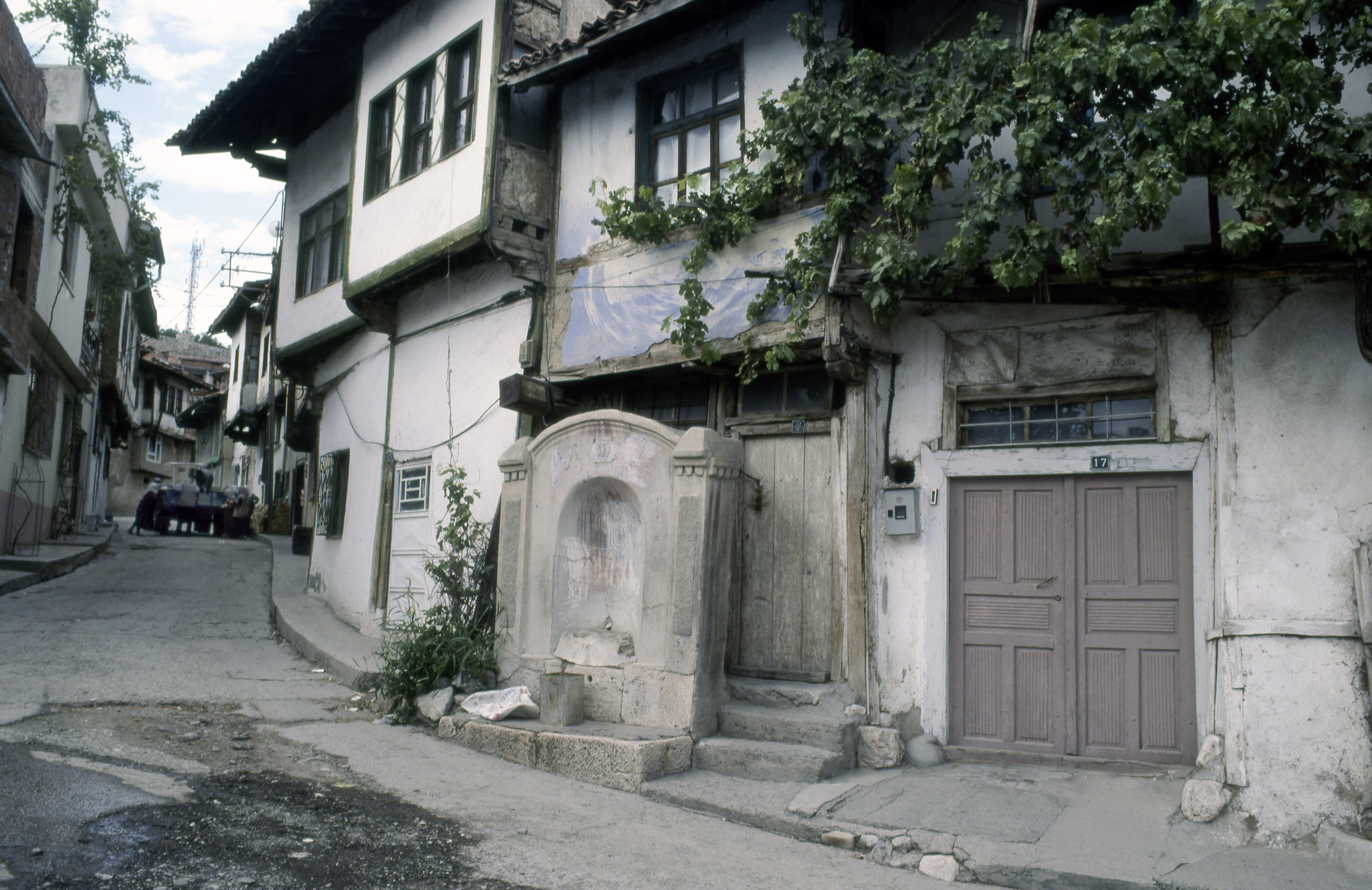
Zile 023

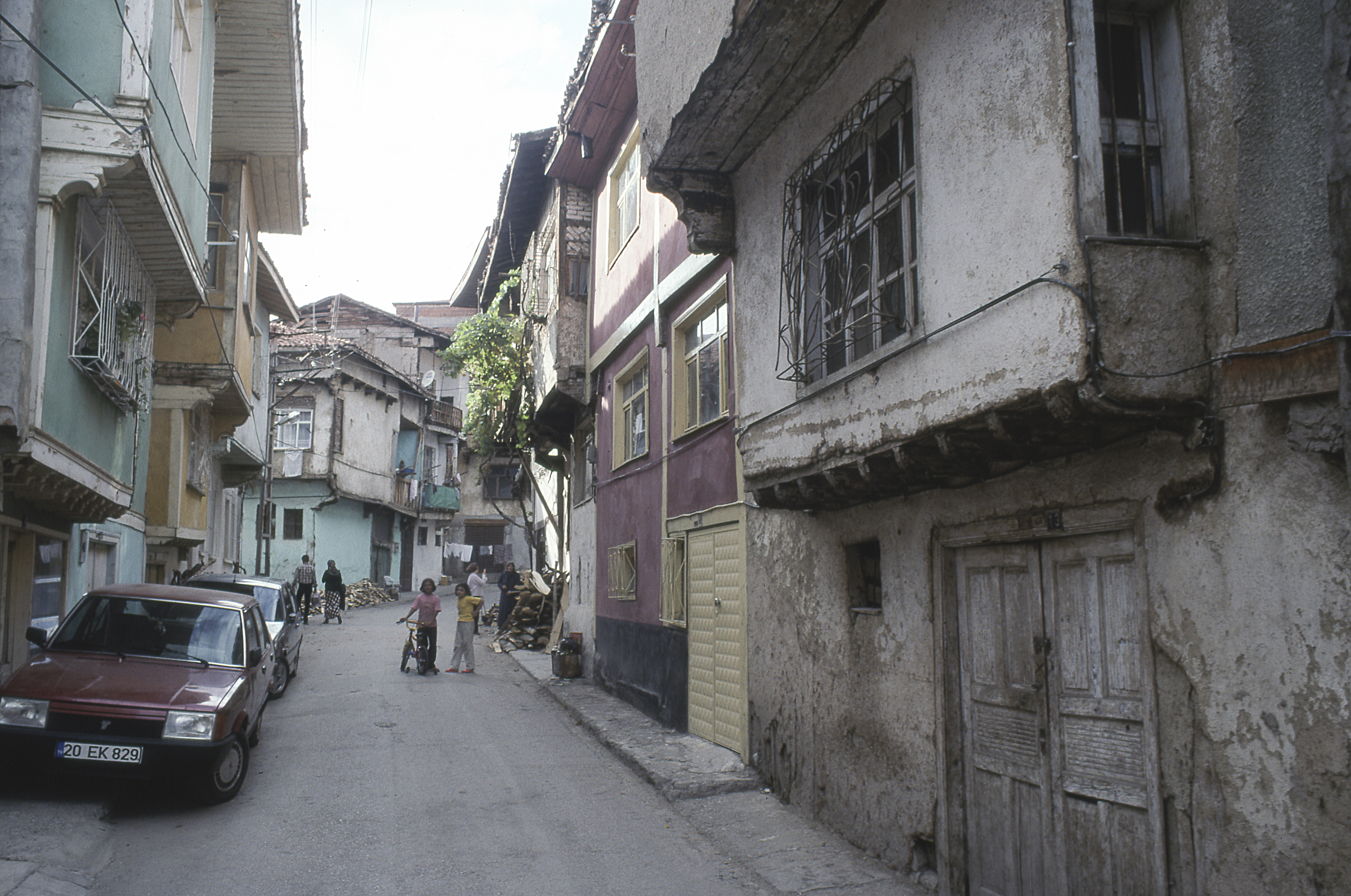
Zile 025

== Transportation ==
Zile is linked by highways with the cities of Tokat and Amasya and is near the Sivas-Samsun railway.

== Sources and external links ==
- Official website (in Turkish)
- GCatholic - (former &) titular bishopric

Bibliography- ecclesiastical history

- Pius Bonifacius Gams, Series episcoporum Ecclesiae Catholicae, Leipzig 1931, p. 442
- Michel Lequien, Oriens christianus in quatuor Patriarchatus digestus, Paris 1740, vol. I, coll. 541-542
- Konrad Eubel, Hierarchia Catholica Medii Aevi, vol. 6, p. 450

Further reading

- Braund, D., T. Sinclair, D. Braund, R. Talbert, T. Elliott, S. Gillies (22 August 2021). "Places: 857382 (Zela)". Pleiades.
