= Van Zile =

Van Zile is a surname. Notable people with the name include:

- Caroline Van Zile, American lawyer and politician
- Edward Sims Van Zile (1863–1931), American writer
- Jessie Van Zile Belden (1857–1910) American novelist
- Philip T. Van Zile (1843–1919), American politician and judge from Michigan

== See also ==
- Van Zile House, 1736 house in Midland Park, Bergen County, New Jersey, United States
