= Zile District =

District of Tokat Province, Turkey

- District
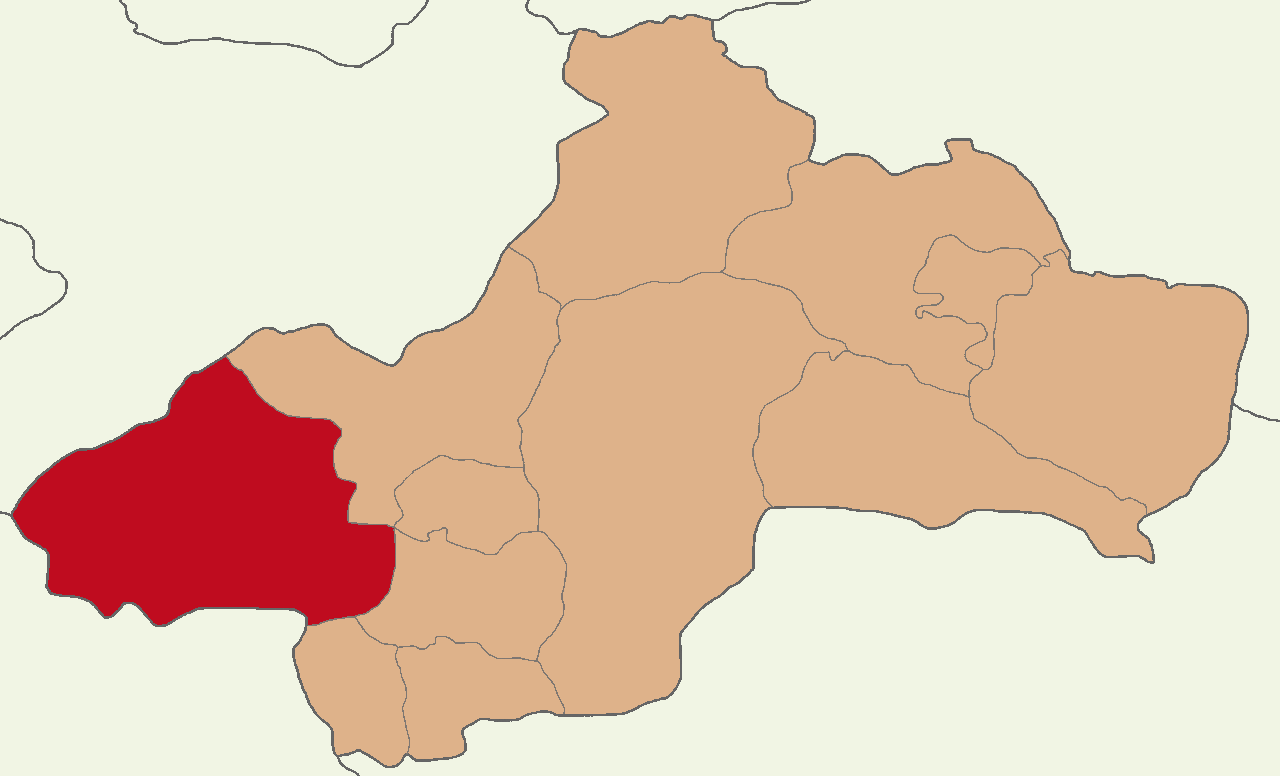
- Map showing Zile District in Tokat Province

- Location in Turkey
- Coordinates: 40°18′N 35°53′E
- Country: Turkey
- Province: Tokat
- Seat: Zile

Government
  - Kaymakam: Mehmet Ali Akyüz
- Area: 1,480 km^{2} (570 sq mi)
- Population (2022): 63,315
  - Density: 42.8/km^{2} (111/sq mi)
- Time zone: UTC+3 (TRT)
- Website: www.zile.gov.tr

Zile District is a district of the Tokat Province of Turkey. Its seat is the town of Zile. Its area is 1,480 km^{2}, and its population is 63,315 (2022).

== Composition ==
There is one municipality in Zile District:

- Zile

There are 114 villages in Zile District:

- Acıpınar
- Acısu
- Ağcakeçili
- Ağılcık
- Akdoğan
- Akgüller
- Akkılıç
- Alayurt
- Alıçözü
- Alibağı
- Alihoca
- Armutalan
- Ayvalı
- Bayırköy
- Belkaya
- Belpınar
- Binbaşıoğlu
- Boldacı
- Büyükaköz
- Büyükkarayün
- Büyükkozluca
- Büyüközlü
- Çakırcalı
- Çamdere
- Çapak
- Çayırköy
- Çayıroluğu
- Çeltek
- Çiçekpınarı
- Çiftlik
- Derebaşı
- Edeköy
- Elmacık
- Emirören
- Eskidağiçi
- Eskiderbent
- Evrenköy
- Fatih
- Göçenli
- Gölcük
- Gümüşkaş
- Güngörmez
- Güzelbeyli
- Hacılar
- Haramikışla
- Hasanağa
- Hatippınarı
- İğdir
- İmirtolu
- Karabalçık
- Karacaören
- Karakaya
- Karakuzu
- Karaşeyh
- Karşıpınar
- Karşıyaka
- Kazılı
- Kepez
- Kervansaray
- Kireçli
- Kırlar
- Kızılza
- Koçaş
- Korucuk
- Köylüürünü
- Kozdere
- Küçükaköz
- Küçükkarayün
- Küçükkozluca
- Küçüközlü
- Küplüce
- Kurşunlu
- Kuruçay
- Kurupınar
- Kuzalan
- Narlıkışla
- Olukman
- Osmanpınarı
- Özyurt
- Palanlı
- Reşadiye
- Salur
- Saraçköy
- Savcıköy
- Sekikışla
- Selamet
- Şeyhköy
- Şeyhnusrettin
- Sofular
- Söğütözü
- Süleymaniye
- Taşkıran
- Temecük
- Turgutalp
- Üçkaya
- Üçköy
- Uğurluören
- Ütük
- Üyük
- Uzunköy
- Uzunöz
- Yalınyazı
- Yalnızköy
- Yapalak
- Yaraş
- Yaylakent
- Yaylayolu
- Yenidağiçi
- Yeniderbent
- Yeniköy
- Yeşilce
- Yıldıztepe
- Yücepınar
- Yünlük
