= Van Zile House =

Historic house in New Jersey, United States

- U.S. National Register of Historic Places
- New Jersey Register of Historic Places
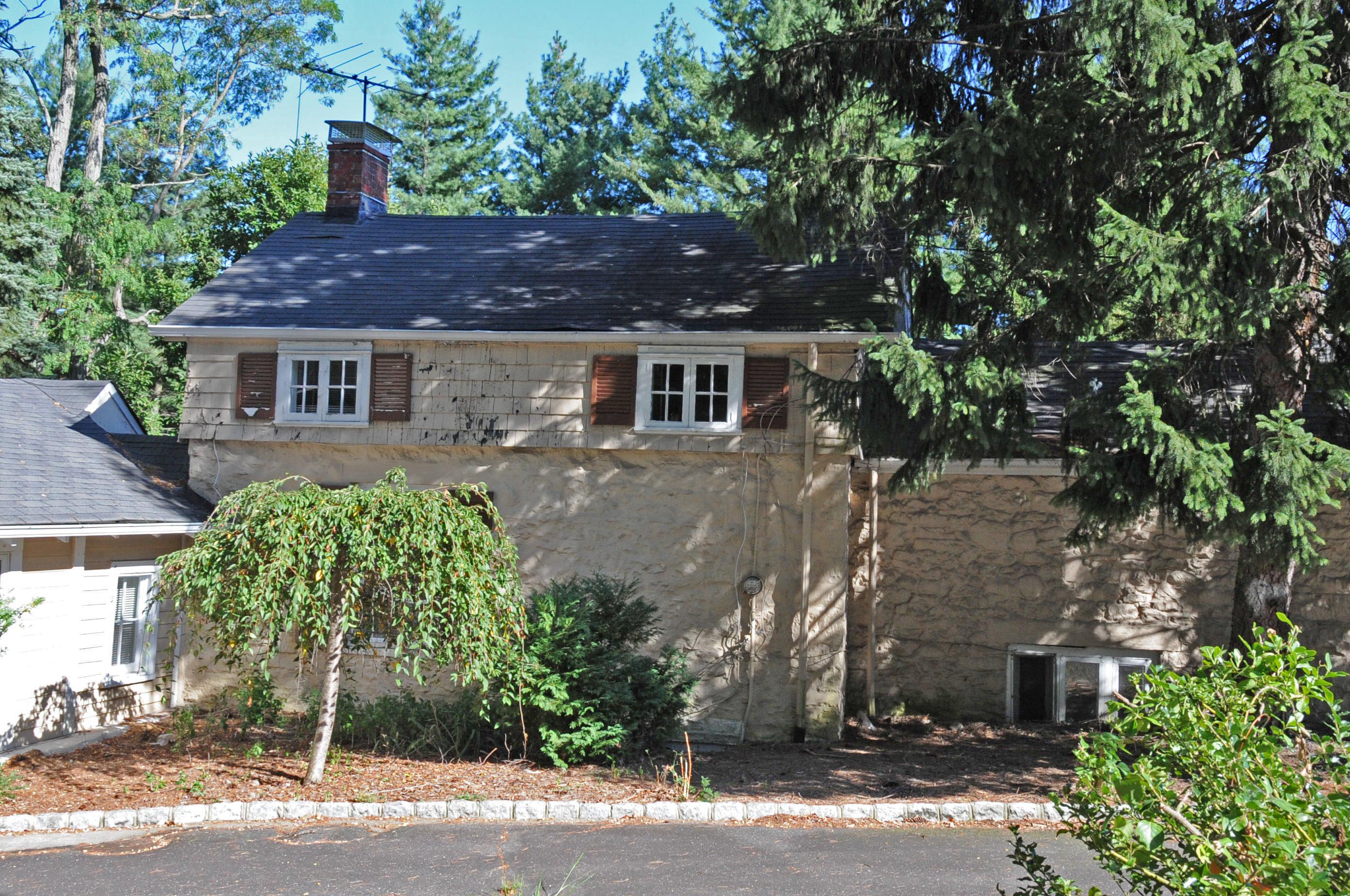

- Location within Bergen County, New Jersey Location within New Jersey Location within the United States
- Location: 714 Godwin Avenue, Midland Park, New Jersey
- Coordinates: 41°0′3″N 74°9′20″W
- Area: less than one acre
- Built: 1736
- Demolished: 2016
- MPS: Stone Houses of Bergen County TR
- NRHP reference No.: 83001579
- NJRHP No.: 578

Significant dates
- Added to NRHP: January 10, 1983
- Designated NJRHP: October 3, 1980

Van Zile House was located in Midland Park, Bergen County, New Jersey, United States. The house was built in 1736 and was added to the National Register of Historic Places on January 10, 1983. The house was one of a series of similar stone houses along the same county road, the others being across the municipal border in Wyckoff, New Jersey. An LLC purchased the property and submitted preliminary plans for demolition in June 2018. The borough's leadership failed to provide any zoning or planning protections for the house, and in spite of the efforts of historic preservationists, the house was demolished the week of May 5, 2019 in favor of high-density housing. No components of the house were saved, nor were any of the 100 to 200-year-old trees that covered most of the property.

== See also ==
- National Register of Historic Places listings in Bergen County, New Jersey
