= Süreyyabey Dam =

Coordinates: 40.0438°N 35.5490°E

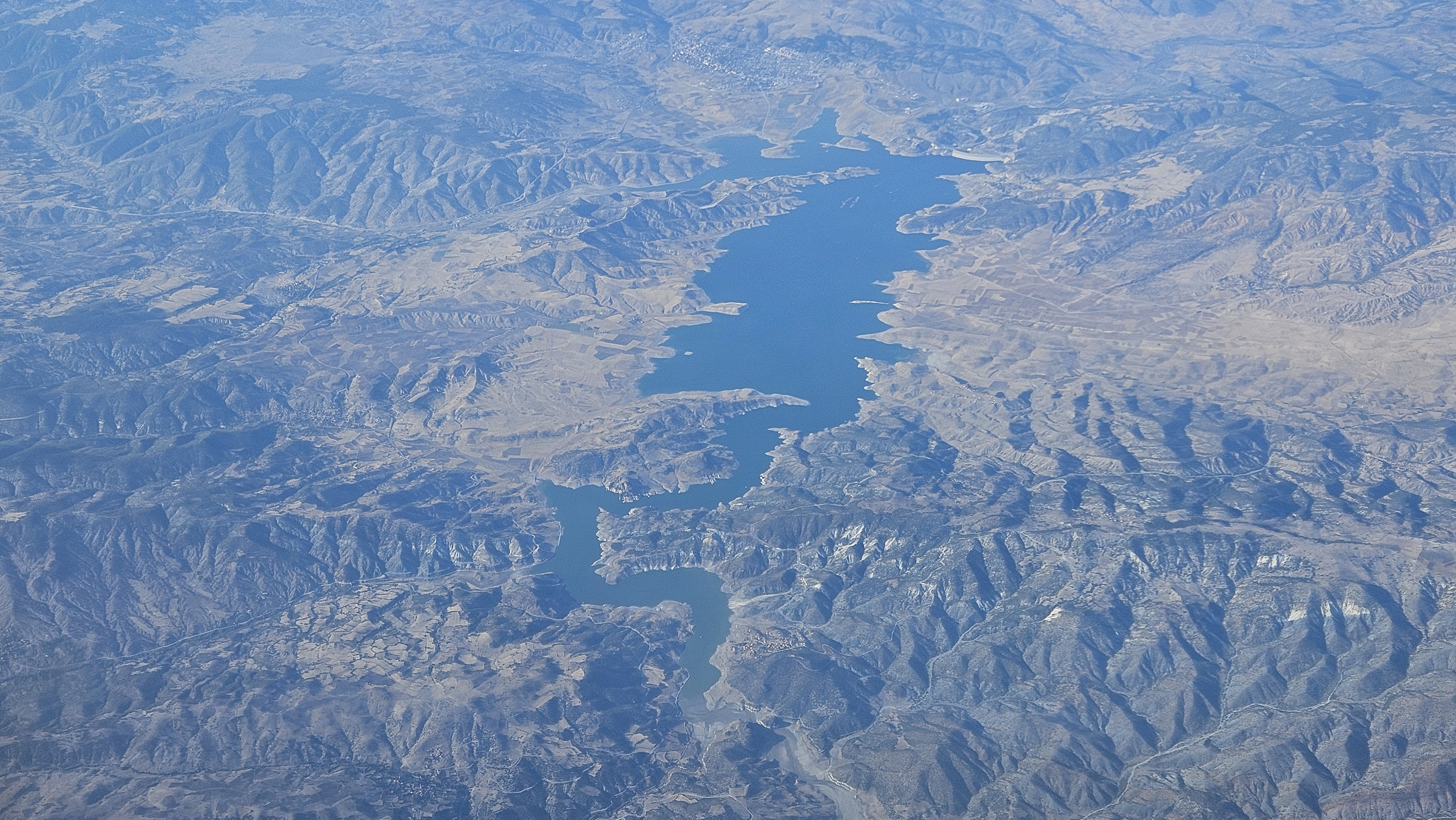
- Aerial view of the Süreyyabey Dam
- Interactive map of Süreyyabey Dam
- Location: Turkey
- Construction began: 1996
- Opening date: 2004

Dam and spillways
- Impounds: Çekerek River
- Height: 113 m (371 ft)

Reservoir
- Total capacity: 131,000,000 m^{3} (106,203 acre⋅ft)

Power Station
- Installed capacity: 14 MW
- Annual generation: 40 GWh

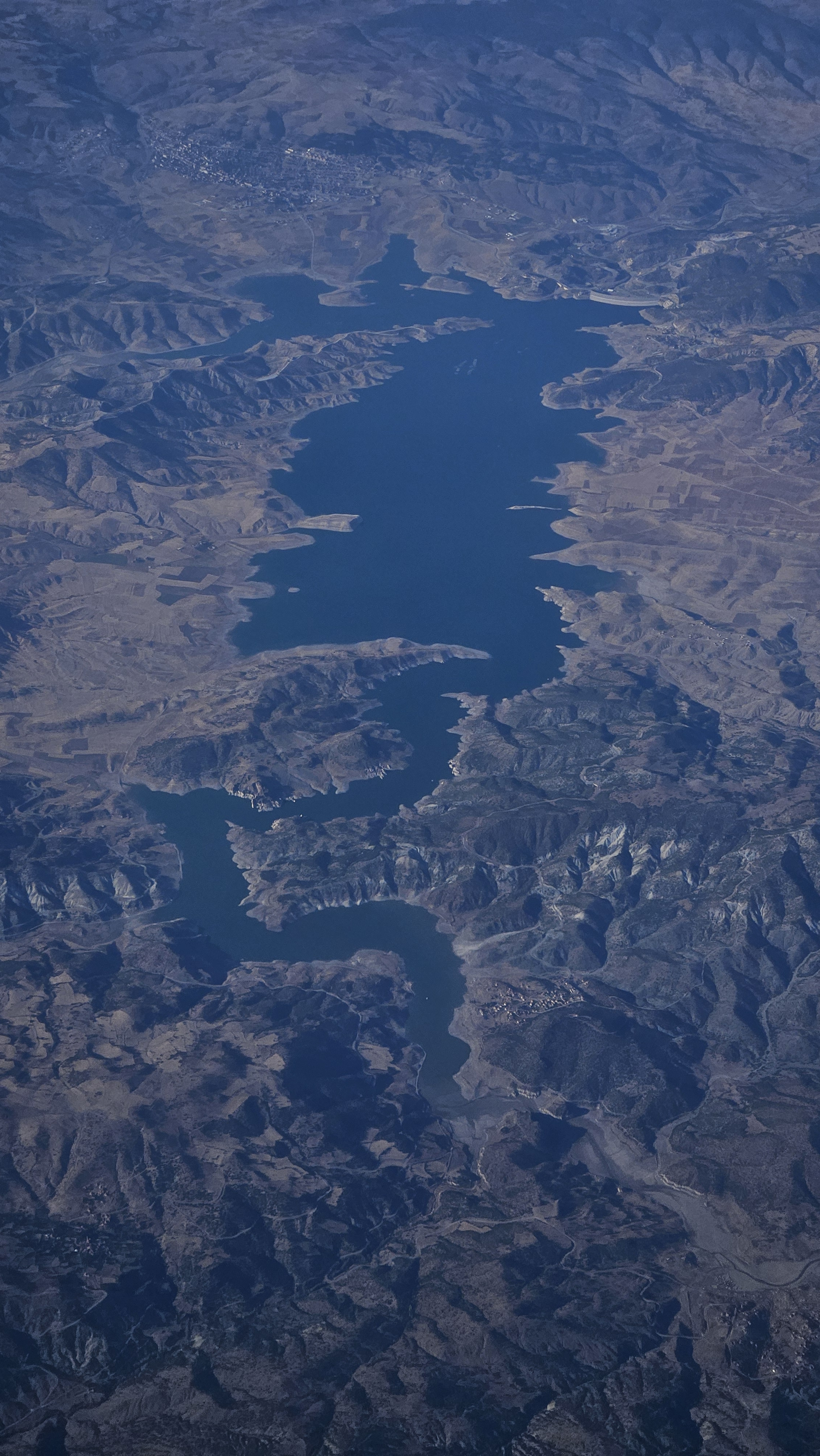
Aerial view of the Süreyyabey Dam

Süreyyabey Dam is a dam on the Çekerek River in Yozgat Province, Turkey. The development was backed by the Turkish State Hydraulic Works.

== See also ==
- List of dams and reservoirs in Turkey
