= Babakale Castle =

Castle in Babakale, Turkey

- Babakale Kalesi
- Cape Baba; Near Babakale, Ayvacık, Çanakkale Province in Turkey
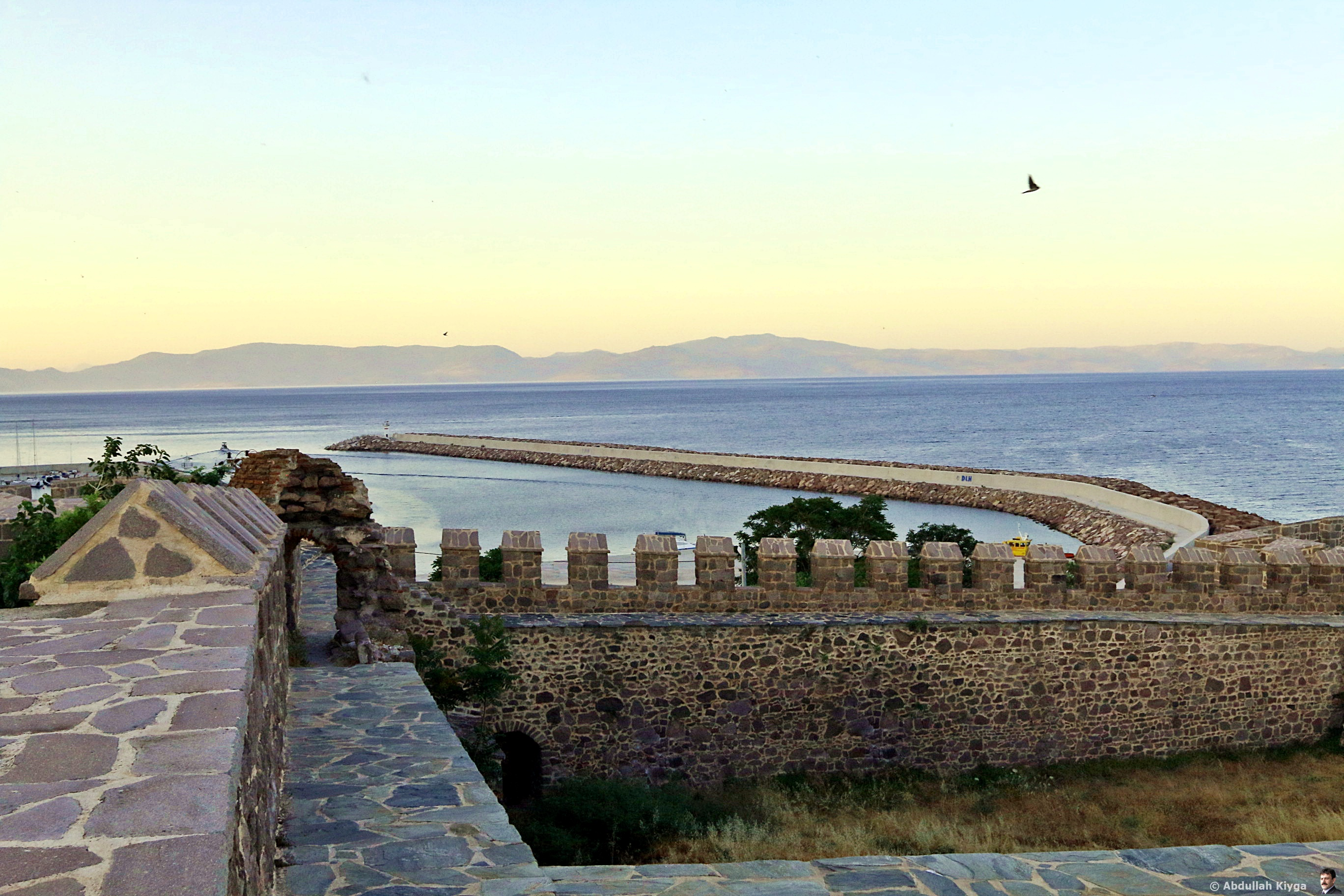
- Babakale Castle in 2015 after restoration and port breakwater in the background.

Site information
- Type: Castle
- Condition: Restored

Location
- Location within Turkey
- Coordinates: 39°28′46″N 26°03′51″E
- Length: approx. 38 m × 76 m (125 ft × 249 ft)

Site history
- Built: 1729; 297 years ago
- Materials: Ashlar

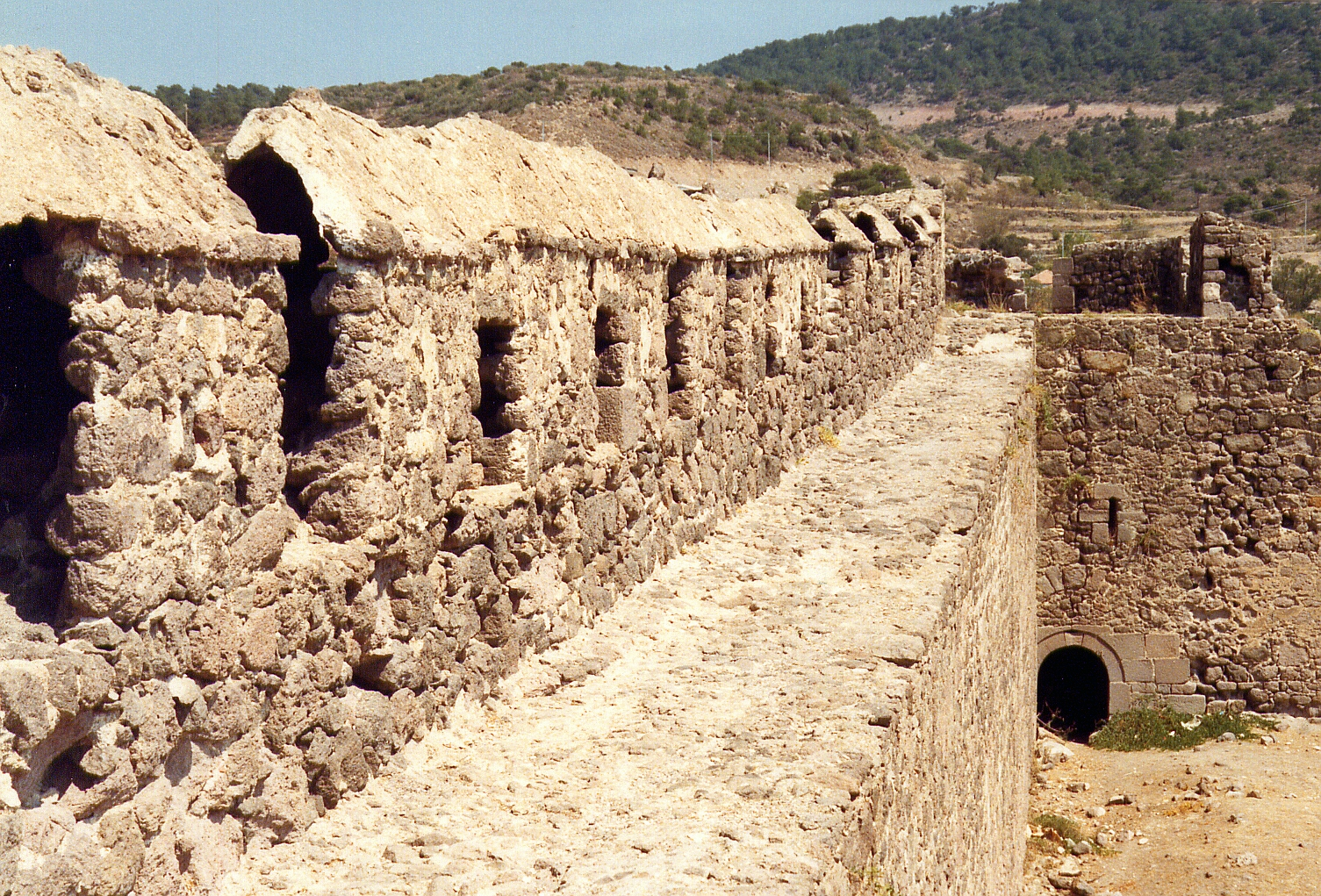
Remains of Babakale Castle in 1990. Battlement and the hidden small opening (right bottom).

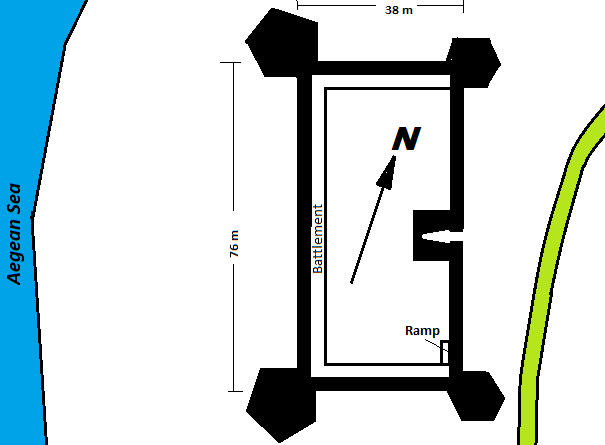
Floor plan of Babakale Castle

Babakale Castle (Turkish: Babakale Kalesi, Ottoman Turkish: Hırzü’l-Bahr) is an 18th-century fortification at Babakale, Ayvacık, the westernmost point of mainland Turkey. It was built during the Ottoman era.

== Geography and history ==
Babakale Castle is situated on a hill at Cape Baba, the westernmost point of mainland Turkey, in Babakale, Ayvacık in Çanakkale Province. The castle takes its name from the cape. The castle was built to protect the location from pirates. According to the inscription found above the main gate, it was constructed during the reign of Ottoman Sultan Ahmed III by Kapudan Pasha (Grand admiral) Kaymak Mustafa Pasha between AH 1135–1141 (1722–1729 CE). Inside the castle, there was a mosque, a hamam (bathhouse), a fountain and some other buildings, which were constructed at the same time.

The castle and the adjacent port were important for the anchorage and supply of the Ottoman Navy. The fountain, for which water was brought from 5 km (3.1 mi) away, supplied water for the naval fleet before it set sail on campaigns.

== Architecture ==
The castle has a rectangular plan with dimensions of approx. 38 m × 76 m (125 ft × 249 ft) having a watchtower on each corner. It is oriented northwest to southeast with the seashore to the southwest. The watchtowers on the landward side have a hexagonal prism form while the watchtowers overlooking the sea are much larger and are in the form of pentagonal prisms. The main gate, which has a marble inscription above it, is situated in the middle of the north-eastern curtain wall. An L-shaped pincer gate in a covered structure behind the pointed arch gate leads to the castle's interior courtyard. The pincer gate features one large barrel vaulted niche at each side and above where guards would have been located. The gate opens to the castle's interior through a wide, tall, semi-circular arched portal. A finial relief is found on the keystone of the inner portal. A small additional hidden opening is situated next to the watchtower on the south-eastern curtain wall. The battlements are reached by a ramp in the southern corner. Access to the four watchtowers is through the battlements. The embrasures between the merlons of the watchtower battlements were constructed at an angle that widens outwards making it suitable for firing cannons.

Inside the castle, to the left of the entrance and adjacent to the north-eastern wall, there is a pointed arch fountain with a water reservoir. A second fountain has been added next it. Only the traces of the foundations of the mosque and the hamam are visible today, but the remains of stone pedestal and brick shoes have survived from the mosque's minaret, which was situated on the castle wall.

== Today ==
The castle hosted international festivals in conjunction with Lesbos in Greece in 1998, 1999 and 2000. Due to excavations carried out in 2001, no later events could be held. It was suggested that the 27 houses, which existed inside the castle in the past, would be rebuilt for tourism purposes on the foundation unearthed during the excavations.

== Gallery ==
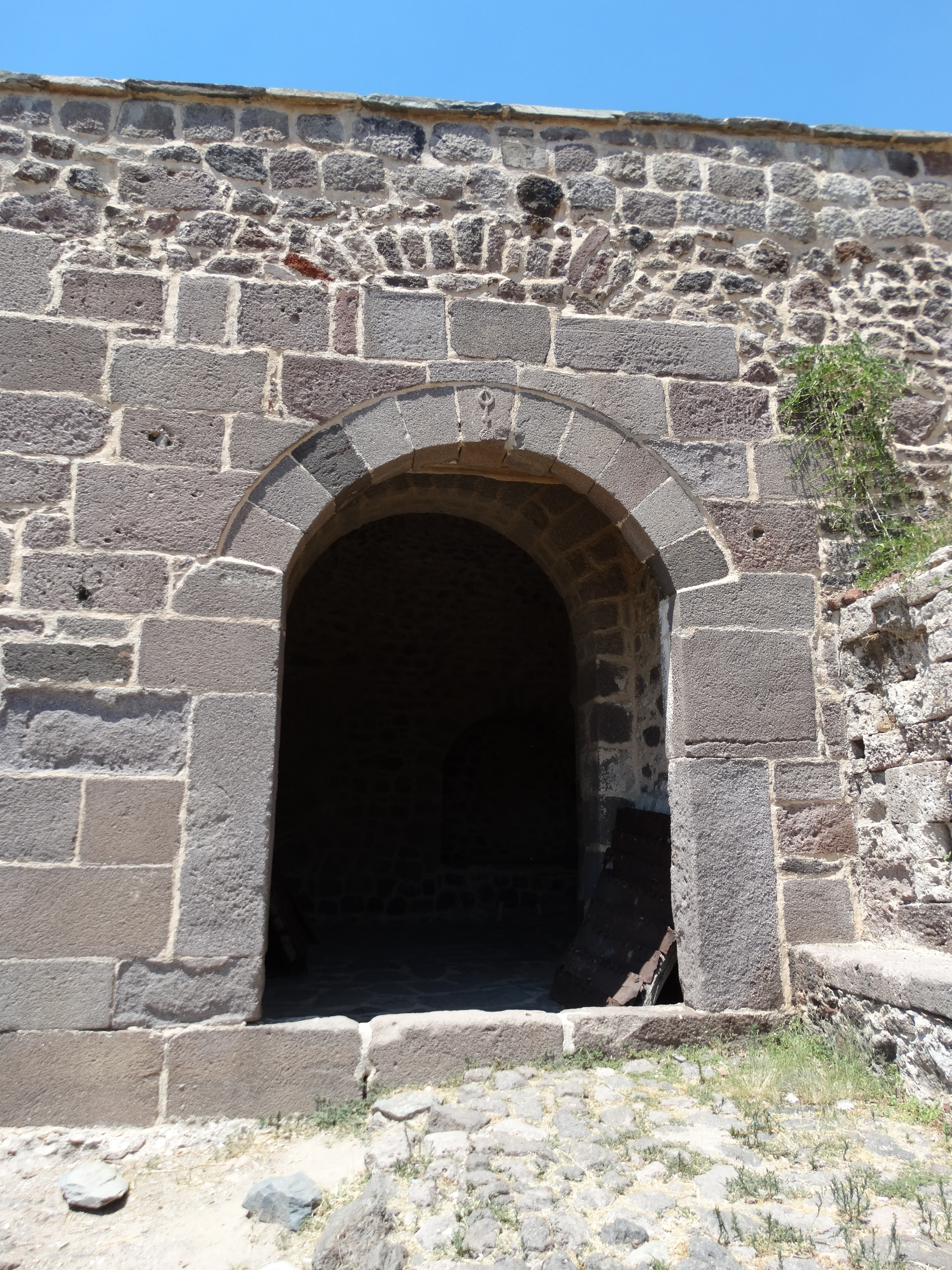

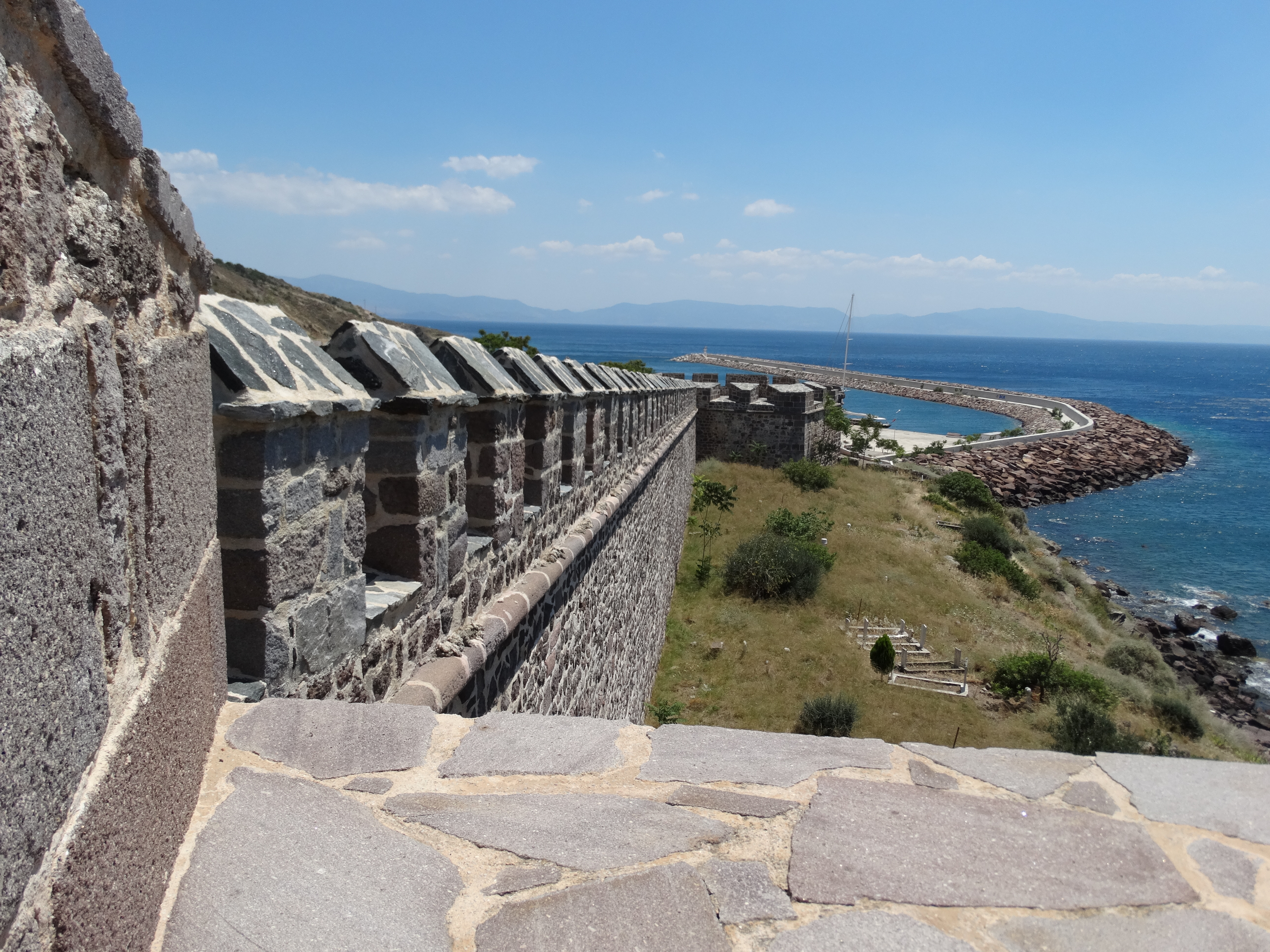

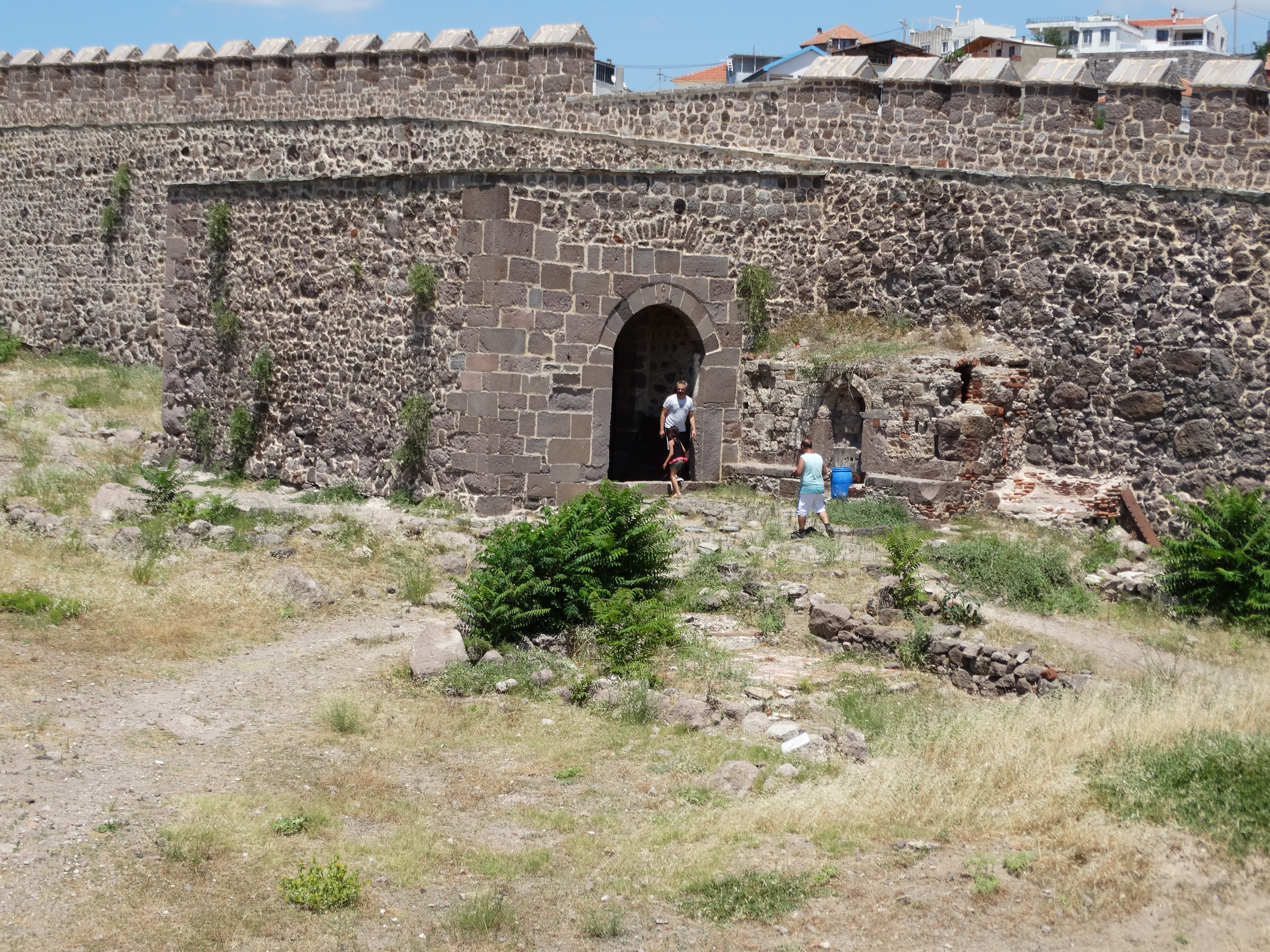

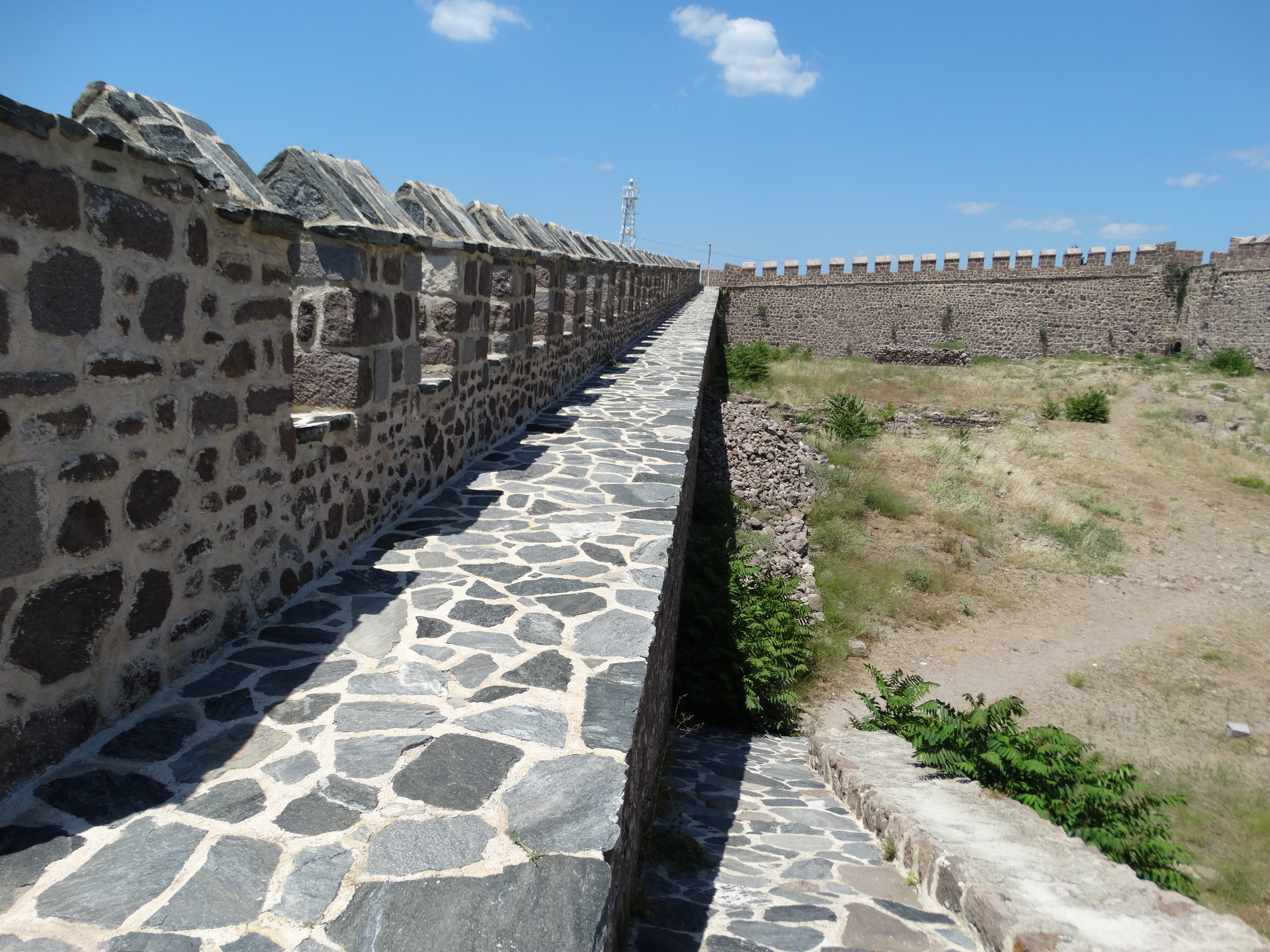

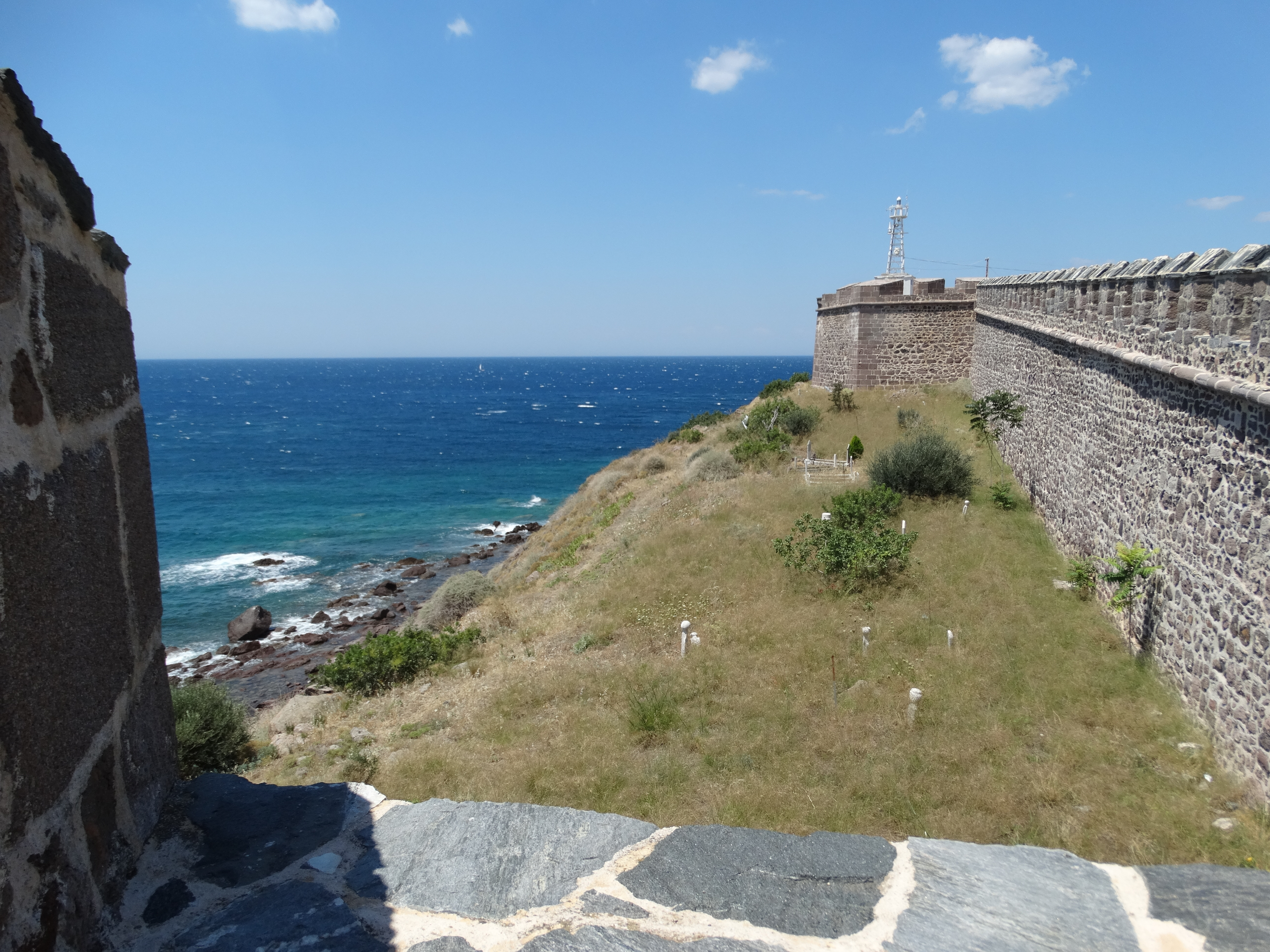

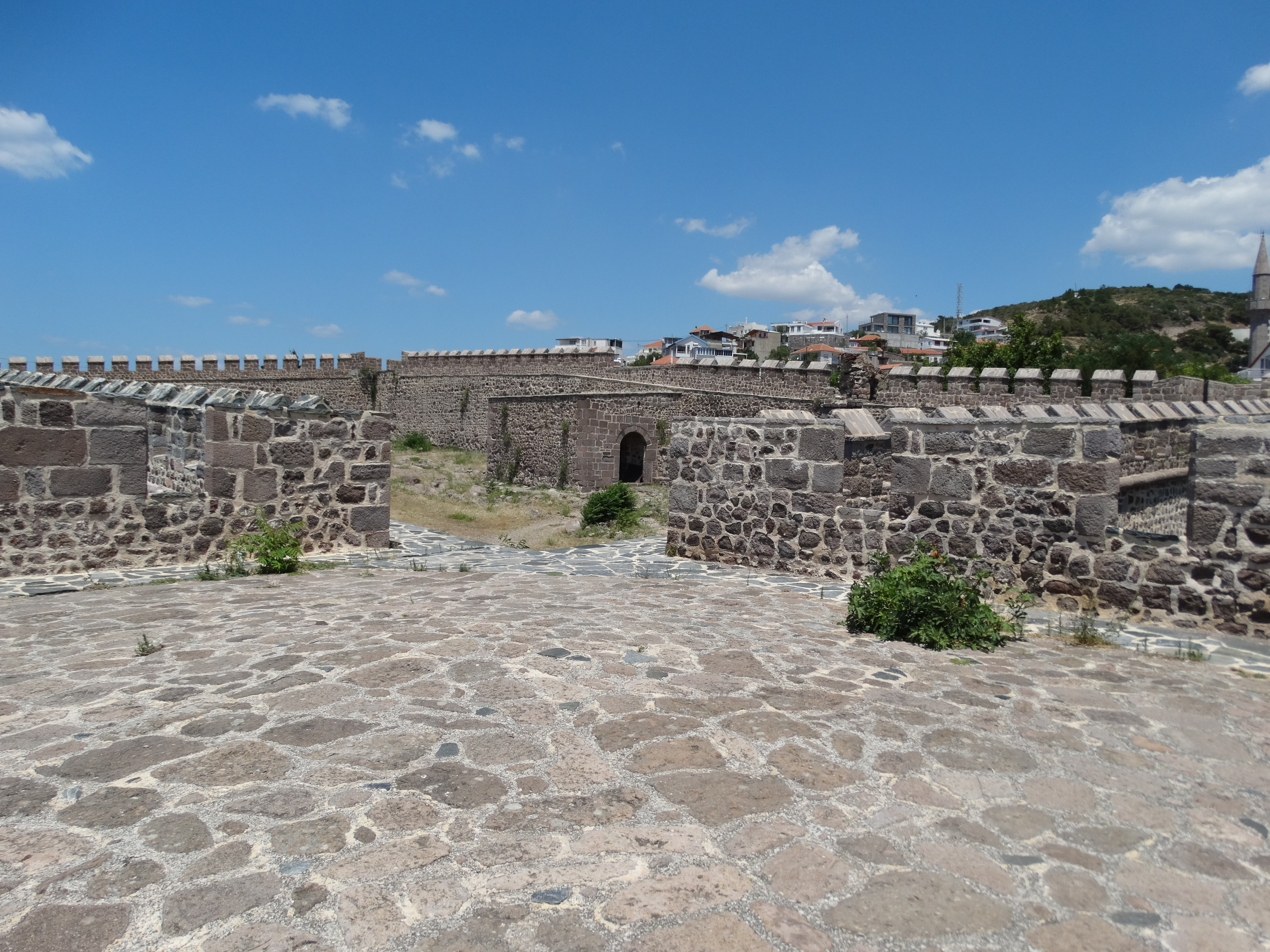

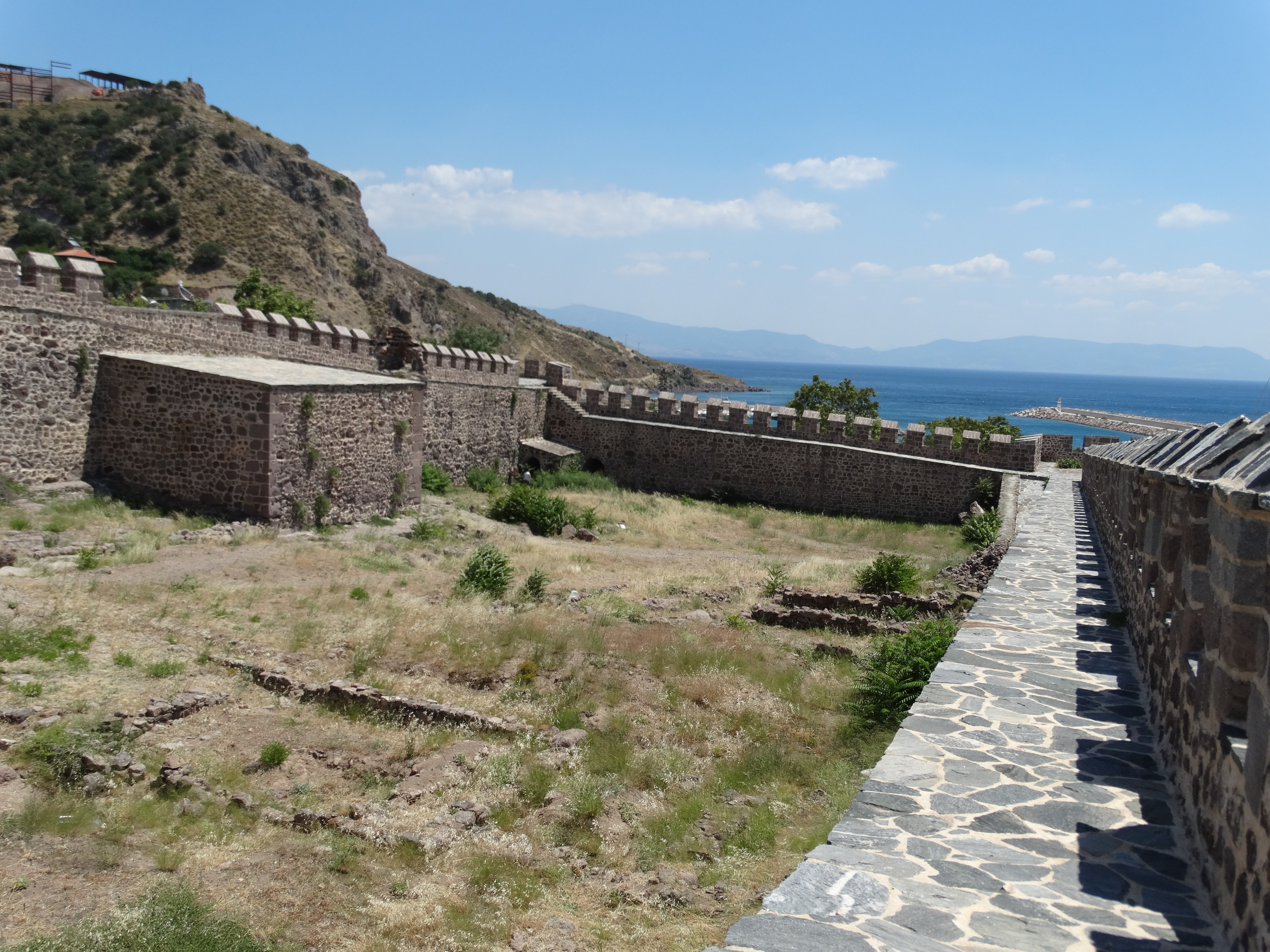
