= Jaroslav Pešán =

Czech soldier (1912–1972)

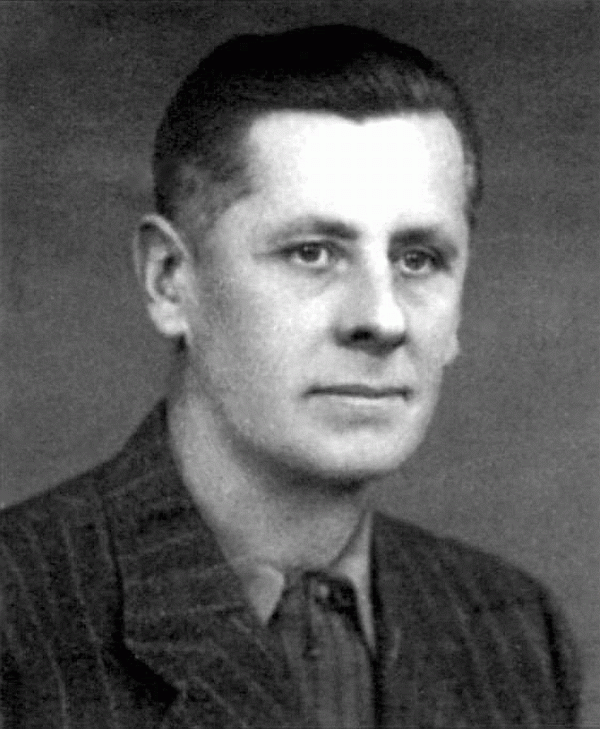
- Pešán in 1951
- Born: 28 January 1912; Klášter Hradiště nad Jizerou, Bohemia, Austria-Hungary
- Died: 11 August 1972 (aged 60); Brno, Czechoslovakia
- Known for: World War II veteran, resistance fighter

Jaroslav Pešán (28 January 1912 – 11 August 1972) was a Czech soldier and paratrooper. He was a World War II veteran and a member of the Resistance in the Protectorate of Bohemia and Moravia.

Pešán fought at the Battle of France. Later, he operated as a member of Platinum-Pewter, a military-intelligence parachute platoon, across the Nazi-occupied Protectorate of Bohemia and Moravia, today's Czech Republic.

One of his platoon colleagues was Jaroslav Klemeš, one of the longest-living and best-known Czechoslovak World War II veterans.

== Youth ==
Pešán was born on 28 January 1912 in Klášter Hradiště nad Jizerou, Bohemia, Austria-Hungary (present Czech Republic). His father Emil was a shoemaker and farmer by occupation. His mother Gabriela, born as Macharovská, was a homemaker. Jaroslav had seven siblings.

Pešán attended a vocational brewer training. Subsequently, he worked as a brewer up until the beginning of his military service in 1933. Although he started military service in Mladá Boleslav, he reallocated to Prague's infantry regiment after completing basic training. As Pešán finished the military service, he returned to his brewing occupation. In 1938, Pešán shifted to a sommelier position.

== In exile ==
In October 1939, Pešán headed to France. However, to be able to do so, he had to walk across Slovakia, Hungary, the rest of the Balkans, Turkey, and Syria. From Syria, he sailed to France. When finally in France, Pešán reported to the foreign section of the Czechoslovak Army. On 4 January 1940, in Agde, he was assigned to the 1st infantry regiment of the Czechoslovak Army. While he was part of this regiment, he fought in the Battle of France.

After the fall of France, Pešán evacuated to the United Kingdom. In the United Kingdom, he joined the 1st infantry battalion. On 1 December 1940, he passed driving tests and was promoted to Gefreiter, a second rank. Between 21 February and 27 March 1942, he passed sabotage and parachuting courses. From 26 October to July 1942, he completed courses focused on industrial sabotage, receipt of aircraft, civilian employment, conspiracy, and further aspects of parachuting. During this period, he was promoted to a corporal rank and became a member of the platoon Pewter and later the Platinum-Pewter. In August 1944, Pešán moved to a station in Bari, Italy, where he was waiting for further orders.

== Deployment ==
Pešán was deployed as a paratrooper in the area of Nasavrky on 17 February 1945. Along with his partners from Platinum-Pewter, he began executing orders related to military intelligence and also the organization and receipts of secret air shipments. He executed most of these actions in the area of the Bohemian-Moravian Highlands.

== After World War II ==
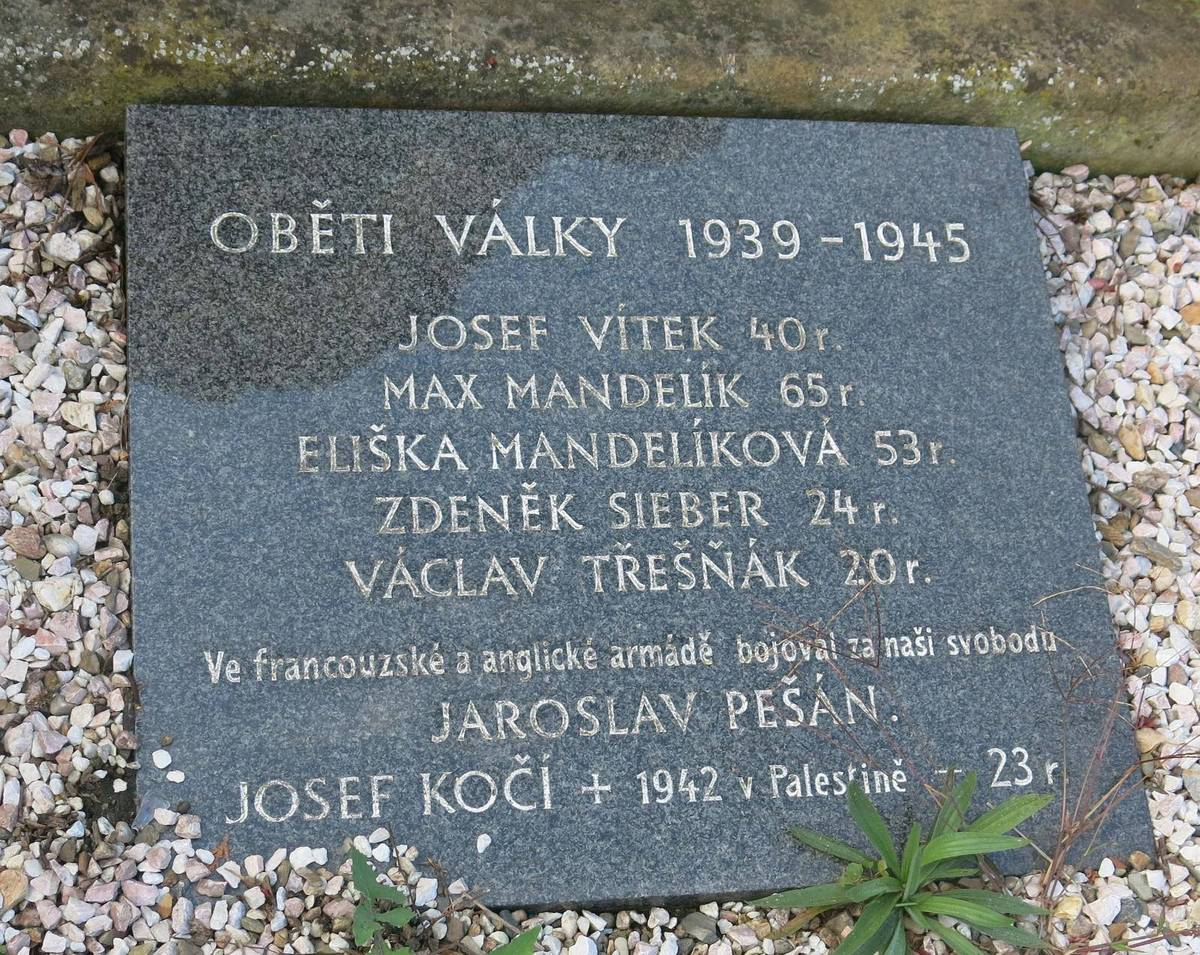
War memorial in Klášter Hradiště nad Jizerou

On 8 May 1945, Pešán was promoted to a second lieutenant. During the same year, he married and had two children. Continuously, he worked his way up to the rank of senior lieutenant of infantry. During this period, he worked across various military positions, including the commander of the 71st parachute battalion's paratrooper school or at the Grande Prague's headquarters. On 23 October 1948, Pešán was promoted to the captain of infantry. He served as the chief of a military garrison at Mimoň. Soon, he was promoted to the staff captain rank.

The Communist Party of Czechoslovakia seized power during 1948. For political purposes, numerous World War II veterans were dismissed from the military service. Pešán was dismissed on 31 August 1951. He was not given any justification for the dismissal. Contrariwise, the party banned him from obtaining any employment other than in the heavy industry, mining, or agriculture. Additionally, Pešán and his family, including his two young children, were given 24 hours to abandon their home. The government took their property without offering any compensation. Later on, he was able to obtain employment as a construction worker and then as a driver. After eight years, in 1959, he was permitted to start working within the Veterinary Research Institute in Brno. Pešán died on 11 August 1972.

In 1992, the Czech government recognized Pešán's contribution to anti-Nazi resistance. In memoriam, he was promoted to the rank of lieutenant colonel of infantry and received several awards and recognitions. In 1995, he was also given a memorial plate publicly displayed in a proximity of the brewery in Klášter Hradiště nad Jizerou.

His son is Jaroslav Pešán, a veterinary and politician. The son was a member of the Parliament's lower house, the Chamber of Deputies of the Czech Republic. He represented the ODS.

== Honours ==
- 1944 – Commemorative Medal of Czechoslovak Army Abroad for fighting for the French and British armies
- 1945 – Czechoslovak Was Cross 1939-1945 for great service while in exile
- 1945 – The Czechoslovak Military Medal "For the Merit" 1st Class for actions done outside of the battlefield
- 1945 – Czechoslovak Medal for Bravery before the Enemy
- 1950 – Decoration of Czechoslovak Partisan for guerilla activities performed against the Nazi regime
