= Horní Bukovina =

- Municipality
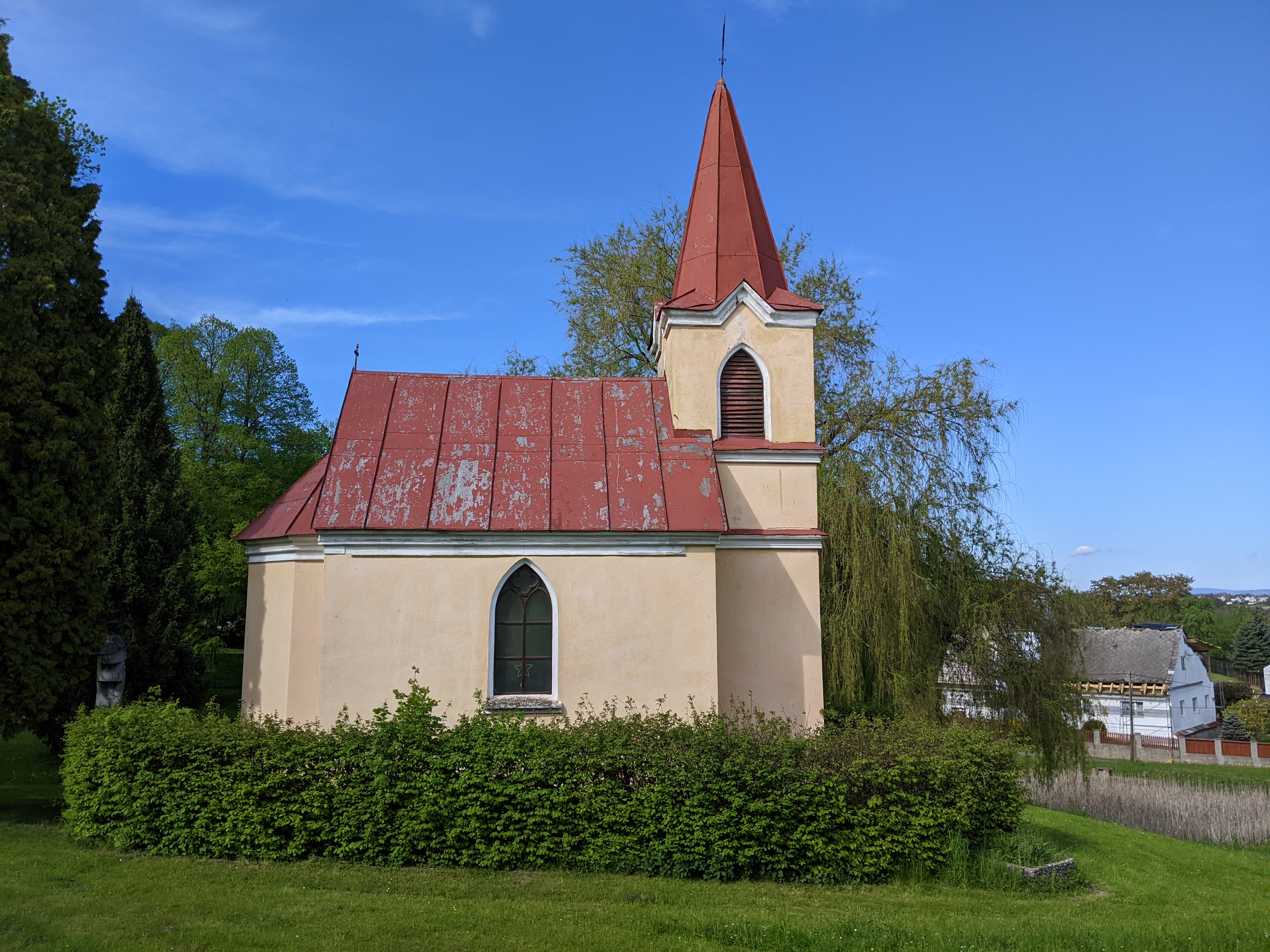
- Chapel of Saint John of Nepomuk

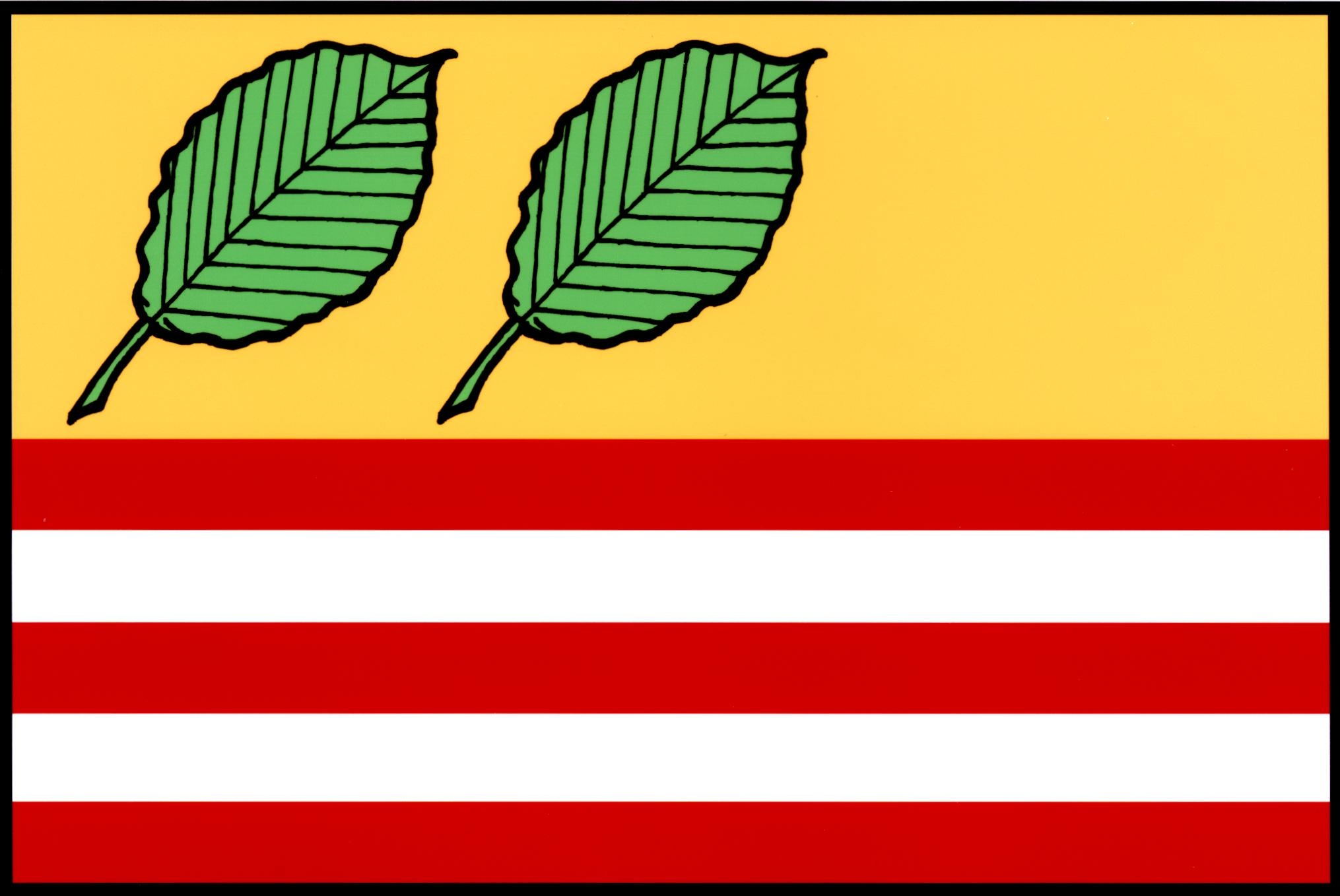
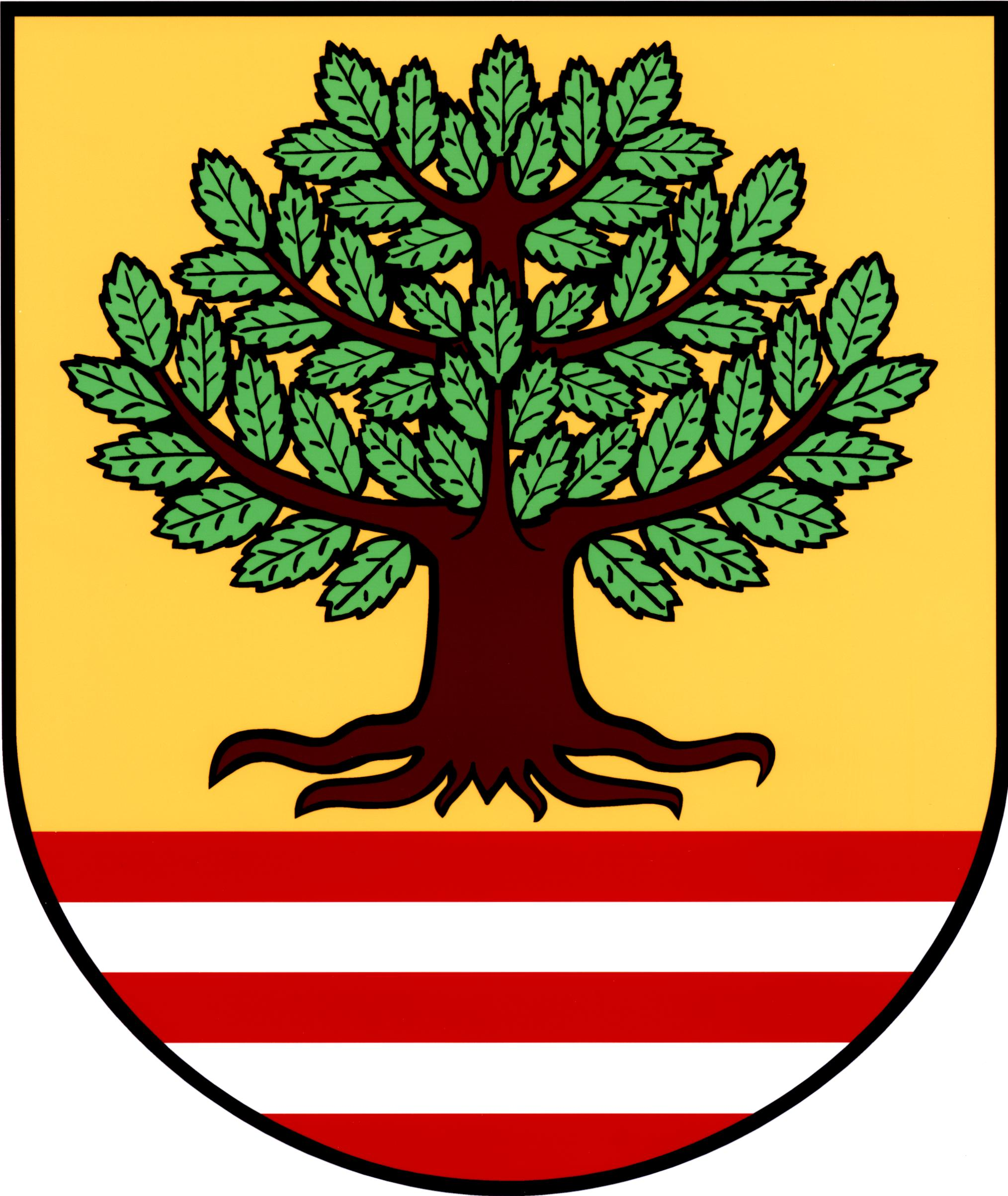
- Flag Coat of arms

- Location in the Czech Republic
- Coordinates: 50°32′36″N 14°55′34″E
- Country: Czech Republic
- Region: Central Bohemian
- District: Mladá Boleslav
- First mentioned: 1399

Area
  - Total: 5.54 km^{2} (2.14 sq mi)
- Elevation: 290 m (950 ft)

Population (2026-01-01)
  - Total: 292
  - Density: 52.7/km^{2} (137/sq mi)
- Time zone: UTC+1 (CET)
  - Summer (DST): UTC+2 (CEST)
- Postal code: 295 01
- Website: www.hornibukovina.cz

Horní Bukovina is a municipality and village in Mladá Boleslav District in the Central Bohemian Region of the Czech Republic. It has about 300 inhabitants.

== Administrative division ==
Horní Bukovina consists of two municipal parts (in brackets population according to the 2021 census):

- Horní Bukovina (133)
- Dolní Bukovina (105)

== Etymology ==
The name Bukovina means 'beech forest' in Czech. The prefixes horní and dolní mean 'upper' and 'lower'.

== Geography ==
Horní Bukovina is located about 13 kilometres (8 mi) north of Mladá Boleslav and 25 km (16 mi) south of Liberec. It lies in the Jizera Table. The highest point is at 310 m (1,020 ft) above sea level. The Zábrdka Stream flows through the municipality.

== History ==
The first written mention of Bukovina is from 1399. The village was a property of the monastery in Klášter Hradiště nad Jizerou, until the monastery was burned down in 1420. The next owners of Bukovina are unknown. In 1556, when Horní Bukovina and Dolní Bukovina were called Bukovina a Podbukovina, the two villages were bought by Jiří of Labouň. His family sold the villages to Václav Budovec of Budov in 1612. However, his properties were confiscated as a result of the Battle of White Mountain. Horní Bukovina and Dolní Bukovina were acquired by Albrecht von Wallenstein in 1622. From that year until the establishment of an independent municipality in 1848, the two villages were owned by the Waldstein family as part of the Mnichovo Hradiště estate.

== Demographics ==
Historical population

Year	Pop.	±%
1869	497	—
1880	515	+3.6%
1890	517	+0.4%
1900	480	−7.2%
1910	480	+0.0%

Year	Pop.	±%
1921	448	−6.7%
1930	385	−14.1%
1950	260	−32.5%
1961	310	+19.2%
1970	235	−24.2%

Year	Pop.	±%
1980	216	−8.1%
1991	204	−5.6%
2001	206	+1.0%
2011	225	+9.2%
2021	238	+5.8%

Source: Censuses

== Transport ==
There are no railways or major roads passing through the municipality.

== Sport ==
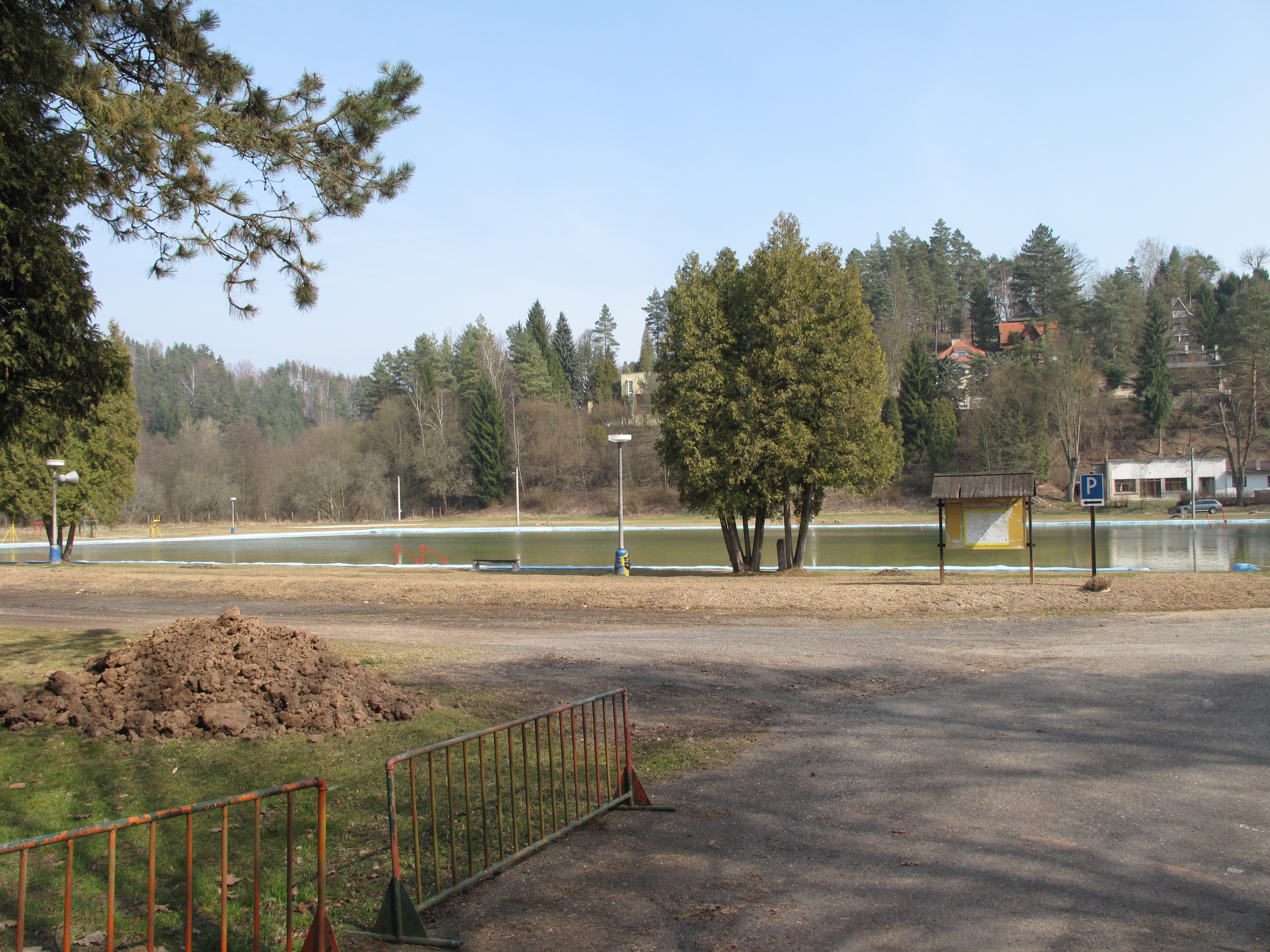
Swimming pool in Dolní Bukovina

Dolní Bukovina is known for an outdoor swimming pool that was built already in 1937.

== Sights ==
The only protected cultural monument in the municipality is a farmyard from the beginning of the 19th century, called Kristiánov. It consists of several Empire agricultural buildings.

A landmark of Horní Bukovina is the Chapel of Saint John of Nepomuk. It was built in 1888.
