= Pincer gate =

Type of gate in a fortification

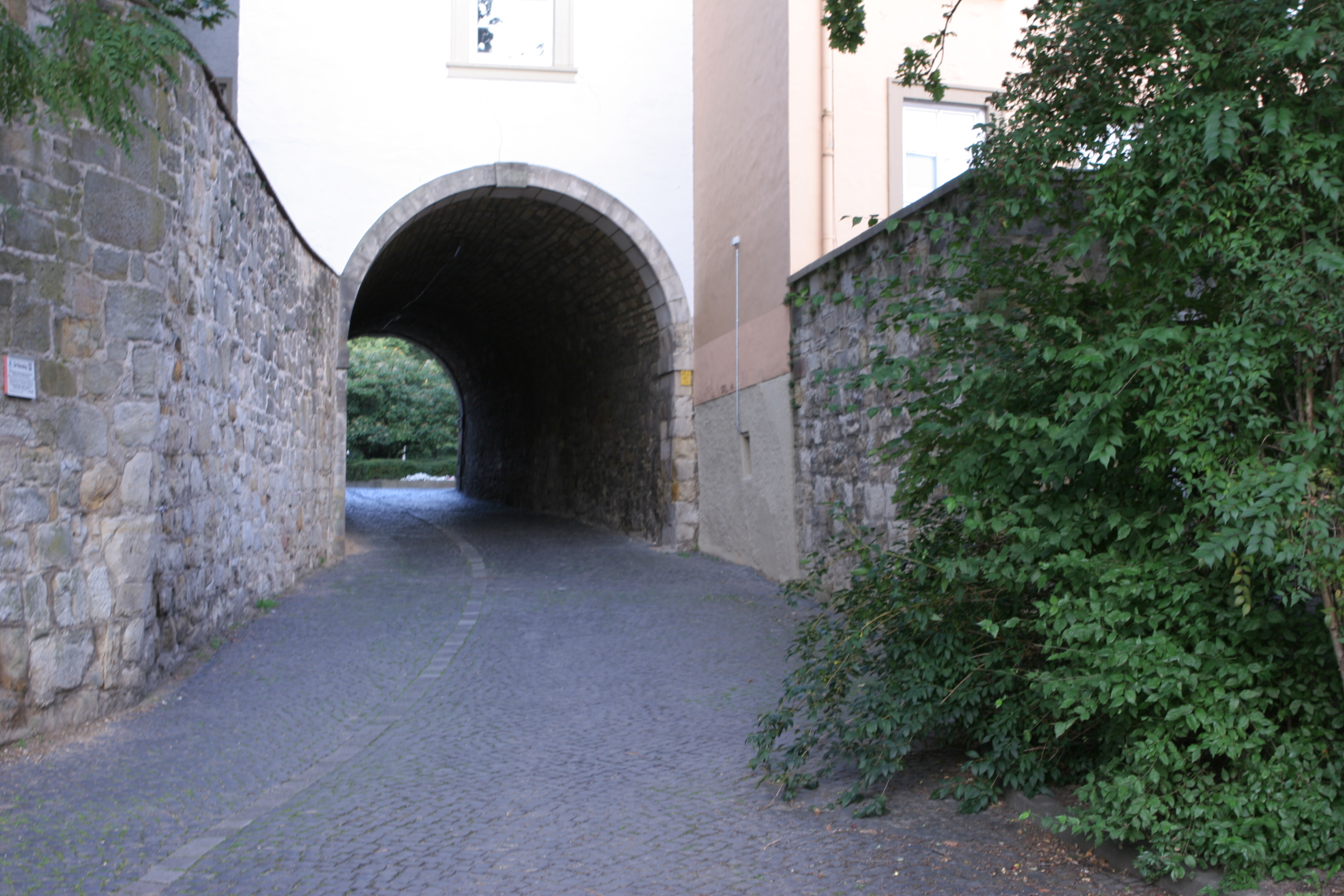
Northwestern pincer gate of the Hildesheim Cathedral Courtyard

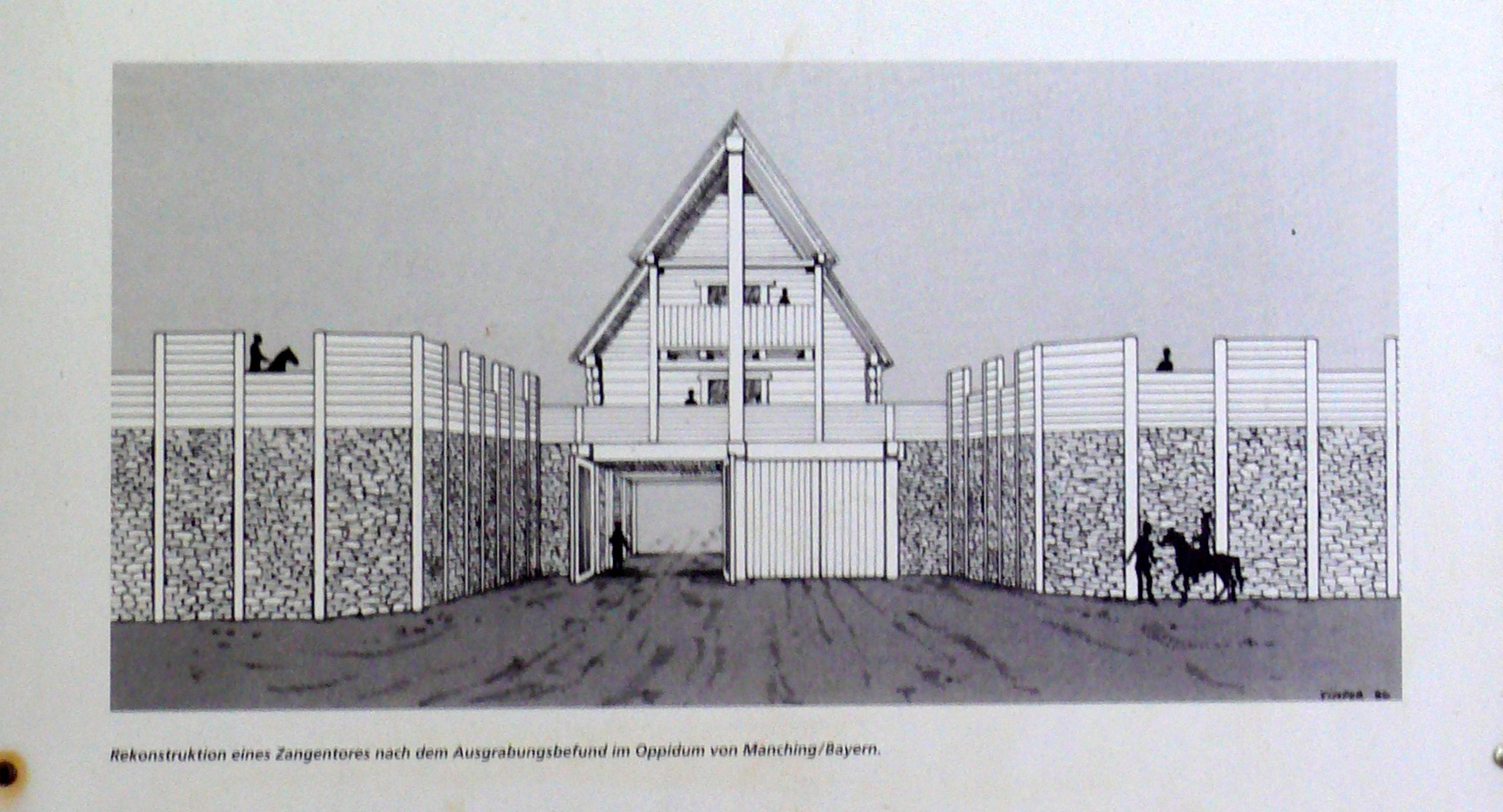
Artist's impression of a pincer gate (information board at the Oppidum Finsterlohr)

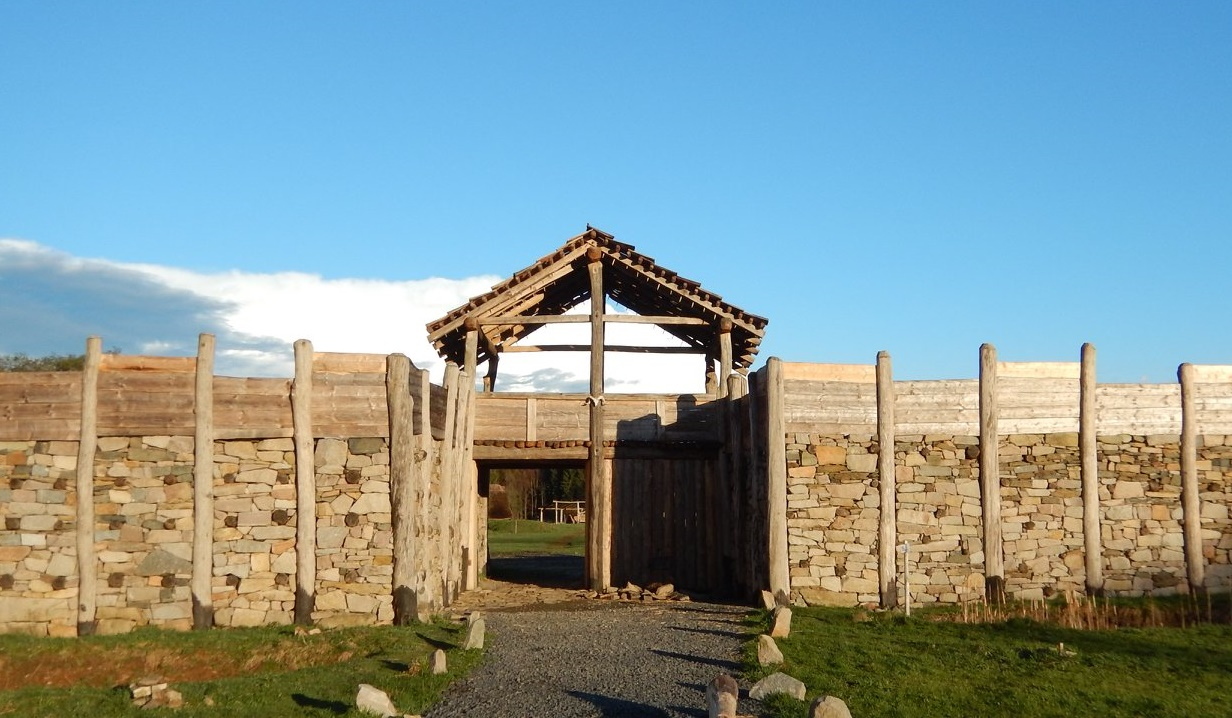
Reconstruction of Celtic pincer gate (1st century BC) in Země Keltů, Nasavrky, Czech Republic

A pincer gate (German: Zangentor) is a gate in a fortification that is deeply embedded between two inward angled exterior walls. Those wishing to enter the fort have to approach what is in effect a sunken road and, if hostile, can be attacked from both side walls in a pincer fashion.

Pincer gates were already being used in Urnfield and Celtic fortification in Central Europe and may also be seen in Early Medieval circular ramparts. They were common well into the High Middle Ages.

== Literature ==
- Horst Wolfgang Böhme, Reinhard Friedrich, Barbara Schock-Werner: Wörterbuch der Burgen, Schlösser und Festungen. Philipp Reclam, Stuttgart, 2004, ISBN 3-15-010547-1, pp. 241–242.

== See also ==
- Chamber gate
