= Chamber gate =

Gateway system on medieval town fortifications and castles

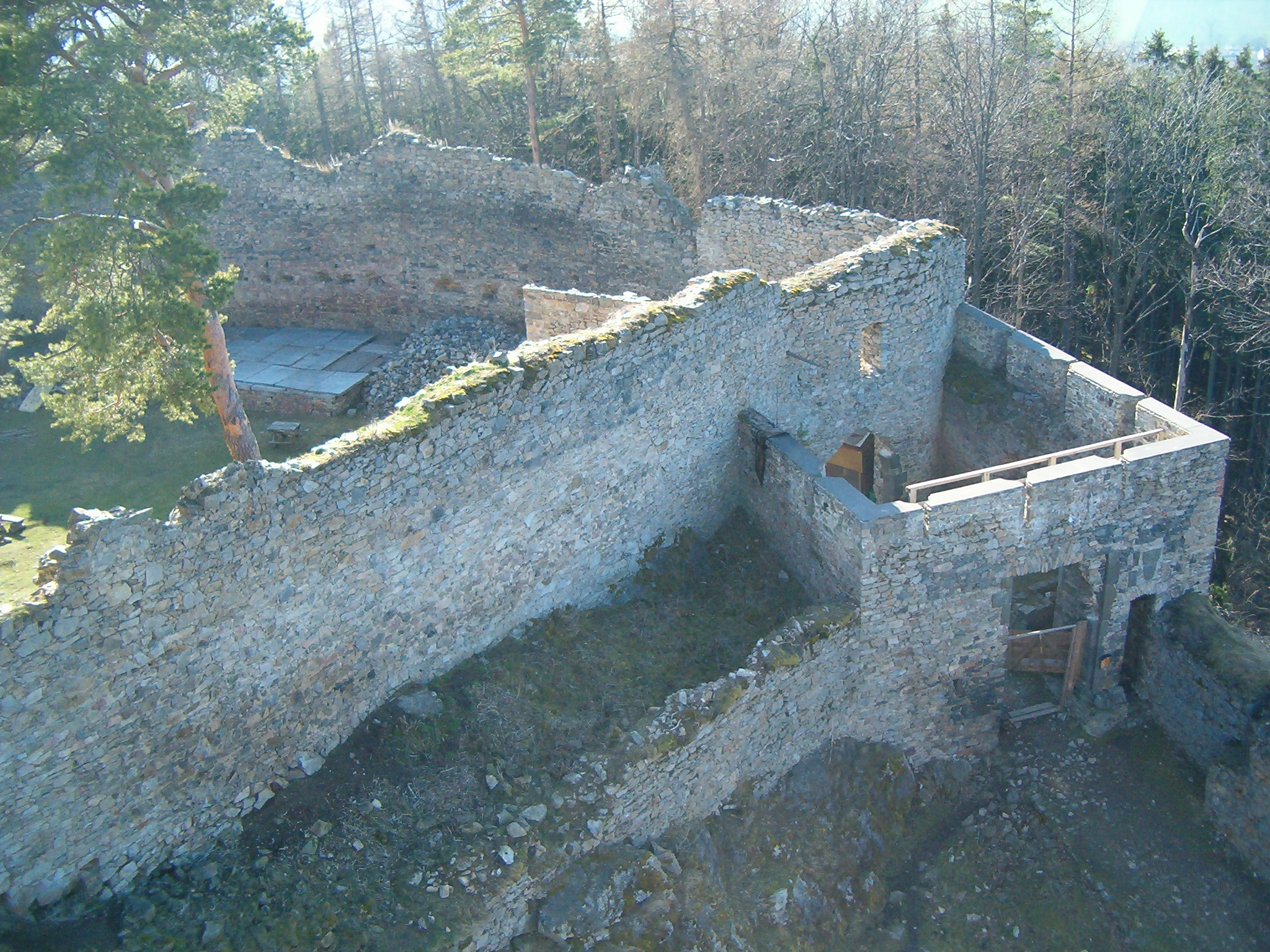
Chamber gate at Helfenburk Castle

A chamber gate (German: Kammertor) is a type of gateway system on medieval town fortifications and castles that comprises at least two successive gateways linked by an easily defended passageway between two walls. Chamber gates can be built in the space between two enceintes or built into an enceinte as an independent gateway. Because relatively few fortifications are surrounded by a complete second defensive wall, chamber gates are frequently found in short Zwinger sections.

Chamber gates were often integrated into existing buildings and protected by the defensive levels above them, by defensive towers or by portcullises and drawbridges.

== Literature ==
- Friedrich-Wilhelm Krahe: Burgen des deutschen Mittelalters. Grundriss-Lexikon. Flechsig, Wurzburg, 2000, ISBN 3-88189-360-1, p. 26.

== See also ==
- Pincer gate
