= Babakale, Ayvacık =

Village in Turkey

Babakale
- Village
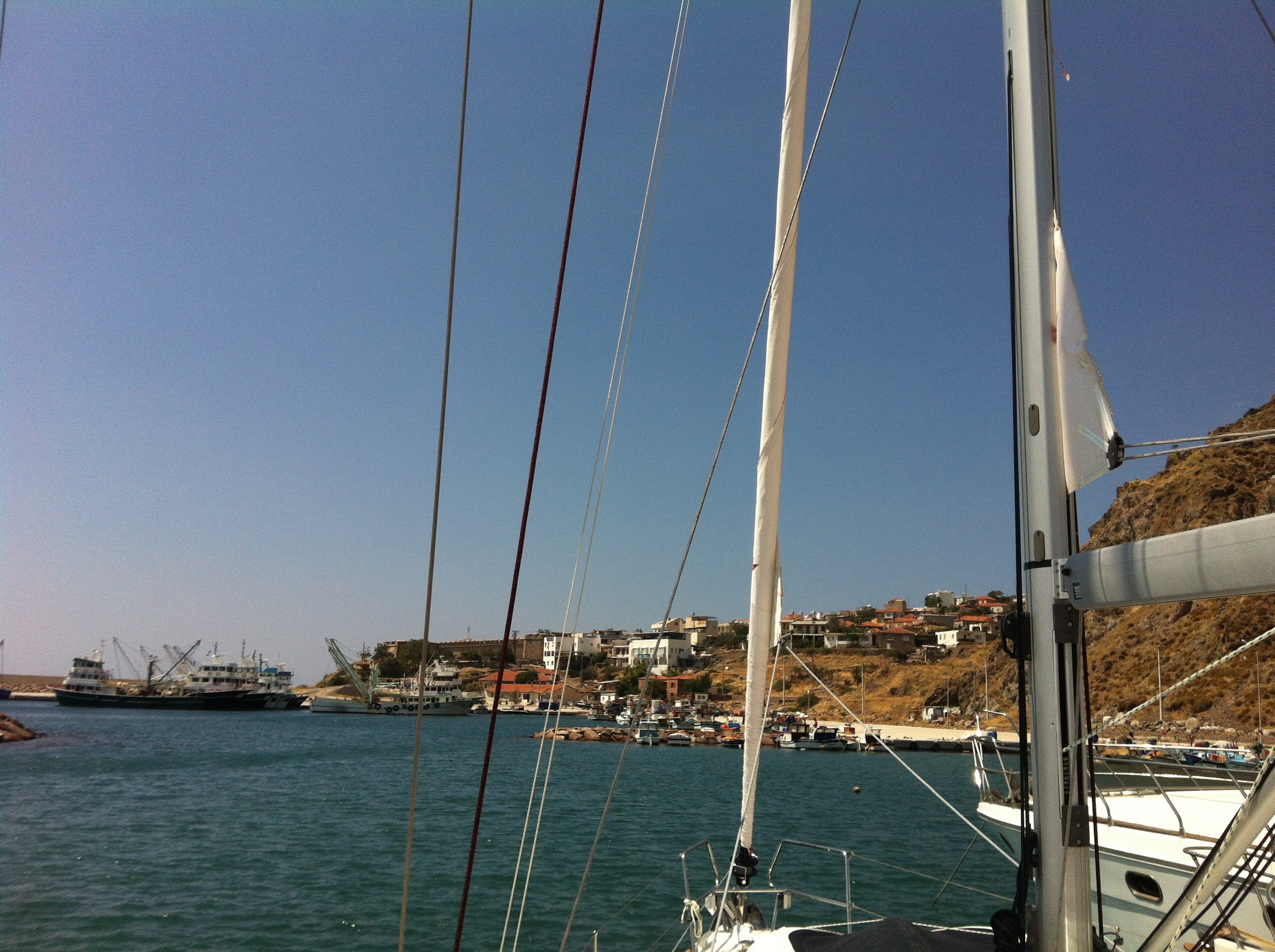
- Babakale

- Location within Turkey Location within Marmara
- Coordinates: 39°28′45″N 26°03′51″E
- Country: Turkey
- Province: Çanakkale
- District: Ayvacık

Government
  - Muhtar: Bekir Vargün
- Population (2021): 494
- Time zone: UTC+3 (TRT)

Babakale is a village in the Ayvacık District of Çanakkale Province in Turkey. Its population is 494 (2021). The place is known for hand-made knife cutlery.

== Geography and history ==
Babakale is located at the southwestern tip of the Biga Peninsula. It is also the westernmost tip of the Asian continent. It is 107 km (66 mi) from the province center Çanakkale and 62 km (39 mi) from Ayvacık.

The settlement was established in the 1300s. It has been known as Babakale since 1912. "Babakale" is a lexeme of Ottoman Turkish بابا (baba, "father") and قلعه (kal'e, "castle"). The location of the village is mentioned for the first time in the Kitab-ı Bahriye ("Book of the Sea") by Piri Reis (c. 1465 – 1553), Ottoman admiral, navigator, geographer and cartographer. According to the historic book, the grave of a saint named Emek Yemez Baba was situated in the location.

Being a seaside resort, the population rises up to 4,000 in summer time. As of 2023, the village head is Bekir Vargün.

== Babakale Castle ==
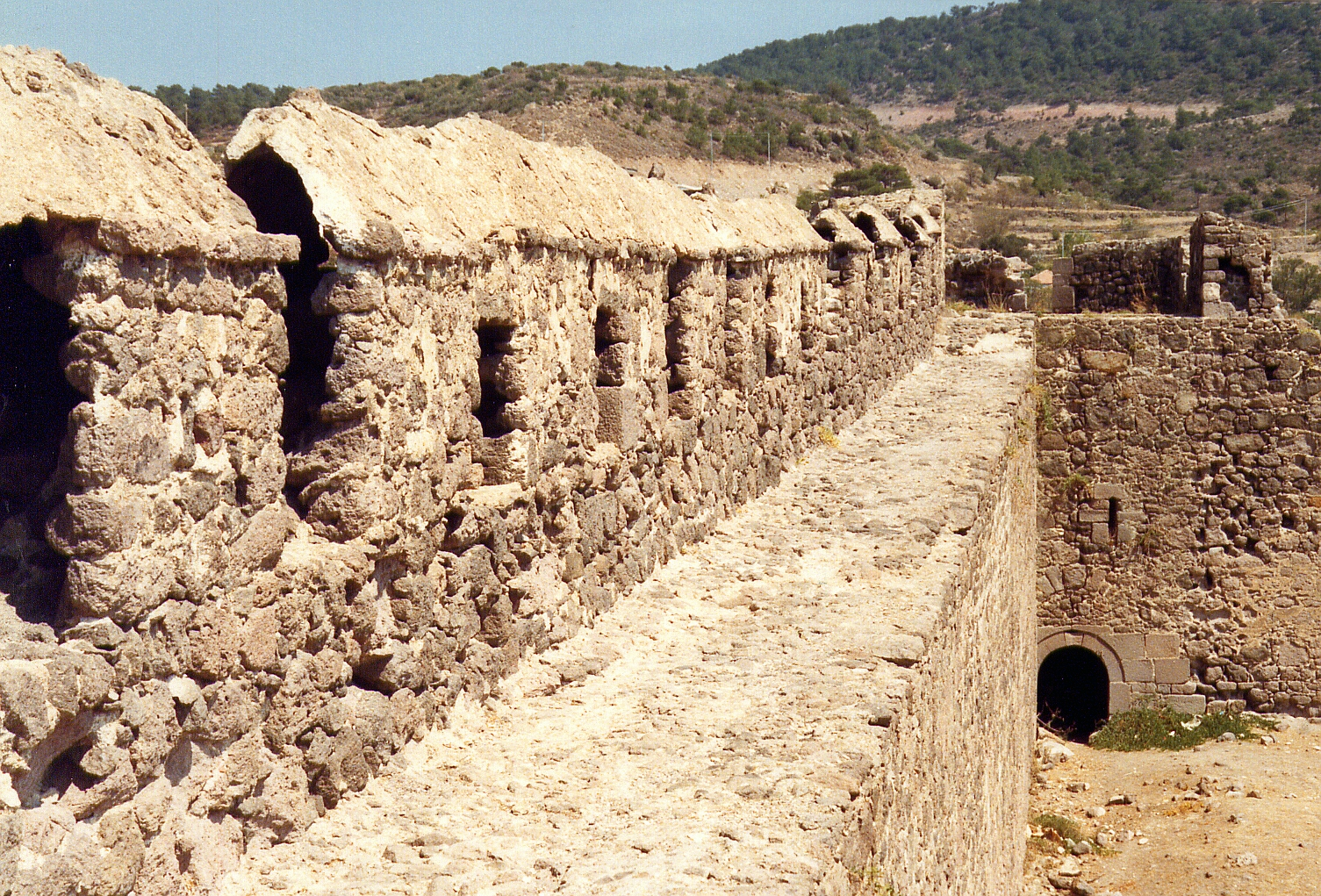
Babakale Castle in 1990

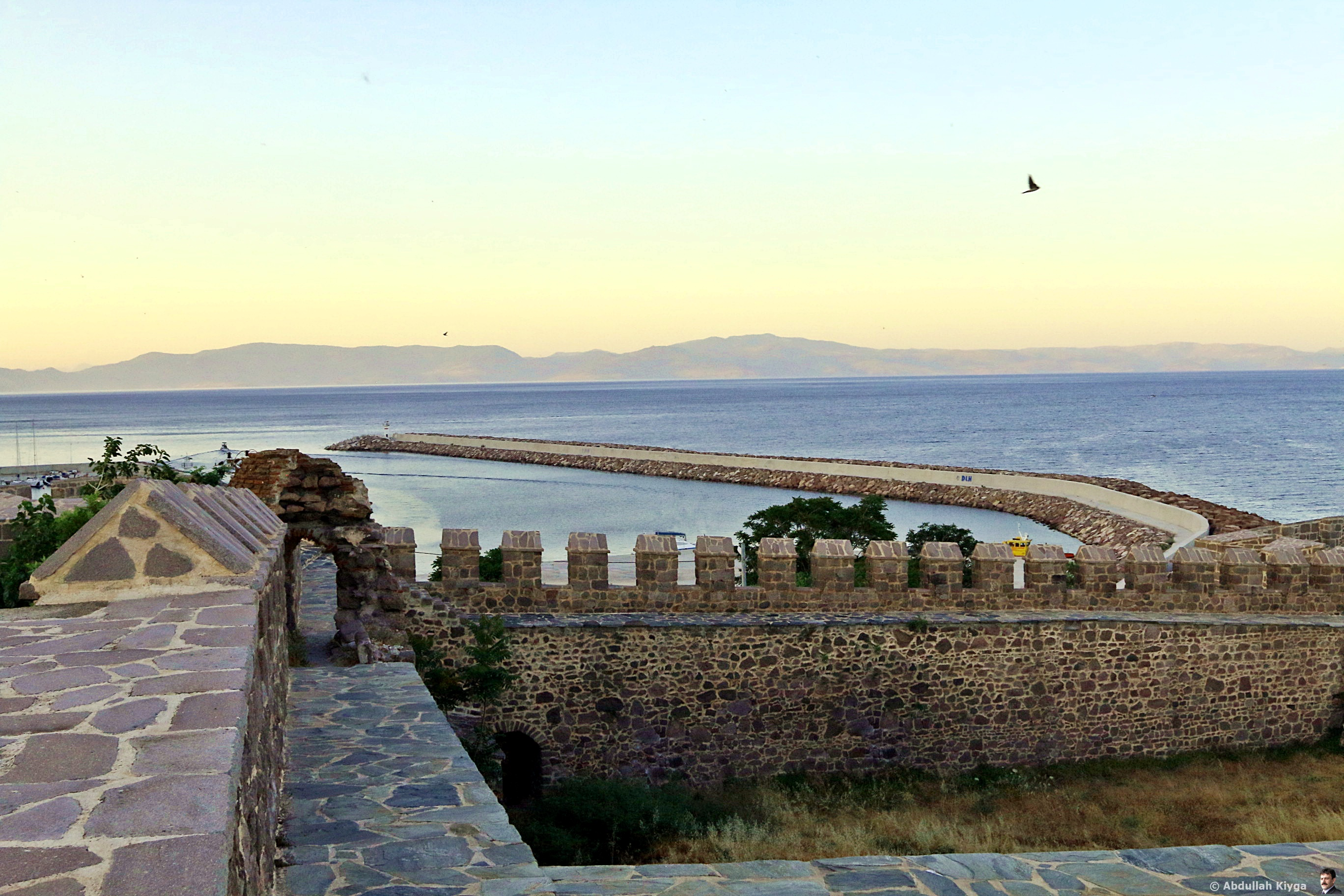
Babakale Castle in 2015 after restoration

The village hosts a castle built during the Ottoman era. There were a mosque, a hammam (bathhouse) and two fountains inside the castle. The Babakale Castle (Ottoman Turkish: Hırzü’l-Bahr) is situated on a hill at Cape Baba near the seashore. According to a marble inscription found above the main castle gate, it was built by Admiral Kaymak Mustafa Pasha between AH 1135–1141 (1722–1729 CE) to protect the settlement from French pirates. The castle is oriented in northwest–southeast direction. It has a rectangular plan with watchtowers on four corners. Entrance to the castle is through the main gate on the middle of the northeast front. In addition, there is a small gate next to the southeastern watchtower.

== Gallery, Babakale Castle ==
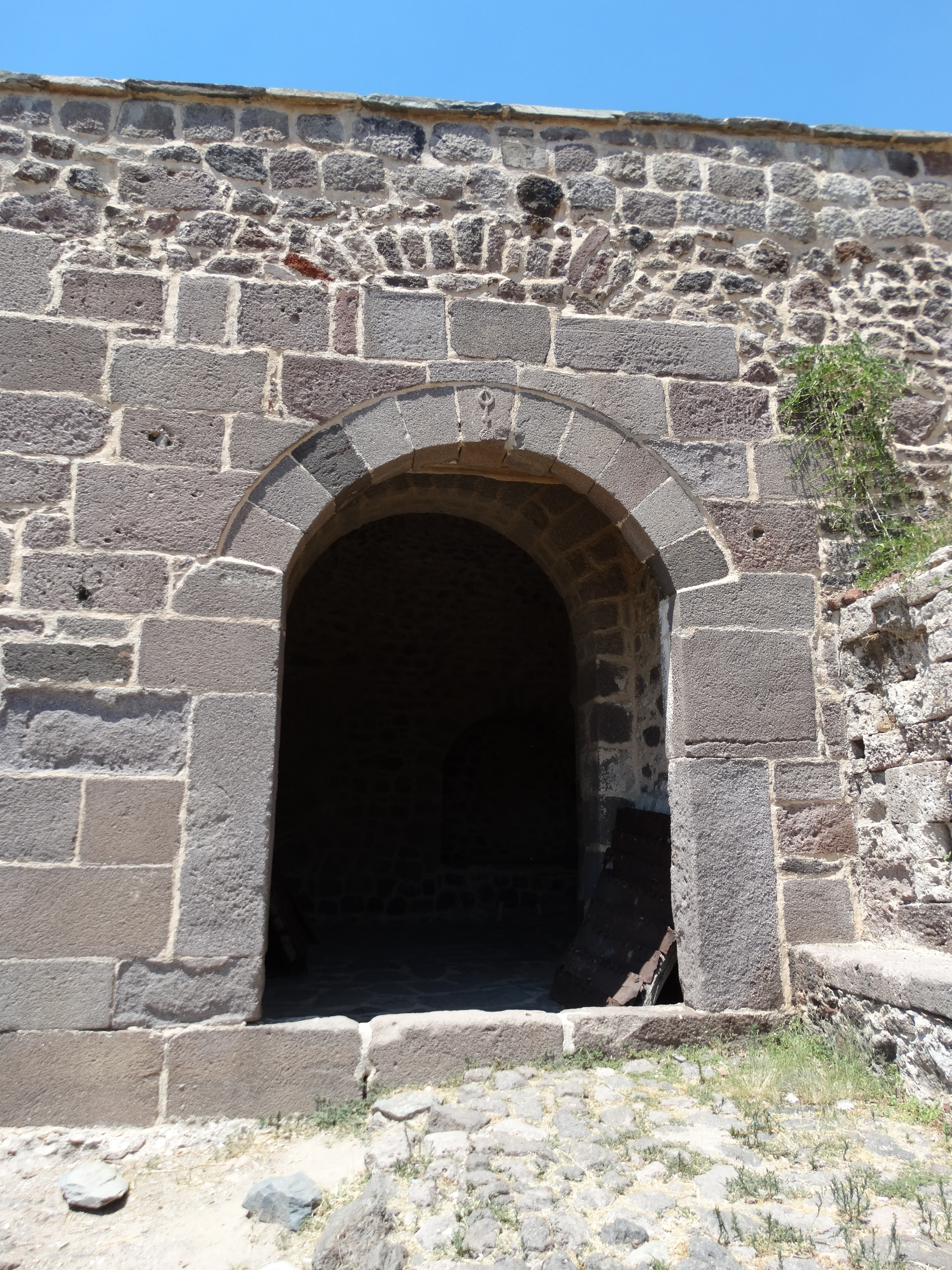

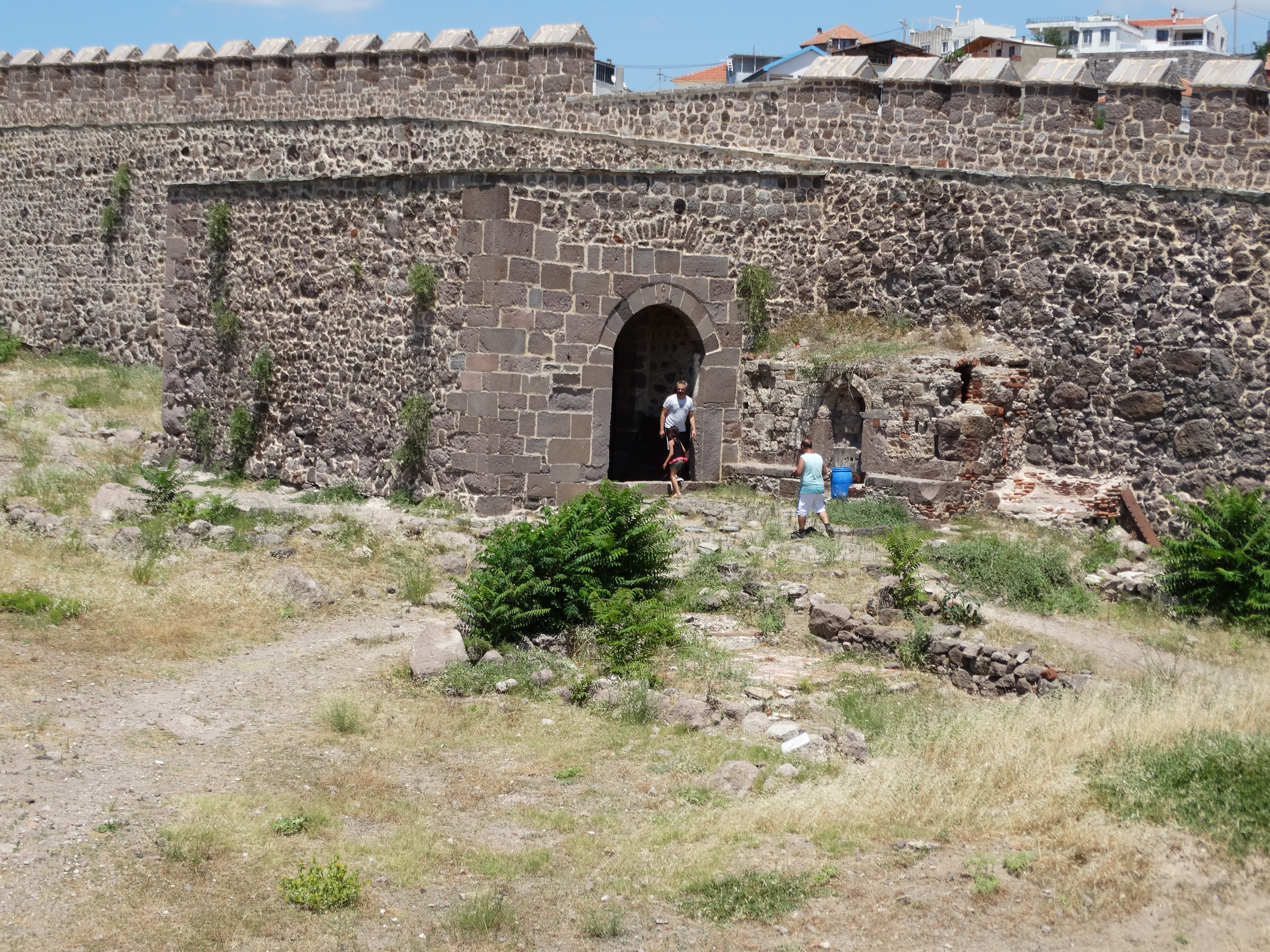

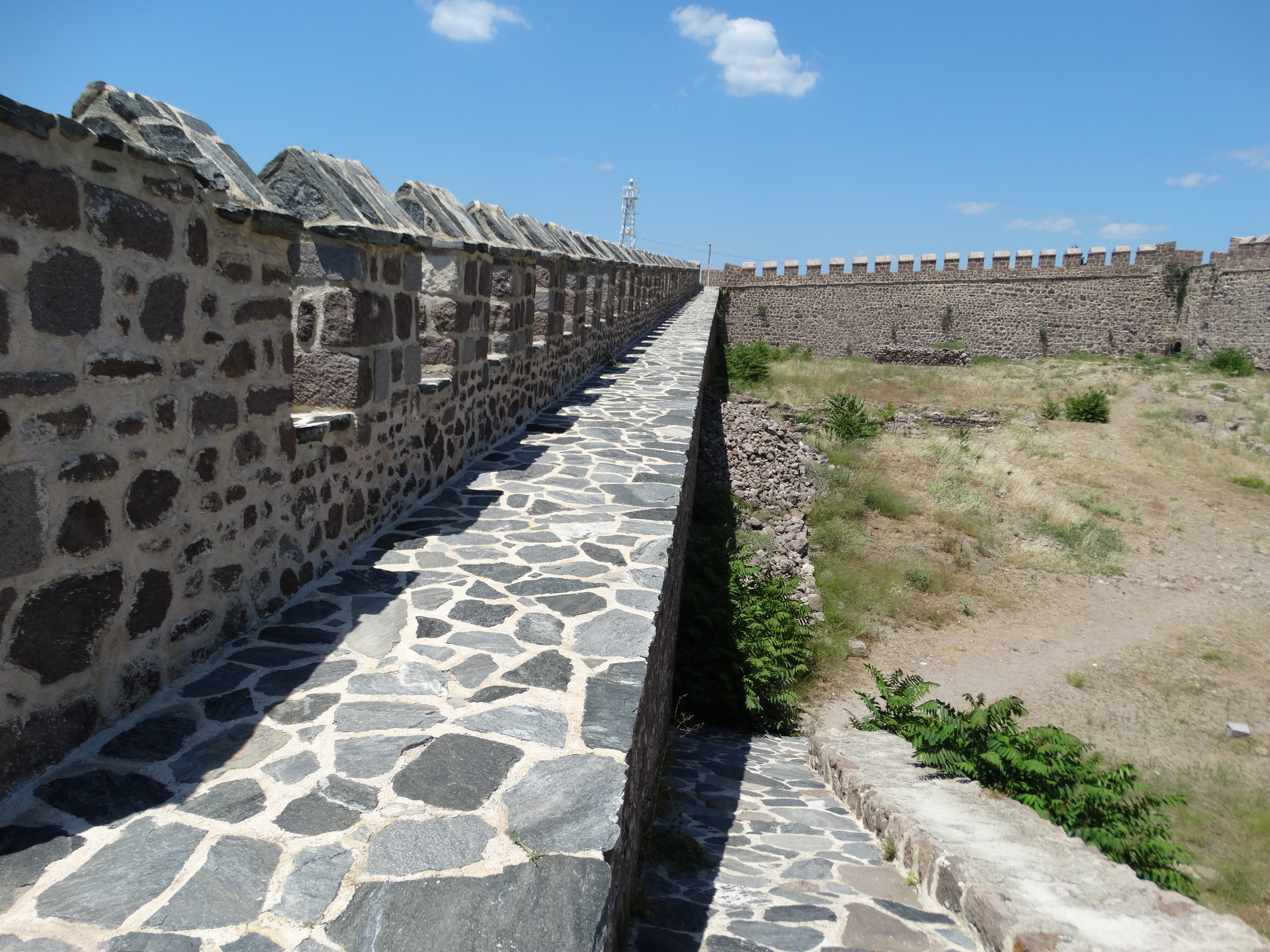

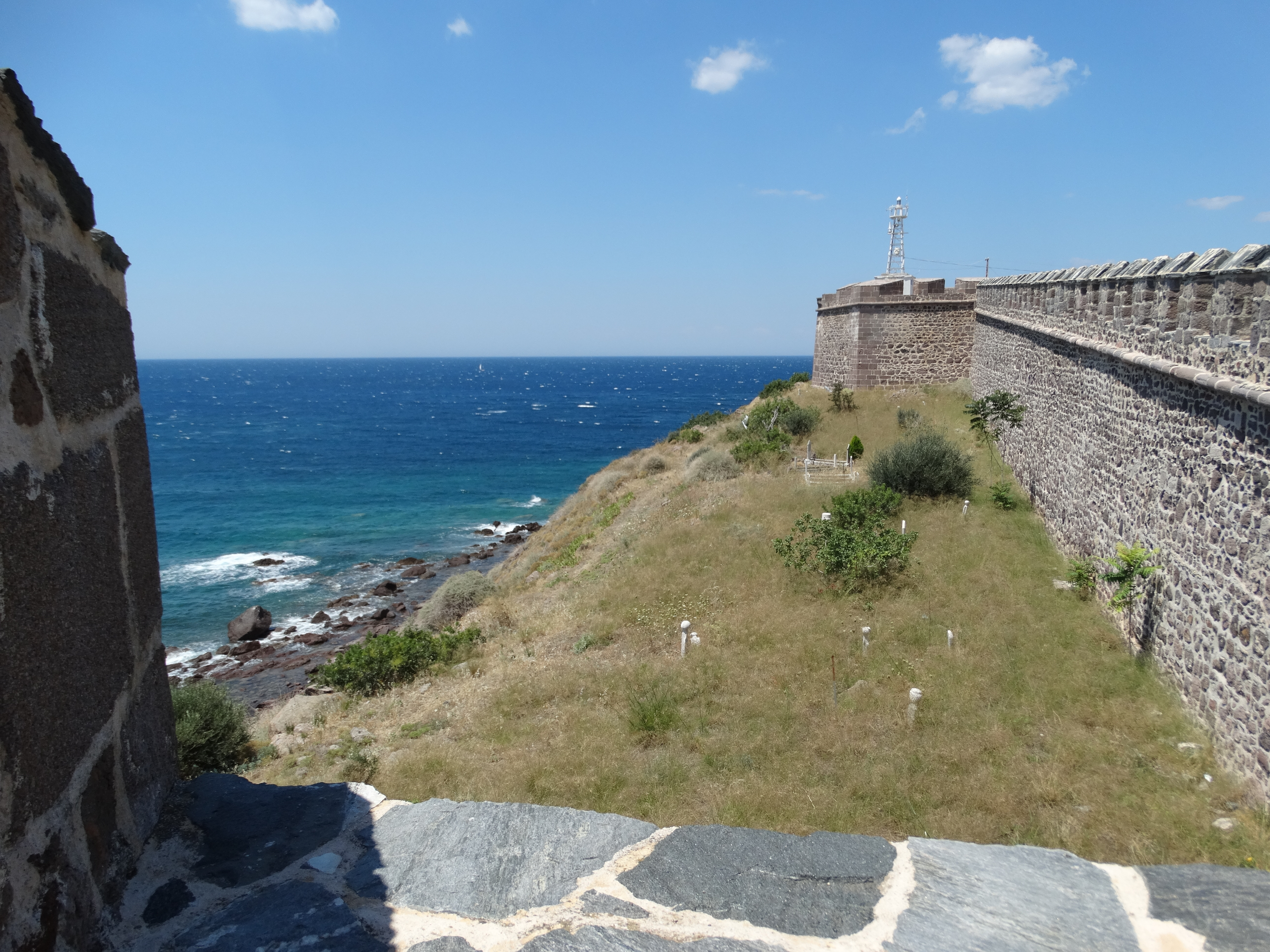

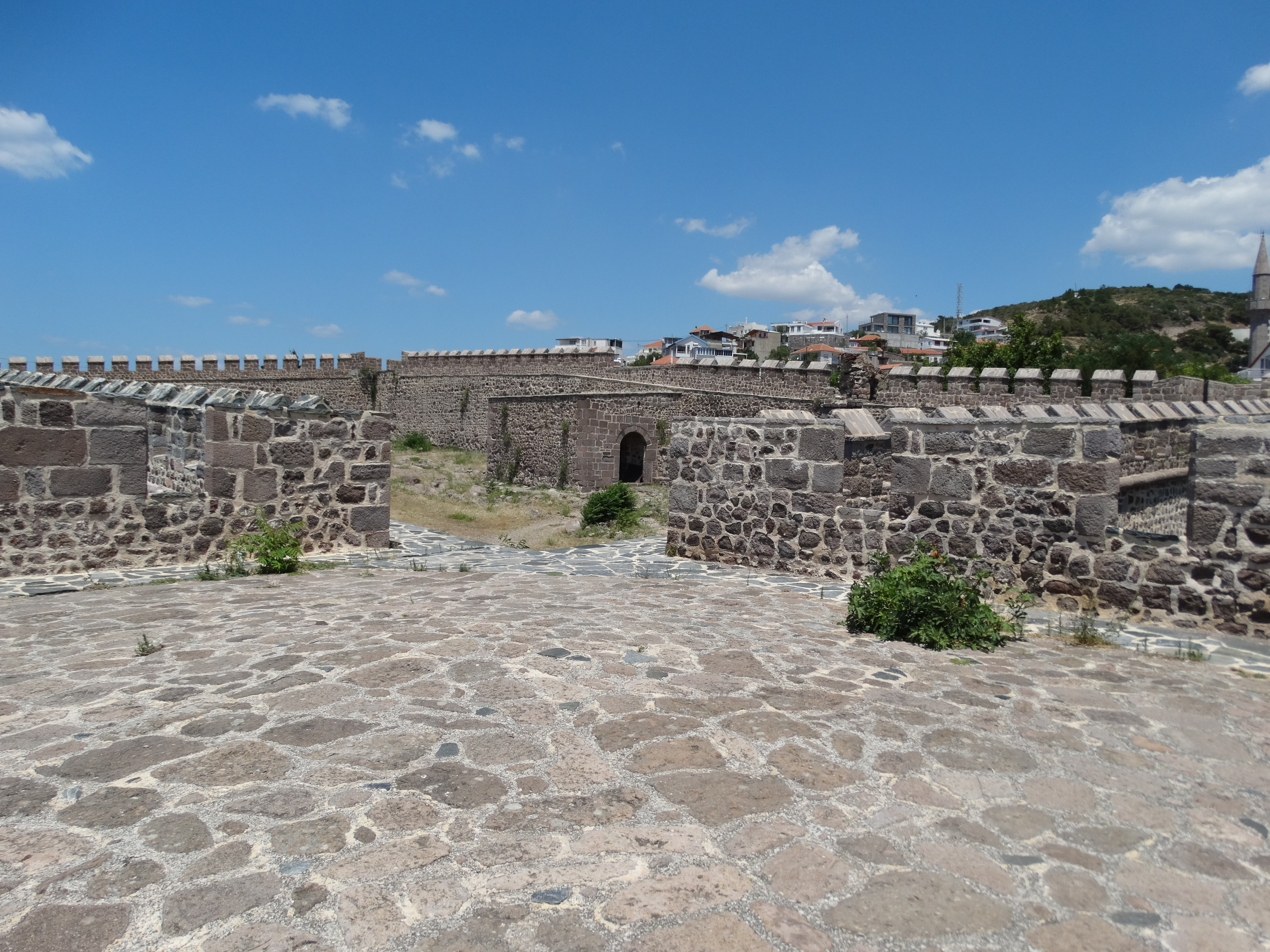

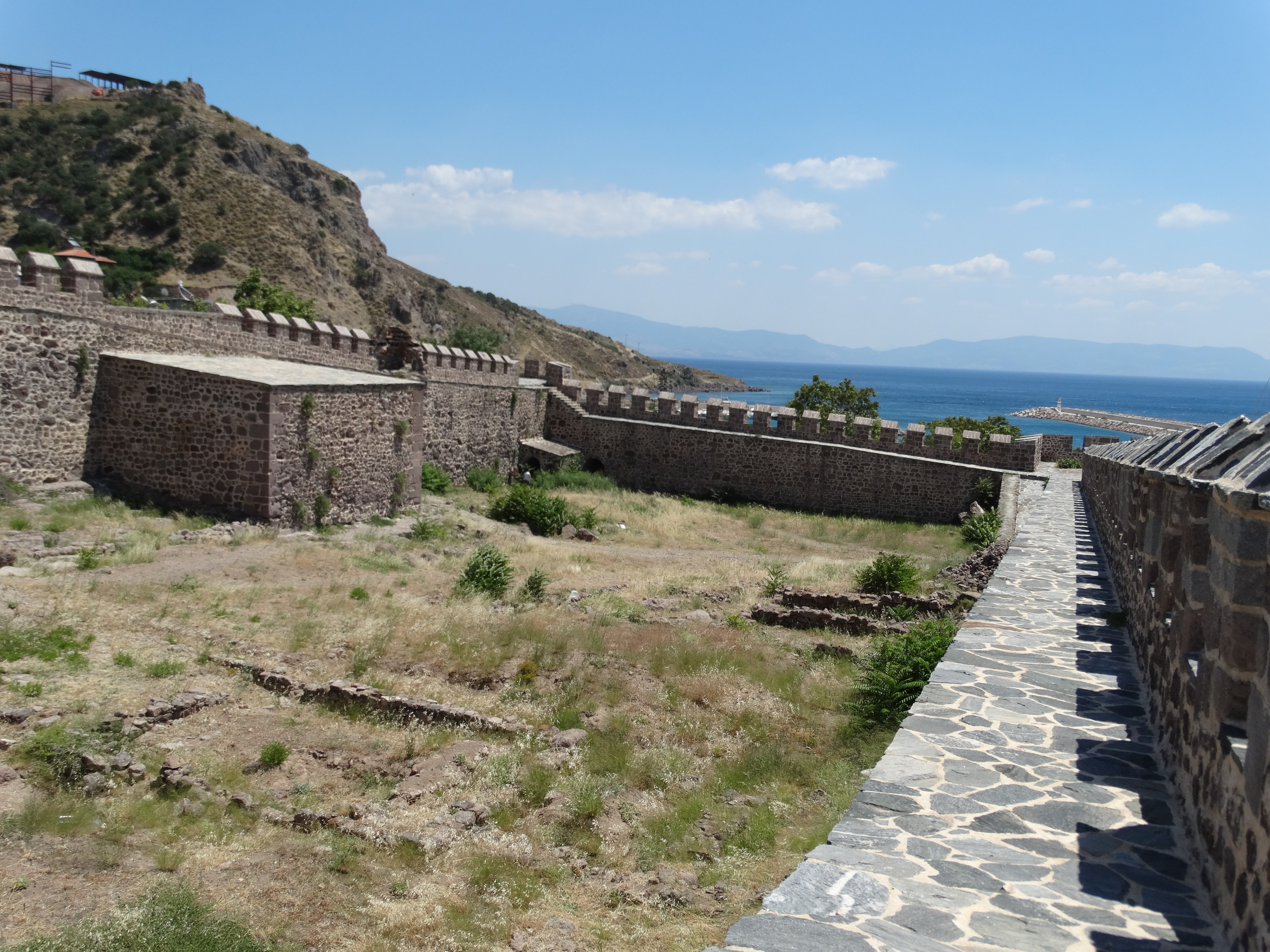

== Cutlery manufacturing ==
Babakale is known for handcrafting knife cutlery. According to the local cutlers, the handicraft goes back to the 1720s when the castle was built; after the completion of the castle, cutting and piercing weapons such as swords, daggers and knives, which were needed by the castle-guards, were handcrafted in the beginning by master cutlers, who had immigrated from modern-day Kazakhstan. At one time the cutlery, which was produced in around 18 workshops, was exported to many places in a region between Syria and Egypt from the local port via sea trade. Manufactured of forged chrome steel by traditional methods, the knives of Babakale are stored in a scabbard and are ornamented.

The knives are categorized upon the structure of the hilt, such as the Bowie knife, common knife and handle knife, as well as upon usage: the grapefruit knife is 14–19 cm (5.5–7.5 in) long, the belt-knife for shepherds is 20.5–22 cm (8.1–8.7 in) long, the hunting knife is 25 cm (9.8 in) long, and the butcher knife is 30–35 cm (12–14 in) long. "Delivery of special customer orders may take up to five months" as told by a cutler.
