= Cape Baba =

Westernmost point of the Turkish mainland

Coordinates: 39°28′47″N 26°03′48″E

Cape Baba (Turkish: Baba Burnu) or Cape Lecton (Ancient Greek: Λεκτόν) is the westernmost point of the Turkish mainland, making it the westernmost point of Asia. It is located at the village of Babakale ("Father Castle"), Ayvacık, Çanakkale, in the historical area of the Troad. There was a lighthouse at Cape Baba that was called Lekton (Latinized as Lectum) in classical times, anglicised as Cape Lecture.

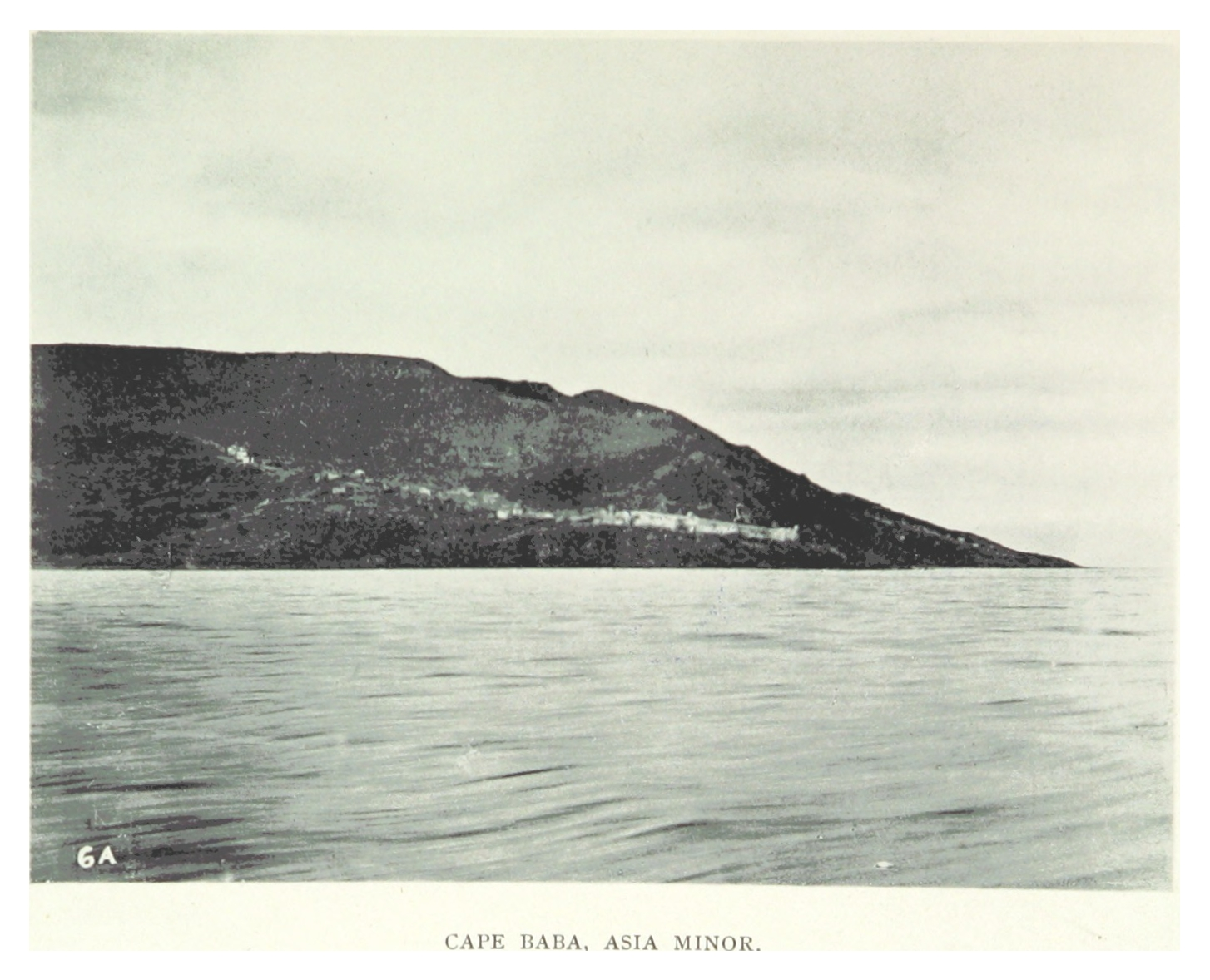
Cape Baba in 1895

Cape Lecton is mentioned in Homer's Iliad, and by many ancient writers and geographers, including Herodotus, Thucydides, Aristotle, Livy, Plutarch, Strabo, Pliny the Elder, Athenaeus and Ptolemaeus.

The Acts of the Apostles records a journey around the Cape from Troas to Assos undertaken by Luke the Evangelist and his companions, while Paul the Apostle took the journey over land (Acts 20:13). The Jamieson-Fausset-Brown Bible Commentary explains:

In sailing southward from Troas to Assos, one has to round Cape Lecture, and keeping due east to run along the northern shore of the Gulf of Adramyttium, on which it lies. This is a sail of nearly forty miles; whereas by land, cutting right across, in a southeasterly direction, from sea to sea, by that excellent Roman road which then existed, the distance was scarcely more than half. The one way Paul wished his companions to take, while he himself, longing perhaps to enjoy a period of solitude, took the other, joining the ship, by appointment, at Assos.

== See also ==
- Babakale, Ayvacık
- Babakale Castle
