= Klášter Hradiště nad Jizerou =

- Municipality
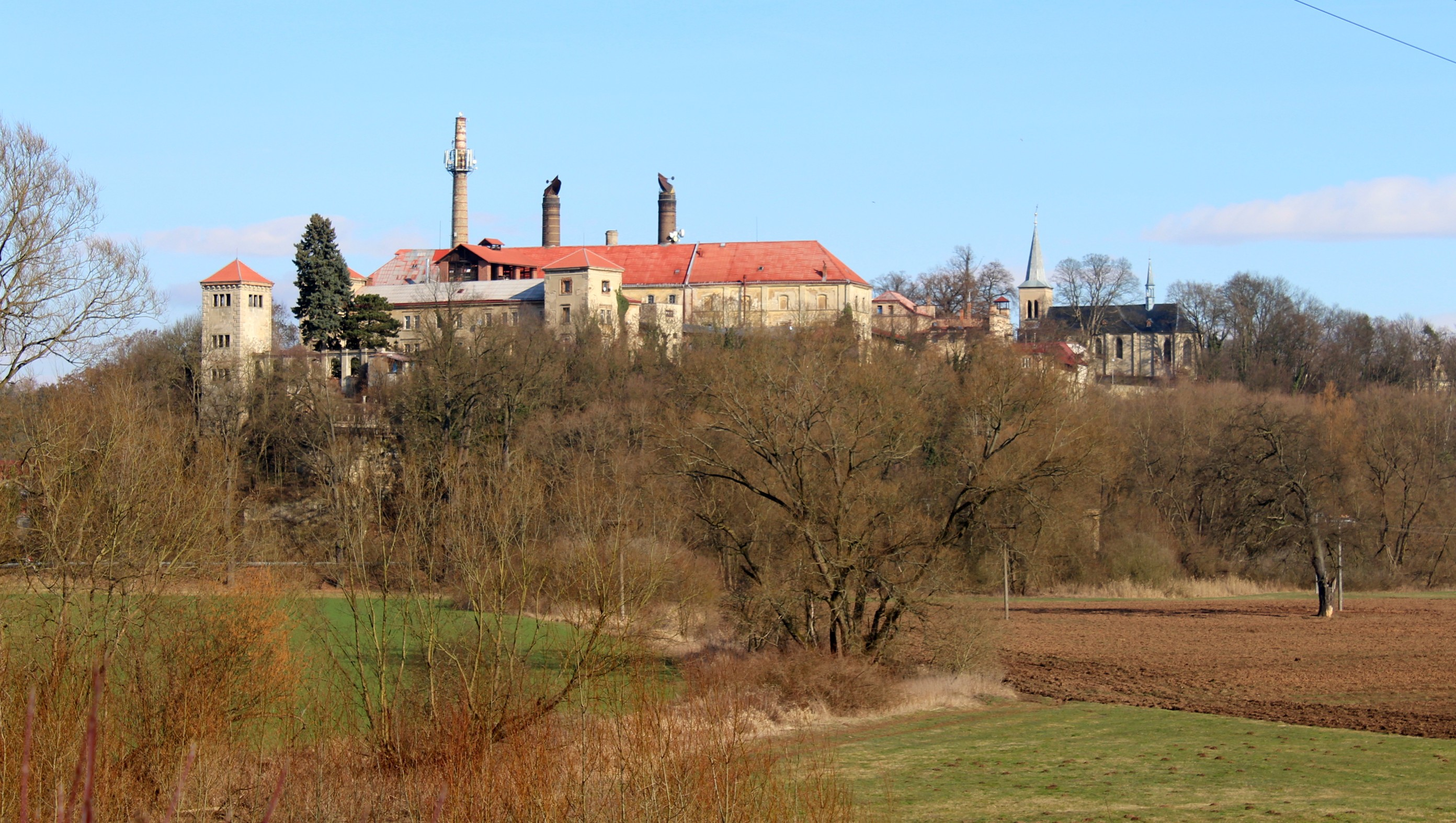
- Brewery and Church of the Nativity of the Virgin Mary

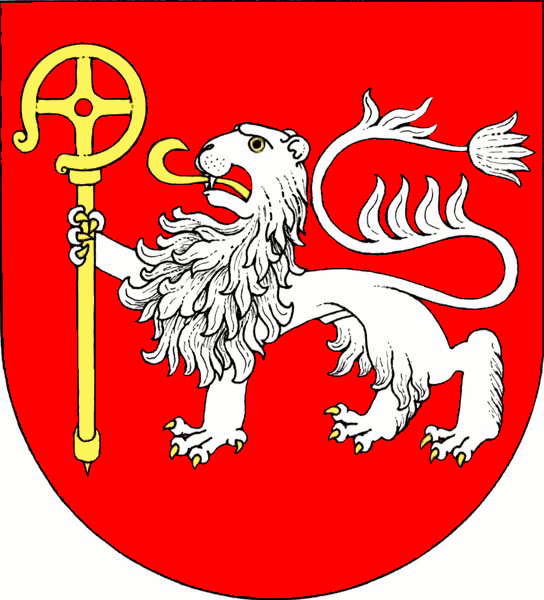
- Flag Coat of arms

- Location in the Czech Republic
- Coordinates: 50°31′24″N 14°56′41″E
- Country: Czech Republic
- Region: Central Bohemian
- District: Mladá Boleslav
- Founded: 1145

Area
  - Total: 4.62 km^{2} (1.78 sq mi)
- Elevation: 228 m (748 ft)

Population (2026-01-01)
  - Total: 1,026
  - Density: 222/km^{2} (575/sq mi)
- Time zone: UTC+1 (CET)
  - Summer (DST): UTC+2 (CEST)
- Postal code: 294 15
- Website: www.klasterhradistenj.cz

Klášter Hradiště nad Jizerou (German: Kloster an der Iser) is a municipality and village in Mladá Boleslav District in the Central Bohemian Region of the Czech Republic. It has about 1,000 inhabitants.

== Etymology ==
The name Klášter Hradiště literally means 'monastery of the gord' in Czech. The suffix nad Jizerou means 'upon the Jizera'.

== Geography ==
Klášter Hradiště nad Jizerou is located about 11 kilometres (7 mi) north of Mladá Boleslav and 56 km (35 mi) northeast of Prague. It lies mostly in the Jizera Table, but it also extends into the Jičín Uplands in the south. The highest point is at 301 m (988 ft) above sea level. The municipality is situated on the rights bank of the Jizera River, which forms the eastern municipal border. The Zábrdka stream flows through the village and joins the Jizera south of the village.

== History ==
The Cistercian monastery Klášter Hradiště was founded in 1144–1145 on the site of a gord, which stood here in the 6th–10th centuries.

== Demographics ==
Historical population

Year	Pop.	±%
1869	1,018	—
1880	1,041	+2.3%
1890	1,076	+3.4%
1900	1,073	−0.3%
1910	1,158	+7.9%

Year	Pop.	±%
1921	1,035	−10.6%
1930	1,124	+8.6%
1950	800	−28.8%
1961	930	+16.3%
1970	826	−11.2%

Year	Pop.	±%
1980	716	−13.3%
1991	641	−10.5%
2001	661	+3.1%
2011	866	+31.0%
2021	998	+15.2%

Source: Censuses

== Economy ==
Klášter Hradiště nad Jizerou is known for the Klášter Brewery. The history of brewing beer in the village dates back to 1570. At the end of 2020, the production was suspended and it is unsure if it will be renewed.

== Transport ==
There are no railways or major roads passing through the municipality.

== Sights ==
The Gothic complex of the Cistercian monastery was built in the 12th century, but it was burned during the Hussite Wars in 1420. The ruins were rebuilt in the 16th century into a Renaissance castle. In the 19th century, the castle was converted into a brewery. It remains a cultural monument.

The Church of the Nativity of the Virgin Mary was built in the Renaissance style in 1560. In the 19th century, neo-Gothic tower was added.

== Notable people ==
- Jaroslav Pešán (1912–1972), soldier and paratrooper
