= Nasavrky =

- Town
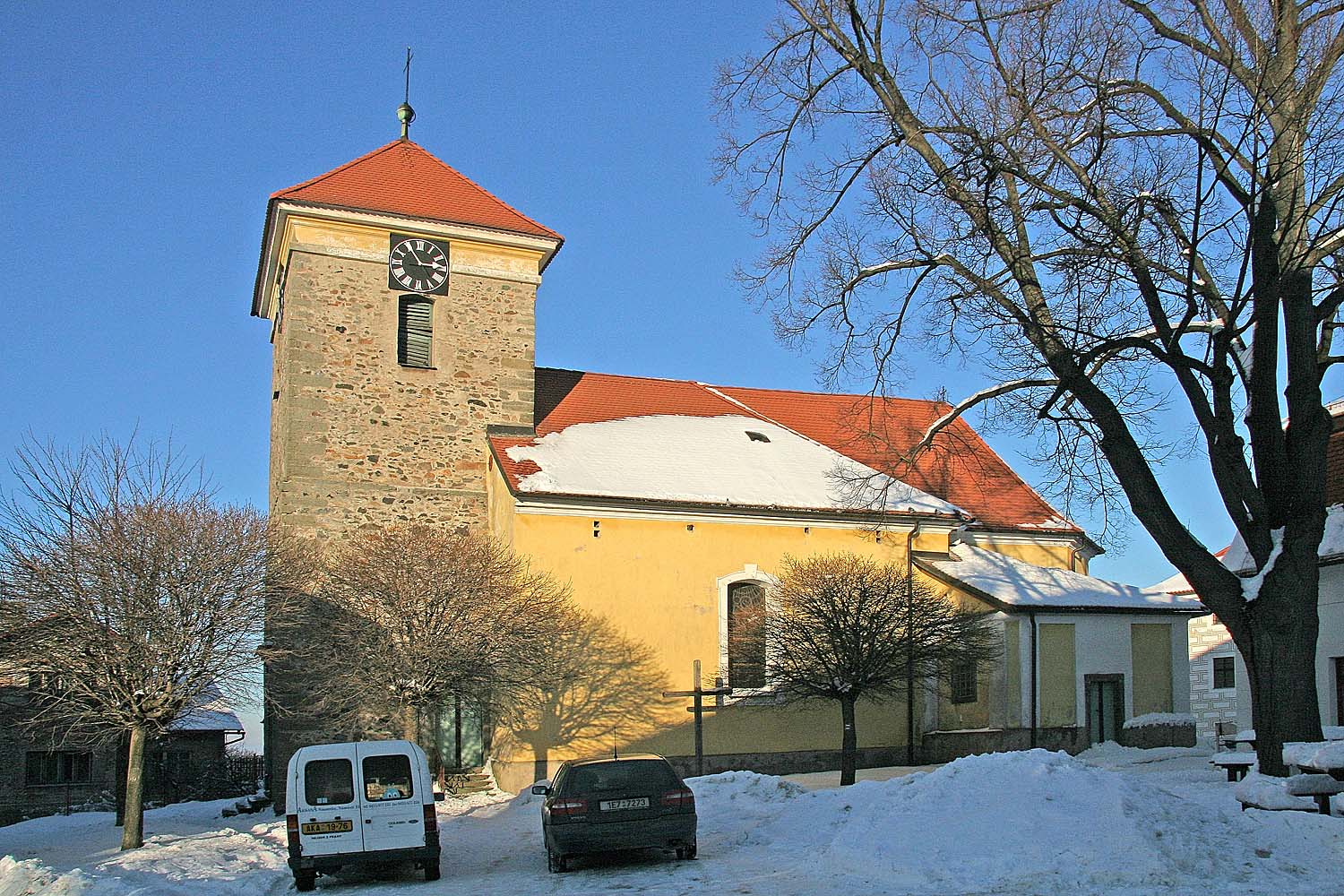
- Church of Saint Giles

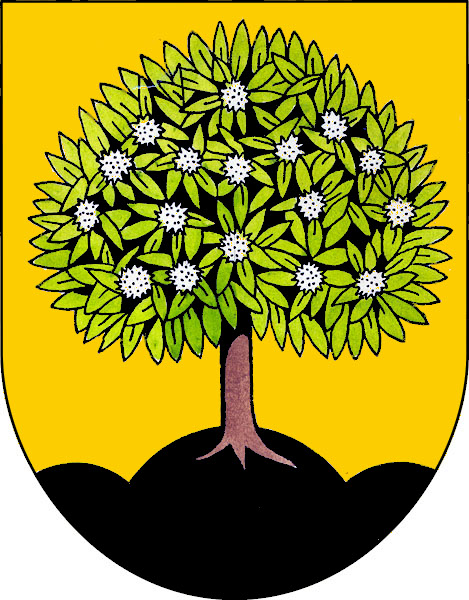
- Flag Coat of arms

- Location in the Czech Republic
- Coordinates: 49°50′40″N 15°48′17″E
- Country: Czech Republic
- Region: Pardubice
- District: Chrudim
- First mentioned: 1318

Government
  - Mayor: Milan Chvojka

Area
  - Total: 12.57 km^{2} (4.85 sq mi)
- Elevation: 475 m (1,558 ft)

Population (2026-01-01)
  - Total: 1,690
  - Density: 134/km^{2} (348/sq mi)
- Time zone: UTC+1 (CET)
  - Summer (DST): UTC+2 (CEST)
- Postal code: 538 25
- Website: www.nasavrky.cz

Nasavrky (Czech pronunciation: [ˈnasavr̩kɪ]; German: Nassaberg) is a town in Chrudim District in the Pardubice Region of the Czech Republic. It has about 1,700 inhabitants.

== Administrative division ==
Nasavrky consists of eight municipal parts (in brackets population according to the 2021 census):

- Nasavrky (1,202)
- Březovec (11)
- Drahotice (34)
- Libáň (62)
- Nová Ves (55)
- Obořice (39)
- Ochoz (150)
- Podlíšťany (73)

== Etymology ==
The name Nasavrky has its origin in the Czech words vrkat na sebe ('coo at each other'). Nasavrk was a figurative term for a person in love. So Nasavrky was a village of such people.

== Geography ==
Nasavrky is located about 11 kilometres (7 mi) south of Chrudim and 20 km (12 mi) south of Pardubice. It lies in the Iron Mountains and partly within the Železné hory Protected Landscape Area. The highest point is at 564 m (1,850 ft) above sea level. The area is rich in small fishponds.

== History ==
The first written mention of Nasavrky is from 1318. Bishop Jan Očko of Vlašim acquired the village in 1355. During his rule, in 1360, Nasavrky was promoted to a town. From 1746 to 1942, Nasavrky was owned by a branch of the Auersperg family.

== Demographics ==
Historical population

Year	Pop.	±%
1869	1,754	—
1880	1,794	+2.3%
1890	1,798	+0.2%
1900	1,812	+0.8%
1910	1,850	+2.1%

Year	Pop.	±%
1921	1,825	−1.4%
1930	1,824	−0.1%
1950	1,616	−11.4%
1961	1,684	+4.2%
1970	1,597	−5.2%

Year	Pop.	±%
1980	1,445	−9.5%
1991	1,405	−2.8%
2001	1,449	+3.1%
2011	1,606	+10.8%
2021	1,626	+1.2%

Source: Censuses

== Transport ==
The I/37 road, which connects Hradec Králové and Pardubice with the D1 motorway, runs through the town.

== Sights ==
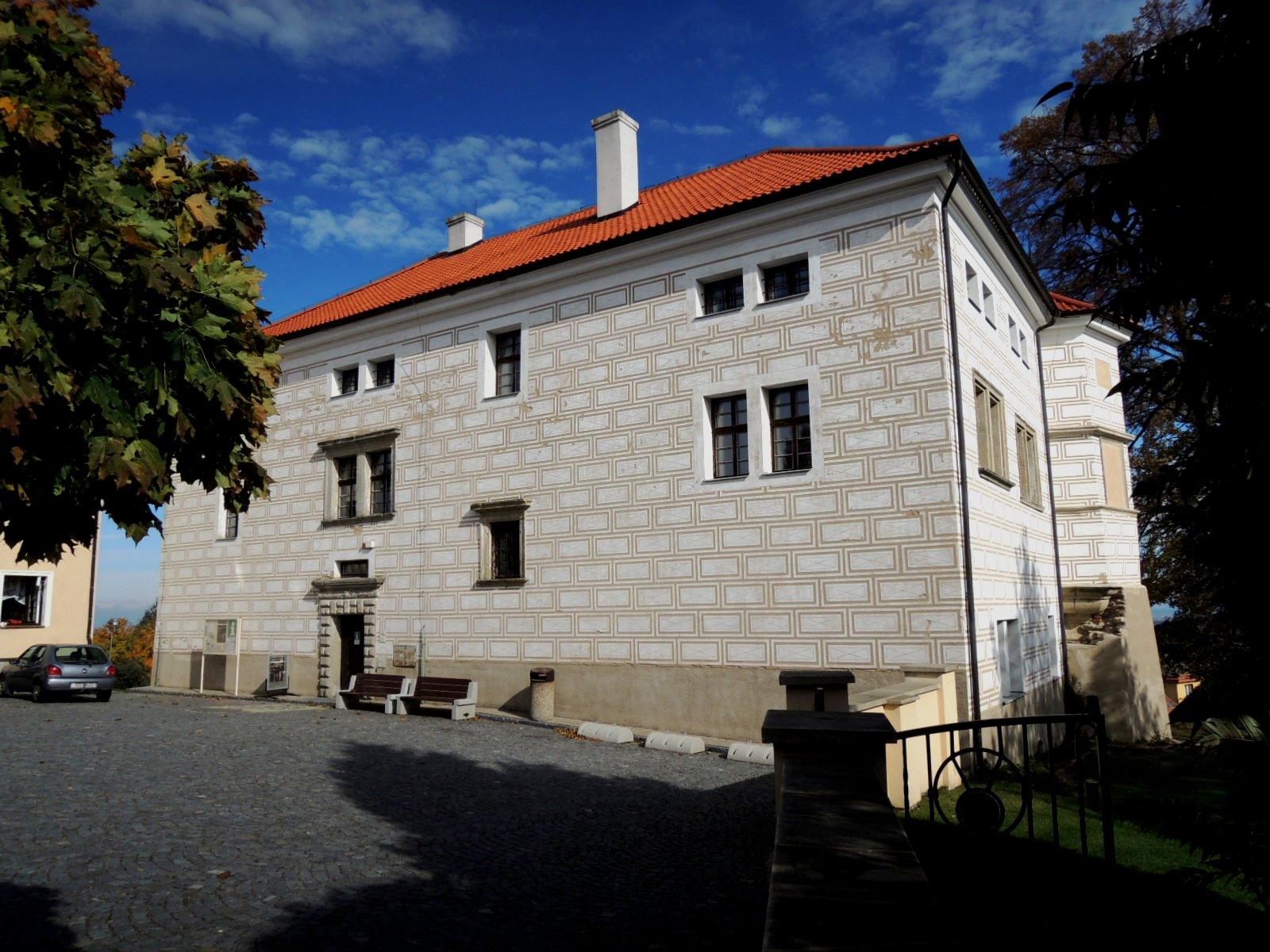
Nasavrky Castle

The Church of Saint Giles was built in the Gothic style in the 14th century. After a fire in 1740, Baroque modifications were made.

The Nasavrky Castle is a late Renaissance building from around 1600. It was built on the site of an old Gothic fortress. It has a valuable entrance hall with Renaissance portals. Originally it served as a summer residence of the Auersperg family, later there were apartments and offices. Today it serves cultural and social purposes and there is an exposition about the life of the Celts.

Země keltů ('land of Celts') is an open-air museum presenting life in a Celtic settlement, which was once in the territory of the Iron Mountains.
