= 1944 Gulf of Edremit–Ayvacik earthquake =

Earthquake in Turkey

- Location within Turkey
- UTC time: 1944-10-06 02:34:47
- ISC event: 899568
- USGS-ANSS: ComCat
- Local date
- Local time
- Duration: 20–25 seconds
- Magnitude: 6.8 M_{s} 6.7 M_{w}
- Depth: 15 km (9 mi)
- Epicenter: 39.5°N 26.6°E
- Areas affected: Turkey
- Max. intensity: MSK-64 IX (Destructive)
- Tsunami: Yes
- Aftershocks: M_{s} 4.9 & 5.2
- Casualties: 73 dead, 275 injured

The 1944 Gulf of Edremit–Ayvacik earthquake occurred on October 6 at 05:34:48 local time in Balıkesir Province, Turkey. It measured 6.7 on the moment magnitude scale (M_{w}) and occurred at a depth of 15 km (9 mi). The normal-faulting event had a maximum MSK-64 intensity of IX. A total of 73 people died and 275 others were injured.

== Tectonic setting ==
The region around Balıkesir Province is tectonically influenced by the large strike-slip North Anatolian Fault, and normal faults in the Aegean Sea extensional zone. A large strand of the North Anatolian Fault branches southwest and traces near the north coast of the Gulf of Edremit. This segment of the fault begins northeast of the gulf, at Lake Manyas. The segment enters the Aegean Sea near the town of Babakale, Ayvacık. Off the north coast of the gulf is a notable east northeast–west southwest trending normal fault that dips to the south.

== Earthquake ==
The earthquake had an epicenter in the Gulf of Edremit. It was associated with a surface rupture stretching from Doyuran to Arıklı. At Doyran, eyewitnesses reported surface cracks on a road leading to the gulf. The Gulf of Edremit represents a shallow graben in the Aegean Sea. It is 110 m (360 ft) at its deepest and trends east northeast–west southwest. It is bounded by two normal faults at the north and south ends of the gulf. The earthquake was associated with a rupture on the Edremit Fault; an east northeast–west southwest trending, high-angle normal fault at the northern edge of the gulf. The total length of the surface rupture was 38 km (24 mi), with the eastern half located offshore. Up to 1.2 m (3 ft 11 in) of slip occurred during the rupture. The greatest surface displacement was measured near a village at 1 m (3 ft 3 in). The focal mechanism solution suggest normal faulting with a small strike-slip component.

== Impact ==
The earthquake lasted 20–25 seconds, destroying and affecting at least 5,500 homes. More than 2,200 homes, which were mainly constructed out of masonry, were demolished. A further 3,100 homes were heavily damaged. In the villages of Hayrettinpasa and Vehbibey, 90 percent of all buildings collapsed. Many surface fissures appeared, and water erupted from the ground. It was strongly felt on two ships docked at a harbour in Ayvalık, a city across the bay on the southern shores. Many casualties, as well as property damage, were reported in Alibey and Ayvalık. There, 1,114 homes were demolished. Many old Greek-style houses built of stones were destroyed. Over 300 homes suffered damage and at least 92 were obliterated in Alibey.

A maximum MSK-64 intensity of IX (Destructive) was assigned to this event. The area with the worst damage was an elongated wedge-shaped area stretching 10 km (6.2 mi) from Tamış to the coast. A small promontory formed near Babakale. An aftershock caused the majority of damage in the village. Severe damage occurred in Kozluca and has been attributed to the local geology consisting of unconsolidated erosion sediments. A surface rupture was observed at Küçukkuyu. It was reportedly 10–30 cm (3.9–11.8 in) wide and extended across the village. The coastal region and river valley subsided by 10 cm (3.9 in). Another surface rupture was documented at Adatepe, Ayvacık.

A tsunami inundated Ayvalik by 200 m (660 ft). The tsunami caused additional damage in the affected villages. A report by Gazette Tanin stated the tsunami washed away buildings along the coast. The tsunami broke wooden boat piers and deposited marine debris onto the roads of Hayrettinpasa and Vehbibey.

== See also ==
- List of earthquakes in 1944
- List of earthquakes in Turkey
- Altınok, Y.; Alpar, B.; Yaltırak, C.; Pınar, A.; Özer, N. (2012). "The earthquakes and related tsunamis of October 6,1944 and March 7, 1867; NE Aegean Sea". Natural Hazards. 60 (1): 3–25. Bibcode:2012NatHa..60....3A. doi:10.1007/s11069-011-9949-7. S2CID 128893506.
- Sözbilir, Hasan; Sümer, Ökmen; Özkaymak, Çağlar; Uzel, Bora; Güler, Tayfun; Eski, Semih (2016). "Kinematic analysis and palaeoseismology of the Edremit Fault Zone: evidence for past earthquakes in the southern branch of the North Anatolian Fault Zone, Biga Peninsula, NW Turkey". Geodinamica Acta. 28 (4): 273–294. Bibcode:2016GeoAc..28..273S. doi:10.1080/09853111.2016.1175294. ISSN 1778-3593. S2CID 130455249.
