= Bektash (disambiguation) =

Bektaş
- Gender: Male

Origin
- Word/name: Turkic
- Meaning: 'Equal', 'peer' from Old Anatolian Turkish beŋdeş; alternatively, 'sturdy stone' from bek/pek and taş

Bektaş or Bektash is a Turkic name.

== Given names ==
- Bektaş Demirel (born 1976), Turkish judoka
- Bektash of Kakheti (died 1615), Safavid military leader
- Bektash Khan Mirimanidze (died 1639), Safavid governor
- Haji Bektash Veli, founder of the Bektashi order

== Surname ==
- Barış Bektaş (born 1976), Turkish politician
- Cansu Bektaş (born 2003), Turkish female weightlifter
- Emina Bektas (born 1993), American tennis player
- Habib Bektaş (born 1951), Turkish-German writer
- Yasemen Bektaş (born 2003), Turkish female badminton player

== Places ==
- Bektaş, Ayvacık, a village in western Turkey
- Bektaş, Giresun, a highland (yayla) in Giresun Province, Turkey
- Bektaş, Vezirköprü, a village in northern Turkey

== Other uses ==
- Bektashi Order, an Islamic Sufi mystic order originating in the 13th-century
