= Adatepe, Ayvacık =

Village in Turkey

Adatepe
- Village
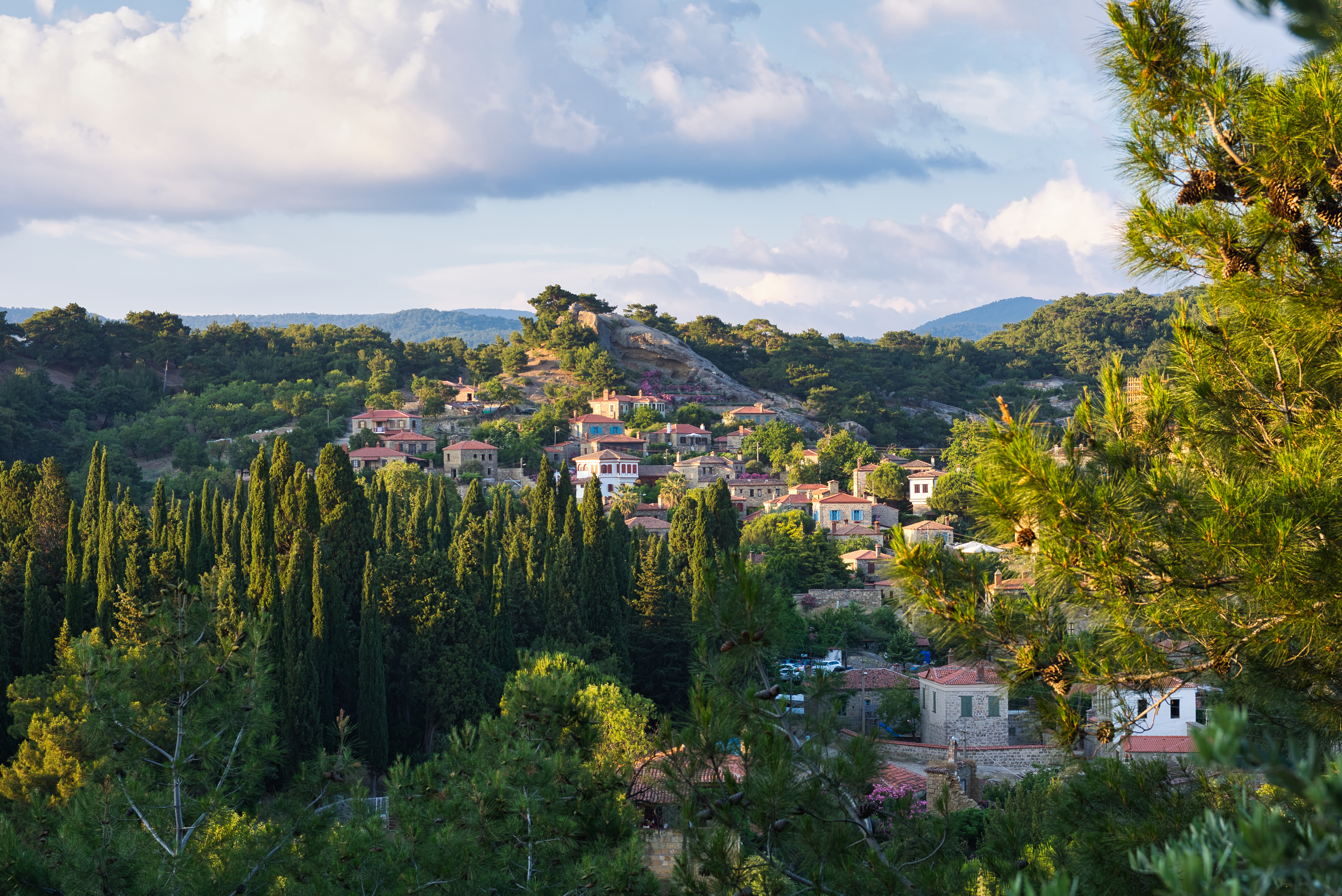
- View of Adatepe

- Location within Turkey Location within Marmara
- Coordinates: 39°34′10″N 26°37′10″E
- Country: Turkey
- Province: Çanakkale
- District: Ayvacık
- Elevation: 280 m (920 ft)
- Population (2021): 396
- Time zone: UTC+3 (TRT)
- Postal code: 17980
- Area code: 0286

Adatepe is a village in the Küçükkuyu belde, in Ayvacık District of Çanakkale Province in northwestern Turkey. Its population is 396 (2021). The village was revived in the 1980s when the traditional stone houses were restored by people seeking to escape city life.

== Location ==
The village is situated 280 m (920 ft) above sea level on the western foothill of Mount Ida (Turkish: Kaz Dağı) north of Edremit Gulf in Biga Peninsula. It is 105 km (65 mi) from the province center Çanakkale, 35 km (22 mi) from district center Ayvacık.

== History ==
Up on a hill overlooking the environs and the Edremit Gulf with the islands off Ayvalık and Lesbos, a historical site is situated with a stone chamber and water-filled cistern attributed as a Zeus altar. It is believed that according to Homer's epic poem Iliad, king of the gods Zeus watched the Trojan Wars from this place.

Historically, the village was co-inhabited by Greeks in Turkey and Turks. In 1905, around 600 Orthodox Greeks lived in the village, where a church named "Koimēsis tēs Theotokou" (Greek for "Dormition of the Mother of God") stood. The village was named Adatepe in 1912. It was one of the places in Turkey where Greeks and Turks lived together and shared their cultures. Locals reported there was a continued Turkish tradition since Seljuk times in the village as well as a Greek lifestyle the Turkish population lived with tin the Greek structures. During the population exchange between Greece and Turkey by 1924, Muslim Cretan Turks settled replacing the Greek Orthodox population in the village.

== Village ==
The buildings in the village have Greek and Turkish architecture. The original houses in the village are made of stone, and have two stories in general. All houses have a courtyard and a garden. The village is surrounded by olive groves. In the 1980s, a group of people, who escaped the big city life, came to Adatepe, which was about to turn into a ghost town towards the end of the 1980s. People from Ankara, İzmir and mostly from Istanbul purchased buildings, which could be regarded as ruined, and converted them into living spaces by keeping their traditional Greek and Turkish architecture. Today, the newcomers and the locals live in harmony. The total houses in the village number 380, and Adatepe was declared in 1989 an urban protected area of first grade, being the only one with this status in the region.

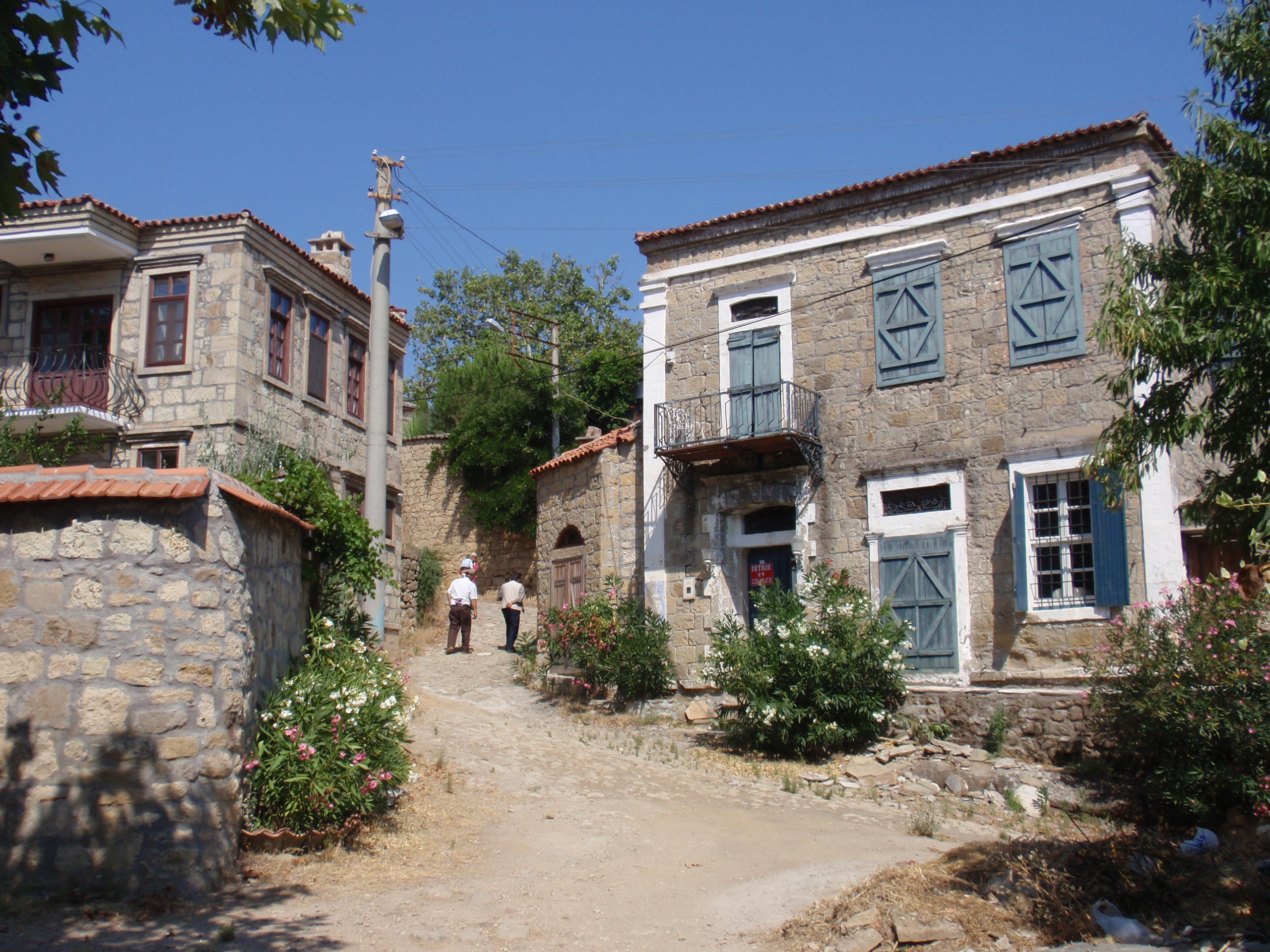
Adatepe stone houses

== Economy ==
Some of the more than a hundred restored stone buildings are used as tourist accommodation. Around two hundred thousand tourists visit Adatepe yearly.

In Küçükkuyu, there is the Adatepe Olive Oil Museum located near the village, which produces cold-pressed olive oil and olive oil-based soaps scented with lavender, laurel and rosemary. The olive-based diverse products, of which packagings are adorned with a Greek girl picture, are also exported.
