= Abraham Kidunaia =

Syriac Christian hermit and priest

Saint Abraham Kidunaia
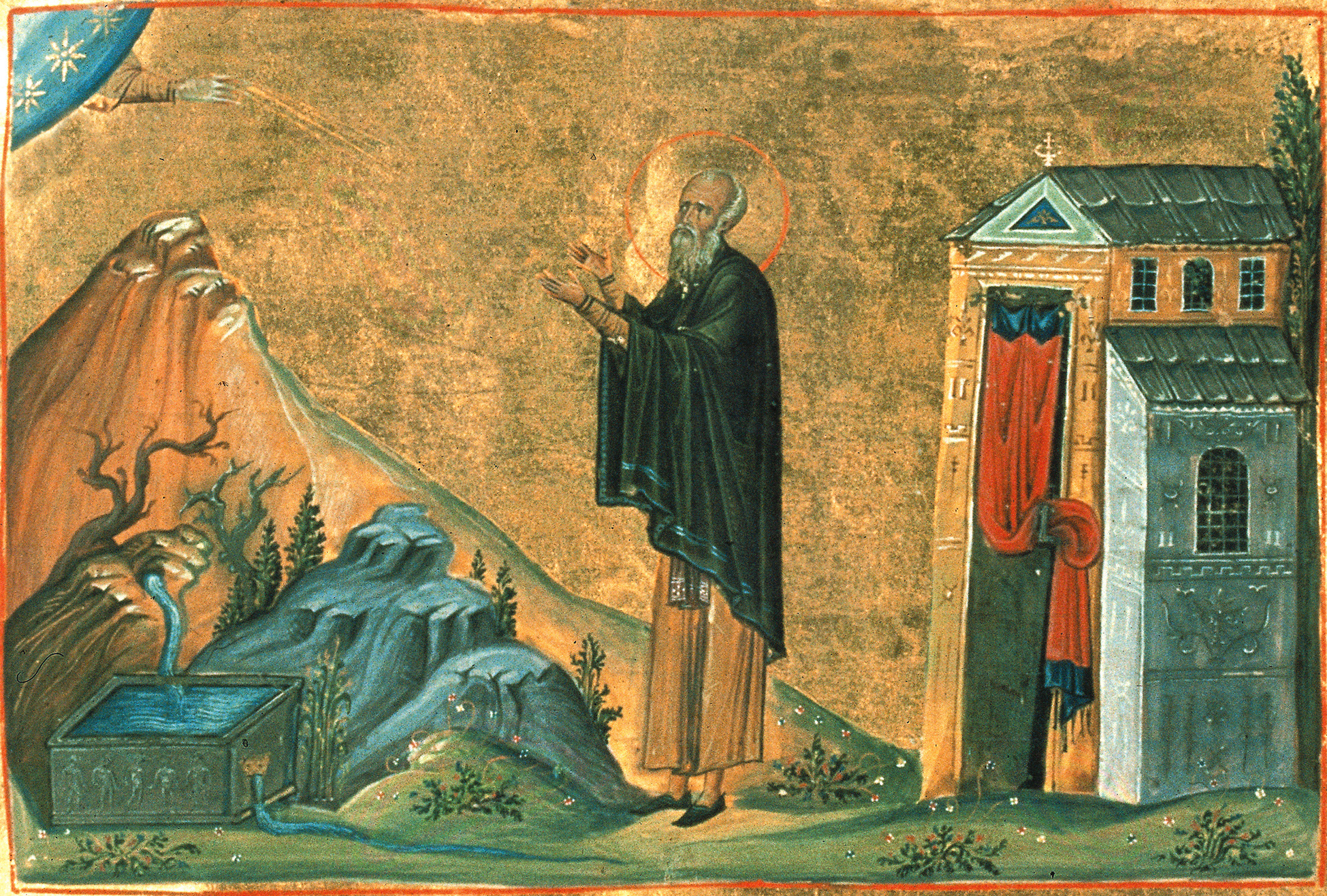
- Miniature from the Menologion of Basil II

Hermit and Priest
- Born: between c. 290-296; Edessa
- Died: between c. 360-366; Assos, in the Troad, Asia Minor (modern-day Behram, Ayvacık, Çanakkale, Turkey)
- Venerated in: Catholic Church; Eastern Orthodox Church; Oriental Orthodoxy
- Feast: July 29; October 24; October 29; December 14

Abraham Kidunaia (died c. 366) was a Syriac Christian hermit and priest. He is venerated as a saint in Catholicism, Eastern Orthodoxy and Oriental Orthodoxy.

== Biography ==
The Vita of St. Abraham was written by his friend, St. Ephrem.

Abraham was born to a wealthy family near Edessa, during the third century. After receiving an excellent education, Abraham was encouraged to get married. He followed the wishes of his parents, but shortly before the wedding ceremony, he told his bride his desire to dedicate his life to God. His bride accepted this resolution and Abraham retired to a cell near the city, where he walled up the cell door, leaving only a small window open for food to be brought him.

Ten years after he retreated from the world, his parents died, leaving Abraham a wealthy man. He had the inheritance distributed to the poor. Abraham became known throughout the region as a holy man and many came to him for guidance. Reports of his reputation came to the Bishop of Edessa who ordained him a priest and sent Abraham to Beth-Kidunaa. When Abraham destroyed the pagan idols and altars, the outraged townspeople drove him away. Abraham would return and urge them to give up their superstitions, and be driven out again. Eventually his persistence began to yield results.

Abraham worked among them for the three years, when fearing that he would begin to desire material possessions he returned to his cell near Edessa where he spent the next fifty years in prayer and penance. He was known never to reprove anyone sharply but always with charity and gentleness.

Around the year 360 Abraham died at the age of seventy after a long life of service to God.

== Legend ==
A popular story recounts that his orphan niece Mary had been entrusted to his care. He built a cell near his own and trained her in learning and piety until she was twenty. At this point, seduced by a false monk, she ran away ashamed and went to Troad, where she wound up a prostitute. For two years he lamented her departure not knowing what happened. When he finally learned where she was, he boldly went and recovered her.

== Veneration ==
The feast day of Saint Abraham is October 29 in the Eastern Orthodox Church and in the Catholic Church. The Syriac Catholic Church commemorates him on December 14, the Coptic Church on July 29, the Syriac Orthodox Church on October 24.

== See also ==
- Anchorite
- Abramius the Recluse
