= Şapköy =

Şapköy can refer to:

- Şapköy, Ayvacık
- Şapköy, Ezine
