= Erecek =

Erecek can refer to:

- Erecek, Ayvacık
- Erecek, Refahiye
