= Çınarpınar =

Çınarpınar can refer to:

- Çınarpınar, Ayvacık
- Çınarpınar, Gönen
