= Tabaklar =

Tabaklar (literally "dishes" or "tanners" in Turkish) may refer to the following places in Turkey:

- Tabaklar, Ayvacık
- Tabaklar, Emirdağ, a village in the district of Emirdağ, Afyonkarahisar Province
- Tabaklar, Karataş, a village in the district of Karataş, Adana Province
