= Yeniçam =

Yeniçam can refer to:

- Yeniçam, Ayvacık
- Yeniçam, Buldan
