= Sapanca (disambiguation) =

Sapanca can refer to:

- Sapanca
- Sapanca, Ayvacık
- Sapanca, Sur
- Sapanca railway station
- Lake Sapanca
