= Güzelköy =

Güzelköy may refer to the following places in Turkey:

- Güzelköy, Ayvacık, in the District of Ayvacık, Çanakkale Province
- Güzelköy, Bismil, in the District of Bismil, Diyarbakır Province
- Güzelköy, Karacasu, in the District of Karacasu, Aydın Province
- Güzelköy, Köşk, in the District of Köşk, Aydın Province
- Güzelköy, Mut, in the District of Mut, Mersin Province
- Güzelköy, Nazilli, in the District of Nazilli, Aydın Province
- Güzelköy, Nizip, historically Tabya or Tayyiba, in Gaziantep Province
- Güzelköy, Tavas, in the District of Tavas, Denizli Province
- Güzelköy, Yenişehir, in the District of Yenişehir, Diyarbakır Province
