= Korubaşı =

Korubaşı can refer to:

- Korubaşı, Ayvacık
- Korubaşı, Gazipaşa
- Korubaşı, Taşova
