= Nusratlı =

Nusratlı can refer to:

- Nusratlı, Ayvacık
- Nusratlı, Bolvadin
