= Cleanthes =

3rd-century BC Greek philosopher

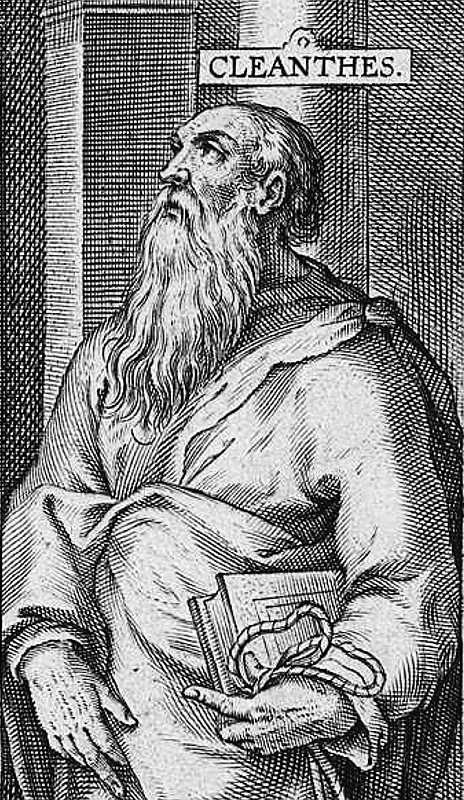
- Cleanthes, engraving from 1605
- Born: c. 330 BC; Assos (now Ayvacık, Çanakkale, Turkey)
- Died: c. 230 BC; Athens

Philosophical work
- Era: Hellenistic philosophy
- Region: Western philosophy
- School: Stoicism
- Main interests: Physics, ethics

Cleanthes (/kliˈænθiːz/; Ancient Greek: Κλεάνθης; c. 330 BC – c. 230 BC), of Assos, was a Greek Stoic philosopher and boxer who was the successor to Zeno of Citium as the second head (scholarch) of the Stoic school in Athens. Originally a boxer, he came to Athens where he took up philosophy, listening to Zeno's lectures. He supported himself by working as a water-carrier at night. After the death of Zeno, c. 262 BC, he became the head of the school, a post he held for the next 32 years. Cleanthes successfully preserved and developed Zeno's doctrines. He originated new ideas in Stoic physics, and developed Stoicism in accordance with the principles of materialism and pantheism. Among the fragments of Cleanthes' writings which have come down to us, the largest is a Hymn to Zeus. His pupil was Chrysippus who became one of the most important Stoic thinkers.

== Life ==
Cleanthes was born in Assos in the Troad, about 330 BC. (Note: According to Apollodorus as quoted by Philodemus, Cleanthes was born in Aristophanes' archonship (331/0 BC) and died in Jason's Archonship (230/29 BC). Pseudo-Lucian, Valerius Maximus, and Censorinus say that Cleanthes lived to the age of 99 (although Diogenes Laërtius says he died at the age of 80.) Dorandi prefers an age of 101. For more information see Dorandi 1999, p. 38.) According to Diogenes Laërtius, he was the son of Phanias, and early in life he was a successful boxer. With but four drachmae in his possession he came to Athens, where he took up philosophy, listening first to the lectures of Crates the Cynic, and then to those of Zeno, the Stoic. In order to support himself, he worked all night as water-carrier to a gardener (hence his nickname the Well-Water-Collector, Greek: Φρεάντλης). As he spent the whole day in studying philosophy with no visible means of support, he was summoned before the Areopagus to account for his way of living. The judges were so delighted by the evidence of work which he produced, that they voted him ten minae, though Zeno would not permit him to accept them. His power of patient endurance, or perhaps his slowness, earned him the title of "the Ass" from his fellow students, a name which he was said to have rejoiced in, as it implied that his back was strong enough to bear whatever Zeno put upon it.

Such was the esteem awakened by his high moral qualities that, on the death of Zeno in 262 BC, he became the leader of the school. He continued, however, to support himself by the labour of his own hands. Among his pupils were his successor, Chrysippus, and Antigonus II Gonatas, from whom he accepted 3000 minae. He died at the age of 99, c. 230 BC. We are told that a dangerous ulcer had compelled him to fast for a time. Subsequently he continued his abstinence, saying that, as he was already half-way on the road to death, he would not trouble to retrace his steps.

Simplicius, writing in the 6th century AD, mentions that a statue of Cleanthes was still visible at Assos, which had been erected by the Roman Senate.

== Philosophy ==
Cleanthes was an important figure in the development of Stoicism, and stamped his personality on the physical speculations of the school, and by his materialism gave a unity to the Stoic system. He wrote some fifty works, of which only fragments have survived, preserved by writers such as Diogenes Laërtius, Stobaeus, Cicero, Seneca and Plutarch.

=== Physics ===
Cleanthes revolutionized Stoic physics by the theory of tension (tonos) which distinguished Stoic materialism from all conception of matter as dead and inert. He developed Stoic pantheism, and applied his materialistic views to logic and ethics. Thus he argued that the soul was a material substance, and that this was proved (a) by the circumstance that not only bodily qualities, but also mental capacity, are transmitted by ordinary generation from parent to child; and (b) by the sympathy of the soul with the body seen in the fact that, when the body is struck or cut, the soul is pained; and when the soul is torn by anxiety or depressed by care, the body is correspondingly affected. Cleanthes also taught that souls live on after death, but that the intensity of its existence would vary according to the strength or weakness of the particular soul.

Cleanthes regarded the Sun as being divine; because the Sun sustains all living things, it resembled the divine fire which (in Stoic physics) animated all living beings, hence it too must be part of the vivifying fire or aether of the universe. Some maintain that he accused Aristarchus of impiety for daring to put into motion "the hearth of the universe" (i.e. the Earth); this interpretation depends on an emendation of the received text, since in the manuscripts it is Aristarchus that did the accusing. The largest surviving fragment of Cleanthes is the portion of the Hymn to Zeus, which has been preserved in Stobaeus, in which he declares praise and honour of Zeus to be the highest privilege of all rational beings.

=== Ethics ===
Cleanthes maintained that pleasure is not only not a good, but is "contrary to nature" and "worthless." It was his opinion that the passions (love, fear, grief) are weaknesses: they lack the strain or tension which he persistently emphasized, and on which the strength of the soul, no less than that of the body, depends, and which constitutes in human beings self-control, and moral strength, and also conditions every virtue. He said in a striking passage: "People walk in wickedness all their lives or, at any rate, for the greater part of it. If they ever attain to virtue, it is late and at the very sunset of their days."

Zeno had said that the goal of life was "to live consistently," the implication being that no life but the passionless life of reason could ultimately be consistent with itself. Cleanthes is credited with having added the words "with nature," thus completing the well-known Stoic formula that the goal is "to live consistently with nature." For Cleanthes, this meant, in the first place, living conformably to the course of the universe; for the universe is under the governance of reason, and everyone has it as their privilege to know or become acquainted with the world-course, to recognize it as rational and cheerfully to conform to it. This, according to him, is true freedom of will not acting without motive, or apart from set purpose, or capriciously, but humbly acquiescing in the universal order, and, therefore, in everything that befalls one. The direction to follow Universal Nature can be traced in his famous prayer:

Lead me, Zeus, and you too, Destiny,
To wherever your decrees have assigned me.
I follow readily, but if I choose not,
Wretched though I am, I must follow still.
Fate guides the willing, but drags the unwilling.

== Modern influence ==
Most notably, a fictionalized version of Cleanthes appears as one of the three main interlocutors in David Hume's Dialogues Concerning Natural Religion, where he defends the view that a posteriori knowledge of the existence and nature of God is possible for us.

Cleanthes also appears in José Enrique Rodó's essay Ariel, in which he is depicted as meditating on the teachings of Zeno as he carried water all through the night.

== See also ==
- Acts 17:28

== Notes ==
Preceded by Zeno of Citium	Leader of the Stoic school 262–230 BC	Succeeded by Chrysippus
