= Baharlar =

Baharlar can refer to:

- Baharlar, Ayvacık
- Baharlar, Lice
- Baharlar, Tavas
