= Abraham the Great =

Abraham the Great may refer to:

- Abraham Kidunaia (c. 290–296–c. 360–366), Syriac Christian hermit, priest, and saint
- Abraham the Great of Kashkar (c. 492–586), monk and saint of the Assyrian Church of the East
