= Yeşilyurt Village Mosque =

Mosque located in Ayvacık, Çanakkale

- Yeşilyurt Köyü Camii
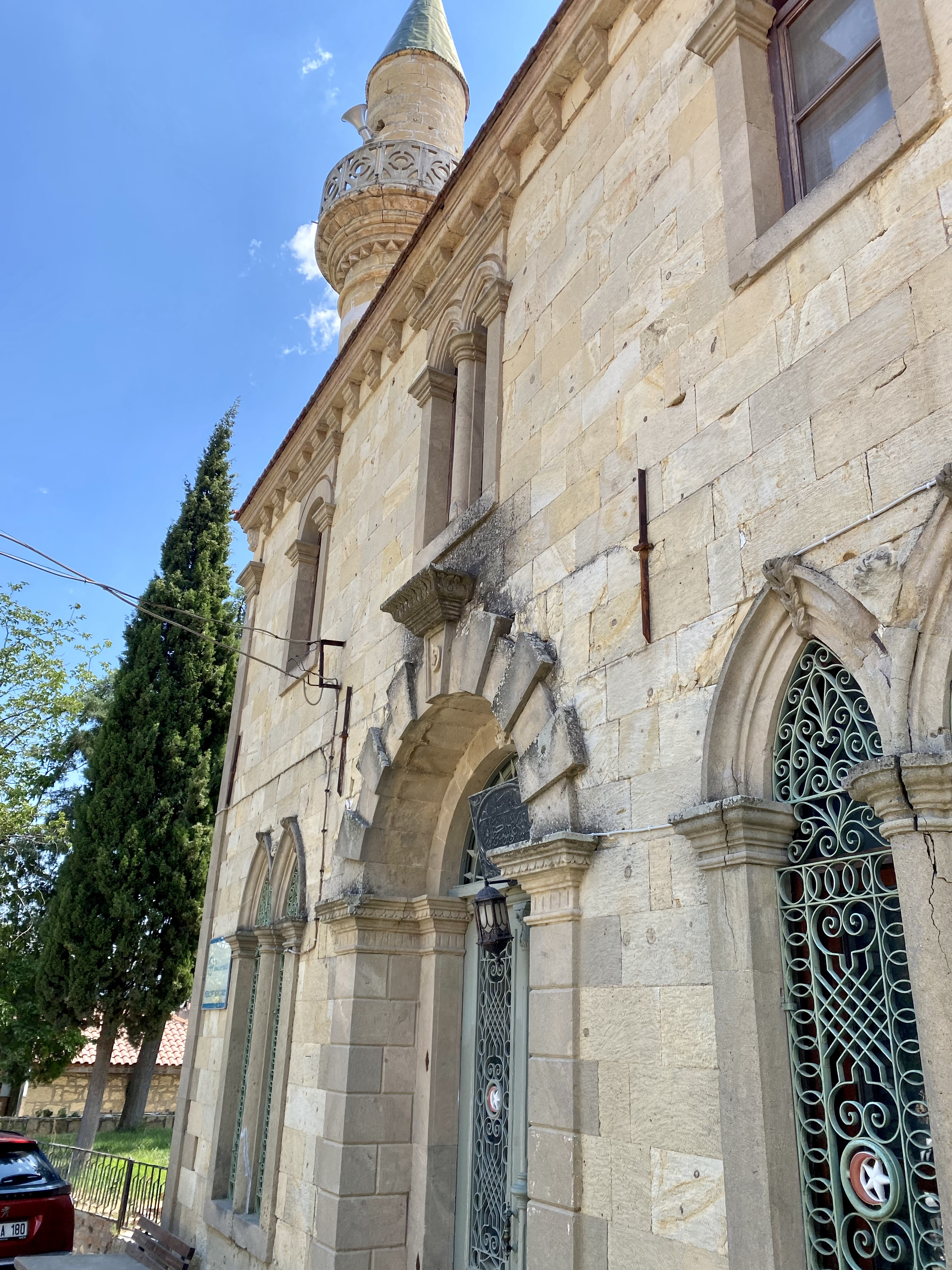

- Location within Marmara Location within Turkey

Religion
- Affiliation: Islam
- District: Ayvacık
- Province: Çanakkale

Location
- Country: Turkey
- Interactive map of Yeşilyurt Village Mosque
- Coordinates: 39.556958°N 26.569875°E

Architecture
- Type: Ottoman
- Completed: circa 1900

Specifications
- Minaret: 1
- Materials: Stone

Yeşilyurt Village Mosque is a historical mosque built in the Ottoman period (1900s). The mosque located in Yeşilyurt Village of Ayvacık district of Çanakkale province.

At the entrance of the mosque, there is the date of 1322 Hijri. Due to the work of Greeks during the construction of the mosque and the influence of their culture, the architectural type of the mosque is reminiscent of the church. There are star and crescent motifs inside the building.
