= Ahmetler =

Ahmetler may refer to the following places in Turkey:

- Ahmetler, Ayvacık
- Ahmetler, Biga
- Ahmetler, Bolu, a village in the district of Bolu, Bolu Province
- Ahmetler, Gerede, a village in the district of Gerede, Bolu Province
- Ahmetler, Manavgat, a village in the district of Manavgat, Antalya Province
- Ahmetler, Pazaryeri, a village in the district of Pazaryeri, Bilecik Province
