= Kozlu =

Kozlu may refer to:

- Kozlu, Zonguldak, a town in northern Turkey
- Kozlu coal mine in Kozlu, Zonguldak
- Kozlu, Seydişehir, a village in Turkey
- Kozlu, Gercüş, a town in southeastern Turkey
- Kozlu, Ayvacık
- Kozlu, Pazaryolu
- Kozlu, Sındırgı, a village
