= Babadere, Ayvacık =

Village in Turkey

Babadere
- Village
- Location in Turkey Babadere (Marmara)
- Coordinates: 39°36′33″N 26°11′23″E
- Country: Turkey
- Province: Çanakkale
- District: Ayvacık
- Population (2021): 124
- Time zone: UTC+3 (TRT)

Babadere is a village in the Ayvacık District of Çanakkale Province in Turkey. Its population is 124 (2021).
