= Çamköy, Ayvacık =

Village in Turkey

Çamköy
- Village
- Location in Turkey Çamköy (Marmara)
- Coordinates: 39.5652°N 26.2194°E
- Country: Turkey
- Province: Çanakkale
- District: Ayvacık
- Population (2021): 69
- Time zone: UTC+3 (TRT)

Çamköy is a village in the Ayvacık District of Çanakkale Province in Turkey. Its population is 69 (2021).
