= Bademli, Ayvacık =

Village in Turkey

Bademli
- Village
- Location in Turkey Bademli (Marmara)
- Coordinates: 39.4966°N 26.1684°E
- Country: Turkey
- Province: Çanakkale
- District: Ayvacık
- Population (2021): 243
- Time zone: UTC+3 (TRT)

Bademli is a village in the Ayvacık District of Çanakkale Province in Turkey. Its population is 243 (2021).
