= Büyükhusun, Ayvacık =

Village in Turkey

Büyükhusun
- Village
- Location in Turkey Büyükhusun (Marmara)
- Coordinates: 39°31′N 26°24′E
- Country: Turkey
- Province: Çanakkale
- District: Ayvacık
- Population (2021): 360
- Time zone: UTC+3 (TRT)

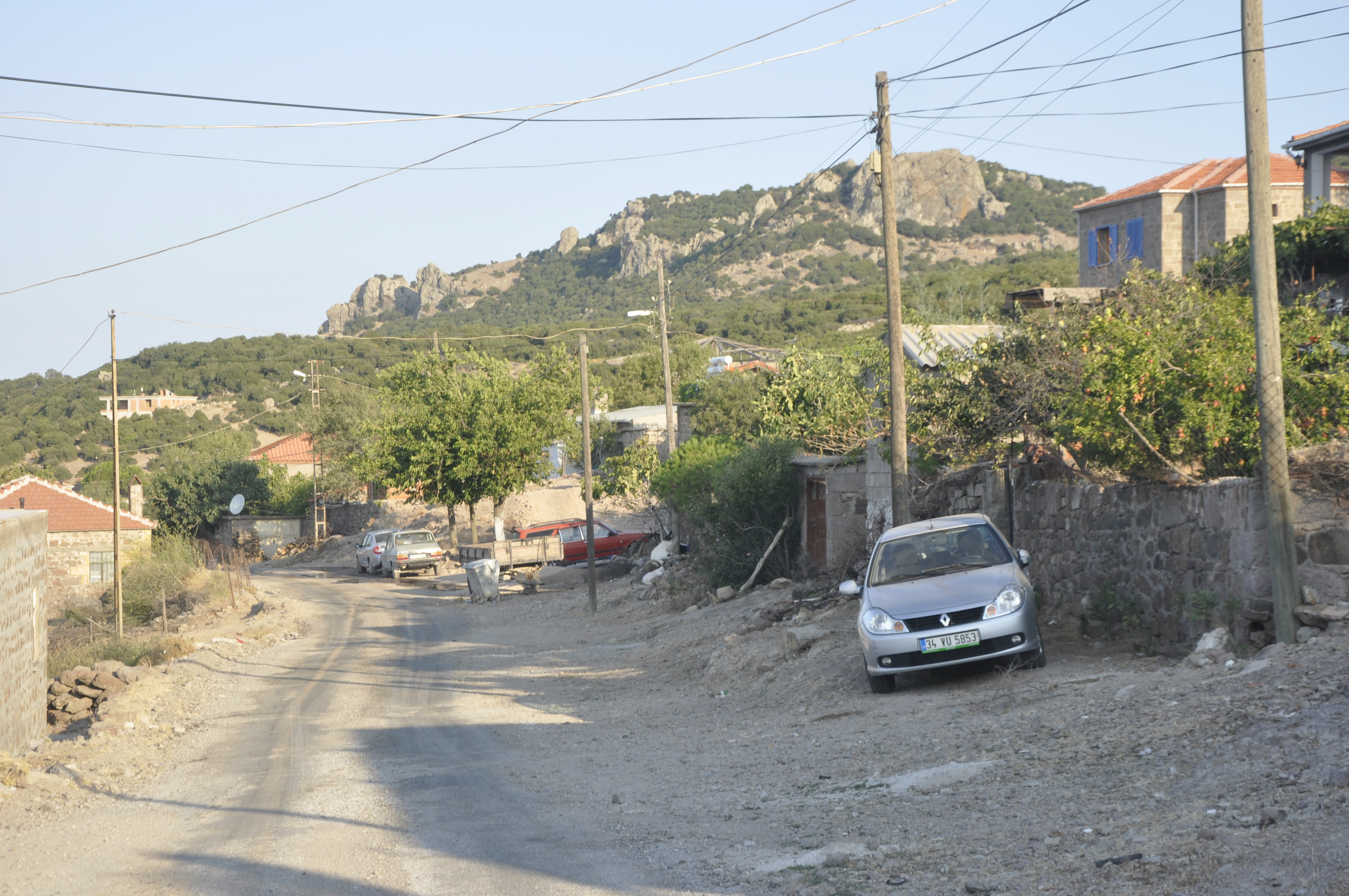
Büyükhusun village

Büyükhusun is a village in the Ayvacık District of Çanakkale Province in Turkey. Its population is 360 (2021).
