= Behram, Ayvacık =

Village in Turkey

Behram
- Village
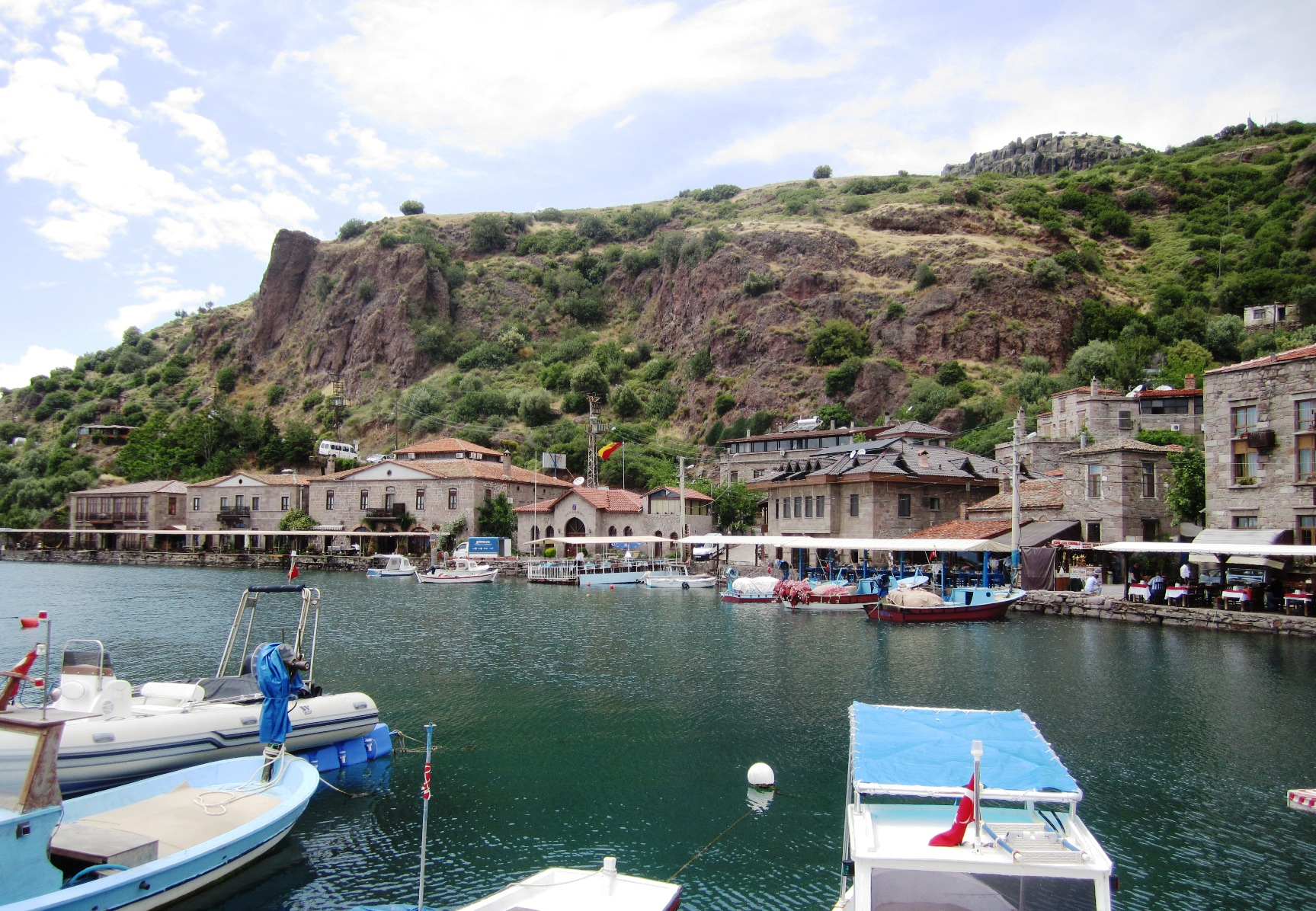

- Location within Turkey Location within Marmara
- Coordinates: 39.4937°N 26.3319°E
- Country: Turkey
- Province: Çanakkale
- District: Ayvacık
- Population (2021): 652
- Time zone: UTC+3 (TRT)

Behram is a village in the Ayvacık District of Çanakkale Province in Turkey. Its population is 652 (2021). The ruins of Assos lie near the village.
