= Kuruoba, Ayvacık =

Village in Turkey

Kuruoba
- Village
- Location in Turkey Kuruoba (Marmara)
- Coordinates: 39°30′17″N 26°15′12″E
- Country: Turkey
- Province: Çanakkale
- District: Ayvacık
- Population (2021): 158
- Time zone: UTC+3 (TRT)

Kuruoba is a village in the Ayvacık District of Çanakkale Province in Turkey. Its population is 158 (2021).
