= Budaklar, Ayvacık =

Village in Turkey

Budaklar
- Village
- Location in Turkey Budaklar (Marmara)
- Coordinates: 39.6340°N 26.3802°E
- Country: Turkey
- Province: Çanakkale
- District: Ayvacık
- Population (2021): 34
- Time zone: UTC+3 (TRT)

Budaklar is a village in the Ayvacık District of Çanakkale Province in Turkey. Its population is 34 (2021).
