= Naldöken, Ayvacık =

Village in Turkey

Naldöken
- Village
- Location in Turkey Naldöken (Marmara)
- Coordinates: 39.5897°N 26.1985°E
- Country: Turkey
- Province: Çanakkale
- District: Ayvacık
- Population (2021): 316
- Time zone: UTC+3 (TRT)

Naldöken is a village in the Ayvacık District of Çanakkale Province in Turkey. Its population is 316 (2021).
