= Ayvacık District, Çanakkale =

District of Çanakkale Province, Turkey

Ayvacık District
- District
- Map showing Ayvacık District in Çanakkale Province

- Location in Turkey Ayvacık District (Marmara)
- Coordinates: 39°36′N 26°24′E
- Country: Turkey
- Province: Çanakkale
- Seat: Ayvacık

Government
  - Kaymakam: İlker Eker
- Area: 880 km^{2} (340 sq mi)
- Population (2021): 34,103
  - Density: 39/km^{2} (100/sq mi)
- Time zone: UTC+3 (TRT)
- Website: www.canakkale-ayvacik.gov.tr

Ayvacık District is a district of the Çanakkale Province of Turkey. Its seat is the town of Ayvacık. Its area is 880 km^{2}, and its population is 34,103 (2021).

== Composition ==
There are two municipalities in Ayvacık District:

- Ayvacık
- Küçükkuyu

There are 64 villages in Ayvacık District:

- Adatepe
- Ahmetçe
- Ahmetler
- Akçin
- Arıklı
- Babadere
- Babakale
- Bademli
- Baharlar
- Bahçedere
- Balabanlı
- Behram
- Bektaş
- Bilaller
- Budaklar
- Büyükhusun
- Çakmaklar
- Çaltı
- Çamkalabak
- Çamköy
- Cemaller
- Çınarpınar
- Demirci
- Dibekli
- Erecek
- Gülpınar
- Güzelköy
- Hüseyinfakı
- İlyasfakı
- Kayalar
- Keçikaya
- Kestanelik
- Kırca
- Kısacık
- Kocaköy
- Korubaşı
- Kösedere
- Koyunevi
- Kozlu
- Küçükçetmi
- Küçükhusun
- Kulfal
- Kuruoba
- Misvak
- Naldöken
- Nusratlı
- Paşaköy
- Pınardere
- Sapanca
- Şapköy
- Sazlı
- Söğütlü
- Süleymanköy
- Tabaklar
- Tamış
- Tartaşık
- Taşağıl
- Taşboğaz
- Tuzla
- Tuztaşı
- Uzunalan
- Yeniçam
- Yeşilyurt
- Yukarıköy
