= Cemaller, Ayvacık =

Village in Turkey

Cemaller
- Village
- Country: Turkey
- Province: Çanakkale
- District: Ayvacık
- Population (2021): 25
- Time zone: UTC+3 (TRT)

Cemaller is a village in the Ayvacık District of Çanakkale Province in Turkey. Its population is 25 (2021).
