= Misvak, Ayvacık =

Village in Turkey

Misvak
- Village
- Location in Turkey Misvak (Marmara)
- Coordinates: 39°40′N 26°28′E
- Country: Turkey
- Province: Çanakkale
- District: Ayvacık
- Population (2021): 134
- Time zone: UTC+3 (TRT)

Misvak is a village in the Ayvacık District of Çanakkale Province in Turkey. Its population is 134 (2021).
