= Koyunevi, Ayvacık =

Village in Turkey

Koyunevi
- Village
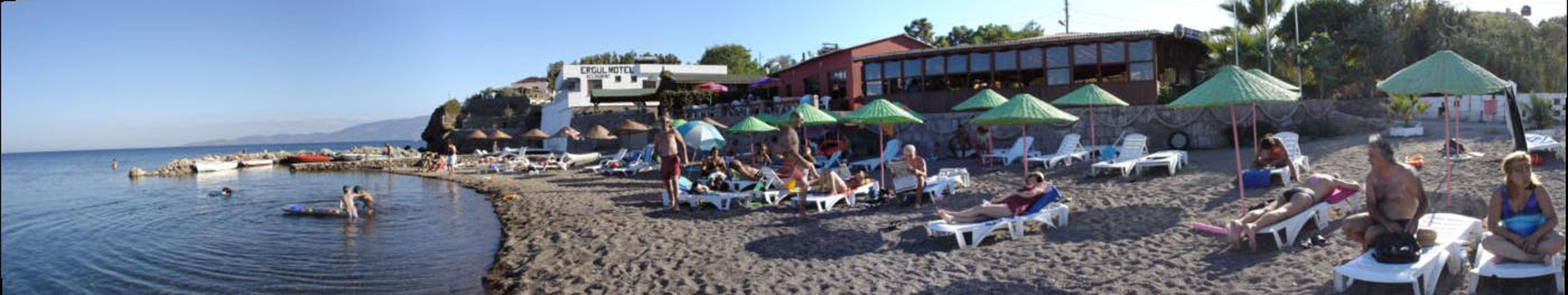

- Location within Turkey Location within Marmara
- Country: Turkey
- Province: Çanakkale
- District: Ayvacık
- Population (2021): 240
- Time zone: UTC+3 (TRT)

Koyunevi is a village in the Ayvacık District of Çanakkale Province in Turkey. Its population is 240 (2021).
