= Bilaller, Ayvacık =

Village in Turkey

Bilaller
- Village
- Location in Turkey Bilaller (Marmara)
- Coordinates: 39.6489°N 26.3731°E
- Country: Turkey
- Province: Çanakkale
- District: Ayvacık
- Population (2021): 110
- Time zone: UTC+3 (TRT)

Bilaller is a village in the Ayvacık District of Çanakkale Province in Turkey. Its population is 110 (2021).
