= Paşaköy, Ayvacık =

Village in Turkey

Paşaköy
- Village
- Country: Turkey
- Province: Çanakkale
- District: Ayvacık
- Population (2021): 425
- Time zone: UTC+3 (TRT)

Paşaköy is a village in the Ayvacık District of Çanakkale Province in Turkey. Its population is 425 (2021).
