= Yeşilyurt, Ayvacık =

Village in Turkey

Yeşilyurt
- Village
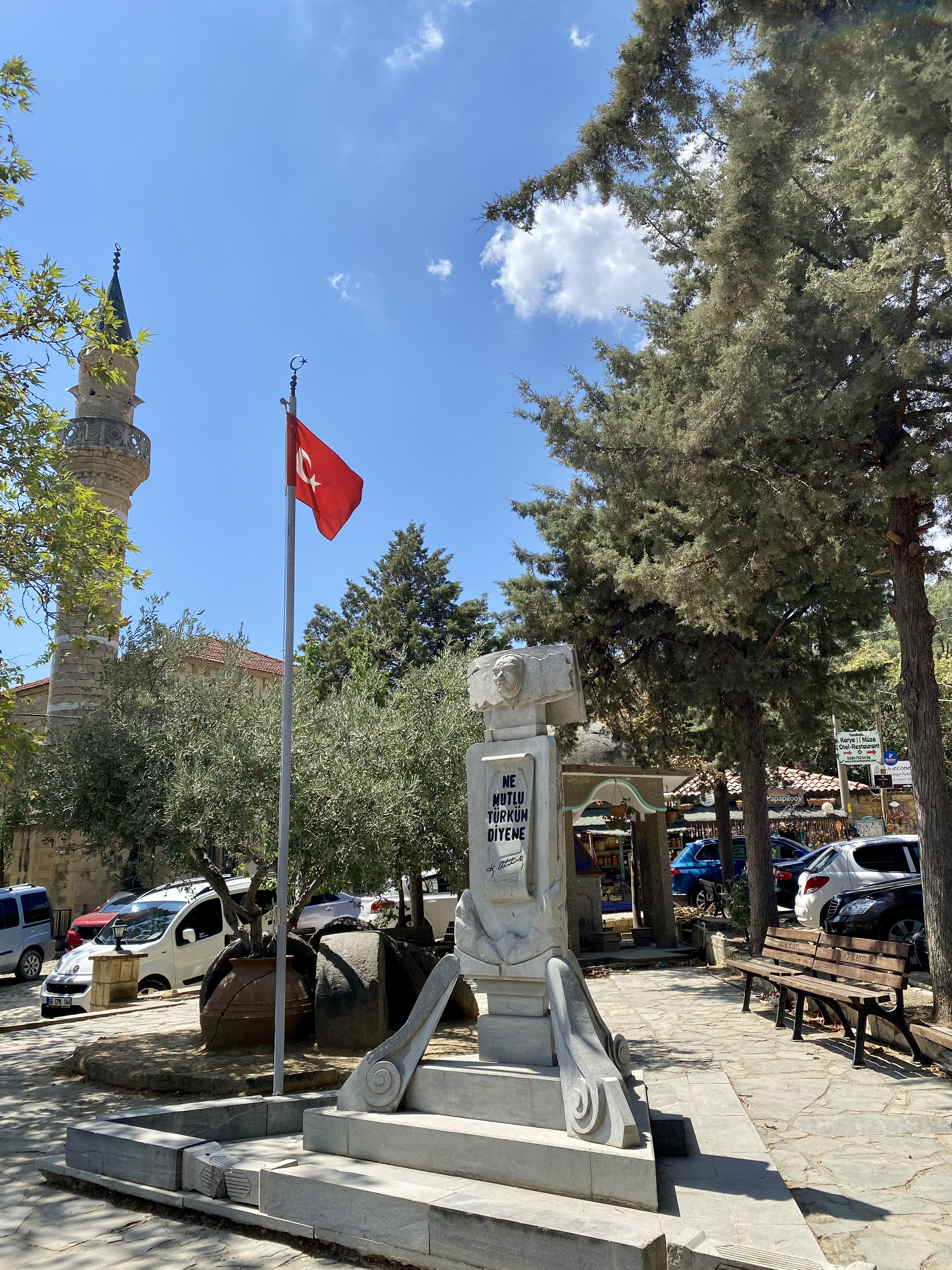

- Location within Turkey Location within Marmara
- Coordinates: 39°33′27″N 26°34′12″E
- Country: Turkey
- Province: Çanakkale
- District: Ayvacık
- Population (2021): 166
- Time zone: UTC+3 (TRT)

Yeşilyurt is a village in the Ayvacık District of Çanakkale Province in Turkey. Its population is 166 (2021). Yeşilyurt Village Mosque is located in this village.
