= Bahçedere, Ayvacık =

Village in Turkey

Bahçedere
- Village
- Location in Turkey Bahçedere (Marmara)
- Coordinates: 39.5942°N 26.6238°E
- Country: Turkey
- Province: Çanakkale
- District: Ayvacık
- Population (2021): 206
- Time zone: UTC+3 (TRT)

Bahçedere is a village in the Ayvacık District of Çanakkale Province in Turkey. Its population is 206 (2021).
