= Balabanlı, Ayvacık =

Village in Turkey

Balabanlı
- Village
- Location in Turkey Balabanlı (Marmara)
- Coordinates: 39.5053°N 26.2133°E
- Country: Turkey
- Province: Çanakkale
- District: Ayvacık
- Population (2021): 218
- Time zone: UTC+3 (TRT)

Balabanlı is a village in the Ayvacık District of Çanakkale Province in Turkey. Its population is 218 (2021).
