= Demirci, Ayvacık =

Village in Turkey

Demirci
- Village
- Country: Turkey
- Province: Çanakkale
- District: Ayvacık
- Population (2021): 73
- Time zone: UTC+3 (TRT)

Demirci is a village in the Ayvacık District of Çanakkale Province in Turkey. Its population is 73 (2021).
