= Küçükçetmi, Ayvacık =

Village in Turkey

Küçükçetmi
- Village
- Location in Turkey Küçükçetmi (Marmara)
- Coordinates: 39°33′37″N 26°35′05″E
- Country: Turkey
- Province: Çanakkale
- District: Ayvacık
- Population (2021): 220
- Time zone: UTC+3 (TRT)

Küçükçetmi is a village in the Ayvacık District of Çanakkale Province in Turkey. Its population is 220 (2021).
