= Keçikaya, Ayvacık =

Village in Turkey

Keçikaya
- Village
- Location in Turkey Keçikaya (Marmara)
- Coordinates: 39°36′15″N 26°21′10″E
- Country: Turkey
- Province: Çanakkale
- District: Ayvacık
- Population (2021): 76
- Time zone: UTC+3 (TRT)

Keçikaya is a village in the Ayvacık District of Çanakkale Province in Turkey. Its population is 76 (2021).
