= Tuzla, Ayvacık =

Village in Turkey

Tuzla
- Village
- Location in Turkey Tuzla (Marmara)
- Coordinates: 39°34′07″N 26°10′02″E
- Country: Turkey
- Province: Çanakkale
- District: Ayvacık
- Population (2021): 537
- Time zone: UTC+3 (TRT)

Tuzla is a village in the Ayvacık District of Çanakkale Province in Turkey. Its population is 537 (2021).
