= 1944 Bolu–Gerede earthquake =

Earthquake in northwest Turkey

- Location within Turkey
- UTC time: 1944-02-01 03:22:40
- ISC event: 899277
- USGS-ANSS: ComCat
- Local date: 1 February 1944
- Local time: 05:22:40
- Magnitude: 7.74 M_{w}
- Epicenter: 40.81°N 32.23°E
- Areas affected: Turkey
- Total damage: 20,865 houses destroyed
- Max. intensity: MMI IX (Violent) – MMI X (Extreme)
- Casualties: 4,270 dead

The 1944 Bolu–Gerede earthquake occurred at 05:22 local time on 1 February. The earthquake had an estimated magnitude of 7.74 M_{w} and a maximum felt intensity of IX–X (Violent–Extreme) on the Mercalli intensity scale. It ruptured part of the North Anatolian Fault, forming part of a progressive sequence of events that generally migrated westwards along the fault zone, starting with the 1939 Erzincan earthquake.

== Tectonic setting ==
Both Bolu and Gerede lie close to the active North Anatolian Fault (NAF), a major right-lateral strike-slip fault zone that forms the transform boundary between the Anatolian plate and the Eurasian plate to the north. The Anatolian plate is being driven westwards by the northward movement of the Arabian plate. It runs from the Karlıova triple junction in the east to the northern Aegean Sea in the west. The NAF is formed of many individual strands and segments, most of which are associated with historical earthquakes. Earthquakes along the NAF tend to occur in mostly westward migrating sequences over a period of decades, interpreted to be a result of Coulomb stress transfer, as each earthquake increases the stress on the next segment of the fault zone, bringing it closer to failure. Most recently, such a sequence began with the 1939 Erzincan earthquake. A previous sequence started in 1668.

== Earthquake ==
Based on extensive field investigations and the analysis of repeat geodetic measurements, the earthquake's rupture is interpreted to extend from near Lake Abant in the west to Osmangölü in the east, a total of 191 km. The fault plane is interpreted to be near vertical, with an average width of 16 km. The average strike-slip component of displacement is 4.40 m, with a normal dip-slip component of 1.02 m. These parameters give a moment magnitude of 7.74. The maximum strike-slip offset of 7.16 m was measured near Gerede and this is thought to be close to the epicentre.

The earthquake was followed by 22 aftershocks on the same day as the mainshock. The largest aftershock occurred on 11 February, with an epicentre close to that of the mainshock near Gerede. It was followed by many tremors including three strong shocks the following morning.

== Damage ==
High levels of damage and large numbers of casualties occurred within a zone about 200 km long by 25 km wide, with Gerede being the most badly affected place.

In Gerede, telegraph and telephone lines were badly damaged, disrupting communications with the rest of the country, in the immediate aftermath of the earthquake. Information was also slow to emerge from some of the surrounding villages due to the roads being blocked by continuous snowfalls. This wintry weather also delayed the arrival of relief supplies from Ankara, requiring soldiers to be deployed to clear the roads. Once aid supplies began to reach Gerede, the Red Crescent set up a hospital. Bolu lost electric power and also suffered damage to telegraph and telephone lines, meaning that information on earthquake effects was delayed. Bread was in short supply due to damage to bakeries, something that was addressed by the Red Crescent, who sent 200 sacks of flour, amongst other aid. In all in Bolu Province, 4,217 houses were completely destroyed and another 4,284 houses suffered serious to moderate levels of damage.

In Çankırı Province, the Çerkeş District was the most seriously affected, with 1,192 houses completely destroyed and a further 1,148 too damaged to be occupied. Train tracks near Çerkeş were damaged such that no aid could be brought in that way nor injured people evacuated to hospitals, until the damage was repaired. In Zonguldak Province, the Safranbolu District (now part of Karabük Province), was the worst affected with 150 houses destroyed and a further 56 houses left uninhabitable in the surrounding villages. The districts of Devrek and Çaycuma also suffered significant damage. Ankara suffered some damage including the destruction of 838 houses and 10 shops. Many public buildings were also found to have suffered minor damage.

=== Casualties ===
There were casualties recorded in four provinces. In Bolu Province (which includes Gerede) there were 2,501 dead and 1,815 injured, in Çankırı Province there were 1,314 dead and 381 injured, in Zonguldak Province there were 330 dead and 371 injured, in Ankara Province there were 125 dead and 158 injured, giving a total of 4,270 dead and 2,725 injured.

== Aftermath ==
Many of the inhabitants of the worst-affected areas had to live in tents for a long period. Huts to provide temporary accommodation were also built, although their construction was initially hampered by a shortage of nails.

In Bolu Province, people who were badly-affected by the earthquake were offered long-term loans by the Ziraat Bank. This included aid for farmers that had lost livestock. An initial amount of 120,000 lira was sent to the province by the government, mostly for the repair of official buildings.

Aid was collected by various organisations across Turkey. Money from some donors was sent to the Red Crescent. Appeals for money went out, particularly in Ankara and Istanbul, often organised by chambers of commerce. SIgnificant sums were raised by commercial concerns and by schools.

== See also ==
- List of earthquakes in 1944
- List of earthquakes in Turkey
