= Tuztaşı, Ayvacık =

Village in Turkey

Tuztaşı
- Village
- Location in Turkey Tuztaşı (Marmara)
- Coordinates: 39°39′53″N 26°36′29″E
- Country: Turkey
- Province: Çanakkale
- District: Ayvacık
- Population (2021): 48
- Time zone: UTC+3 (TRT)

Tuztaşı is a village in the Ayvacık District of Çanakkale Province in Turkey. Its population is 48 (2021).
