= Yukarıköy, Ayvacık =

Village in Turkey

Yukarıköy
- Village
- Country: Turkey
- Province: Çanakkale
- District: Ayvacık
- Population (2021): 707
- Time zone: UTC+3 (TRT)

Yukarıköy is a village in the Ayvacık District of Çanakkale Province in Turkey. Its population is 707 (2021).
