= Küçükhusun, Ayvacık =

Village in Turkey

Küçükhusun
- Village
- Location in Turkey Küçükhusun (Marmara)
- Coordinates: 39°38′N 26°30′E
- Country: Turkey
- Province: Çanakkale
- District: Ayvacık
- Population (2021): 149
- Time zone: UTC+3 (TRT)

Küçükhusun is a village in the Ayvacık District of Çanakkale Province in Turkey. Its population is 149 (2021).
