= Çamkalabak, Ayvacık =

Village in Turkey

Çamkalabak
- Village
- Location in Turkey Çamkalabak (Marmara)
- Coordinates: 39°31′N 26°12′E
- Country: Turkey
- Province: Çanakkale
- District: Ayvacık
- Population (2021): 651
- Time zone: UTC+3 (TRT)

Çamkalabak is a village in the Ayvacık District of Çanakkale Province in Turkey. Its population was 651 in 2021.
