= Kösedere, Ayvacık =

Village in Turkey

Kösedere
- Village
- Country: Turkey
- Province: Çanakkale
- District: Ayvacık
- Population (2021): 705
- Time zone: UTC+3 (TRT)

Kösedere is a village in the Ayvacık District of Çanakkale Province in Turkey. Its population is 705 (2021).
