= Tartaşık, Ayvacık =

Village in Turkey

Tartaşık
- Village
- Location in Turkey Tartaşık (Marmara)
- Coordinates: 39°37′N 26°28′E
- Country: Turkey
- Province: Çanakkale
- District: Ayvacık
- Population (2021): 65
- Time zone: UTC+3 (TRT)

Tartaşık is a village in the Ayvacık District of Çanakkale Province in Turkey. Its population is 65 (2021).
