= List of earthquakes in 1944 =

Earthquakes in 1944
Approximate epicenters of the earthquakes in 1944
- 4.0–5.9 magnitude
- 6.0–6.9 magnitude
- 7.0–7.9 magnitude
- 8.0+ magnitude
- Strongest: Empire of Japan, off the south coast of Honshu (Magnitude 8.1) December 7
- Deadliest: Argentina, San Juan Province, Argentina (Magnitude 7.0) January 15 8,000 deaths
- Total fatalities: 11,637

Number by magnitude
- 9.0+: 0

This is a list of earthquakes in 1944. Only magnitude 6.0 or greater earthquakes appear on the list. Lower magnitude events are included if they have caused death, injury or damage. Events which occurred in remote areas will be excluded from the list as they wouldn't have generated significant media interest. All dates are listed according to UTC time. Activity was spread across the world during this year. The southwest Pacific Islands saw a good proportion of the earthquakes. Japan had the largest event of the year in December. Argentina and Turkey had the bulk of the deaths. The quake in Argentina in January was the worst in the country's history. New York State had its largest recorded earthquake in September causing some damage.

== Overall ==
=== By death toll ===
Rank	Death toll	Magnitude	Location	MMI	Depth (km)	Date
1	8,000	7.0	Argentina, San Juan Province, Argentina	VII (Very strong)	15.0	January 15
2	2,381	7.6	Turkey, Cankiri Province	X (Extreme)	30.0	February 1
3	1,223	8.1	Empire of Japan, off the south coast of Honshu	VIII (Severe)	15.0	December 7
4	30	6.8	Turkey, off the west coast of Balıkesir Province	IX (Violent)	15.0	October 6

- Note: At least 10 casualties

=== By magnitude ===
Rank	Magnitude	Death toll	Location	MMI	Depth (km)	Date
1	8.1	1,223	Empire of Japan, off the south coast of Honshu	VIII (Severe)	15.0	December 7
= 2	7.6	2,381	Turkey, Cankiri Province	X (Extreme)	30.0	February 1
= 2	7.6	0	Empire of Japan, West Papua (province), Dutch East Indies	VII (Very strong)	15.0	April 27
3	7.5	0	Empire of Japan, Lembata, Dutch East Indies	( )	156.6	March 22
4	7.3	0	Fiji	( )	632.7	May 25
= 5	7.2	0	Soviet Union, eastern Kamchatka Krai, Russia	VII (Very strong)	35.0	September 23
= 5	7.2	0	New Hebrides, Vanuatu	VI (Strong)	165.0	November 24
= 6	7.1	0	Australia, East Sepik Province, New Guinea	( )	114.4	January 7
= 6	7.1	0	, southeast of Maldives	( )	15.0	February 29
= 6	7.1	3	Republic of China (1912-1949), northern Xinjiang Province	VIII (Severe)	10.0	March 9
= 6	7.1	0	Australia, north of New Ireland (island), New Guinea	VI (Strong)	15.0	May 25
= 6	7.1	0	United States, Fox Islands, Alaska	( )	70.0	July 27
= 6	7.1	0	Empire of Japan, Santa Cruz Islands, Solomon Islands	VI (Strong)	35.0	November 16
= 7	7.0	8,000	Argentina San Juan Province, Argentina	VII (Very strong)	15.0	January 15
= 7	7.0	0	Peru, Puno Region	( )	183.1	February 29
= 7	7.0	0	Mexico, off the coast of Chiapas	VI (Strong)	25.0	June 28
= 7	7.0	0	Empire of Japan, Hokkaido	( )	75.0	October 2
= 7	7.0	0	France, southeast of Loyalty Islands, New Caledonia	( )	120.0	October 5
= 7	7.0	0	New Hebrides, Vanuatu	( )	180.0	November 29

- Note: At least 7.0 magnitude

== Notable events ==
=== January ===
January
- Strongest: 7.1 M_{w} Australia
- Deadliest: 7.0 M_{w} Argentina; 8,000 deaths
- Total fatalities: 8,000

Number by magnitude
- 8.0–8.9: 0
- 7.0–7.9: 2
- 6.0–6.9: 2

Date	Country and location	M_{w}	Depth (km)	MMI	Notes	Casualties	
Date	Country and location	M_{w}	Depth (km)	MMI	Notes	Dead	Injured
5	Empire of Japan, southern Sumatra, Dutch East Indies	6.6	45.0	VI			
7	Australia, East Sepik Province, New Guinea	7.1	114.4				
10	Mexico, Guerrero	6.6	15.0	VII			
15	Argentina, San Juan Province, Argentina	7.0	15.0	VII	The 1944 San Juan earthquake was the deadliest in Argentine history. 8,000 people were killed. Damage costs were $100 million (1944 rate).	8,000	

=== February ===
February
- Strongest: 7.6 M_{w} Turkey
- Deadliest: 7.6 M_{w} Turkey; 2,381 deaths
- Total fatalities: 2,381

Number by magnitude
- 8.0–8.9: 0
- 7.0–7.9: 3
- 6.0–6.9: 3

Date	Country and location	M_{w}	Depth (km)	MMI	Notes	Casualties	
Date	Country and location	M_{w}	Depth (km)	MMI	Notes	Dead	Injured
1	Turkey, Cankiri Province	7.6	30.0	X	2,381 people were killed and major damage was caused by the 1944 Bolu–Gerede earthquake.	2,381	
1	Empire of Japan, off the south coast of Hokkaido	6.6	160.0				
3	Canada, Yukon Territory	6.5	35.0				
5	Empire of Japan, Hualien County, Taiwan	6.5	20.0	VI			
29	Peru, Puno Region	7.0	183.1				
29	, southeast of Maldives	7.1	15.0				

=== March ===
March
- Strongest: 7.5 M_{w} Empire of Japan
- Deadliest: 7.1 M_{w} Republic of China (1912-1949); 3 deaths
- Total fatalities: 3

Number by magnitude
- 8.0–8.9: 0
- 7.0–7.9: 2
- 6.0–6.9: 2

Date	Country and location	M_{w}	Depth (km)	MMI	Notes	Casualties	
Date	Country and location	M_{w}	Depth (km)	MMI	Notes	Dead	Injured
9	Republic of China (1912-1949), northern Xinjiang Province	6.9	10.0	rowspan="2"| Doublet earthquake. 3 people were killed and some homes collapsed.			
9	Republic of China (1912-1949), northern Xinjiang Province	7.1	10.0	VIII	3		
22	Empire of Japan, Lembata, Dutch East Indies	7.5	156.6				
31	Empire of Japan, Banda Sea, Dutch East Indies	6.4	65.0				

=== April ===
April
- Strongest: 7.6 M_{w} Empire of Japan
- Total fatalities: 0

Number by magnitude
- 8.0–8.9: 0
- 7.0–7.9: 1
- 6.0–6.9: 3

Date	Country and location	M_{w}	Depth (km)	MMI	Notes	Casualties	
Date	Country and location	M_{w}	Depth (km)	MMI	Notes	Dead	Injured
7	Nicaragua, Chontales Department	6.0	200.0				
23	Fiji	6.5	370.0				
26	Empire of Japan, off the north coast of West Papua (province), Dutch East Indies	6.8	15.0	VII	Foreshock.		
27	Empire of Japan, off the north coast of West Papua (province), Dutch East Indies	7.6	15.0	VII			

=== May ===
May
- Strongest: 7.3 M_{w} Fiji
- Total fatalities: 0

Number by magnitude
- 8.0–8.9: 0
- 7.0–7.9: 2
- 6.0–6.9: 2

Date	Country and location	M_{w}	Depth (km)	MMI	Notes	Casualties	
Date	Country and location	M_{w}	Depth (km)	MMI	Notes	Dead	Injured
9	Colombia, Huila Department	6.0	100.0				
25	Fiji	7.3	632.7				
25	Australia, north of New Ireland (island), New Guinea	7.1	15.0	VI			
27	Italian Social Republic, Dodecanese Islands, Greece	6.2	100.0				

=== June ===
June
- Strongest: 7.0 M_{w} Mexico
- Total fatalities: 0

Number by magnitude
- 8.0–8.9: 0
- 7.0–7.9: 1
- 6.0–6.9: 2

Date	Country and location	M_{w}	Depth (km)	MMI	Notes	Casualties	
Date	Country and location	M_{w}	Depth (km)	MMI	Notes	Dead	Injured
8	Peru, Ucayali Region	6.2	600.0				
25	Free France, southeast of the Loyalty Islands, New Caledonia	6.8	35.0				
28	Mexico, off the coast of Chiapas	7.0	25.0	VI			

=== July ===
July
- Strongest: 7.1 M_{w} United States
- Total fatalities: 0

Number by magnitude
- 8.0–8.9: 0
- 7.0–7.9: 1
- 6.0–6.9: 3

Date	Country and location	M_{w}	Depth (km)	MMI	Notes	Casualties	
Date	Country and location	M_{w}	Depth (km)	MMI	Notes	Dead	Injured
10	Samoa	6.8	185.0				
12	United States, southern Idaho	6.1	10.0	VII			
23	Argentina, Jujuy Province	6.0	250.0				
27	United States, Fox Islands (Alaska)	7.1	70.0				

=== August ===
August
- Strongest: 6.9 M_{w} Empire of Japan 2 events
- Total fatalities: 0

Number by magnitude
- 8.0–8.9: 0
- 7.0–7.9: 0
- 6.0–6.9: 5

Date	Country and location	M_{w}	Depth (km)	MMI	Notes	Casualties	
Date	Country and location	M_{w}	Depth (km)	MMI	Notes	Dead	Injured
14	United States, southern Alaska	6.3	100.0				
15	Empire of Japan, Northern Mariana Islands	6.9	120.7				
18	Empire of Japan, Yamagata Prefecture, Honshu	6.9	131.8				
24	Mexico, Chiapas	6.0	100.0				
30	New Hebrides, Espiritu Santo, Vanuatu	6.8	25.0				

=== September ===
September
- Strongest: 7.2 M_{w} Soviet Union
- Total fatalities: 0

Number by magnitude
- 8.0–8.9: 0
- 7.0–7.9: 1
- 6.0–6.9: 5
- 5.0–5.9: 1

Date	Country and location	M_{w}	Depth (km)	MMI	Notes	Casualties	
Date	Country and location	M_{w}	Depth (km)	MMI	Notes	Dead	Injured
5	United States, northern New York State	5.5	12.0	VIII	The 1944 Cornwall-Massena earthquake caused $2 million (1944 rate) in property damage. This was the largest event in state history.		
6	France, southeast of the Loyalty Islands, New Caledonia	6.5	120.0				
6	Ethiopian Empire, Oromia Region	6.0	35.0				
11	Empire of Japan, Molucca Sea, Dutch East Indies	6.6	15.0				
14	Empire of Japan, south of Java, Dutch East Indies	6.8	35.0				
23	Soviet Union, eastern Kamchatka Krai, Russia	7.2	35.0	VII			
27	Republic of China (1912-1949), western Xinjiang Province	6.8	20.0	VII	Some homes were destroyed.		

=== October ===
October
- Strongest: 7.0 M_{w} 2 events
- Deadliest: 6.8 M_{w} Turkey; 30 deaths
- Total fatalities: 30

Number by magnitude
- 8.0–8.9: 0
- 7.0–7.9: 2
- 6.0–6.9: 8

Date	Country and location	M_{w}	Depth (km)	MMI	Notes	Casualties	
Date	Country and location	M_{w}	Depth (km)	MMI	Notes	Dead	Injured
2	Guatemala, Jutiapa Department	6.5	160.0				
2	Empire of Japan, Hokkaido	7.0	75.0				
5	Australia, east of New Ireland (island), New Guinea	6.9	75.0				
5	France, southeast of the Loyalty Islands, New Caledonia	7.0	120.0				
6	Turkey, off the west coast of Balikesir Province	6.8	15.0	IX	AT least 30 people were killed and 5,500 homes were destroyed during the 1944 Gulf of Edremit–Ayvacik earthquake.	30	
11	Samoa	6.8	15.0				
14	Empire of Japan, Halmahera, Dutch East Indies	6.6	15.0	VII			
17	Tibet, Tibet (1912-1951)	6.8	20.0	VII			
23	Ecuador, Esmeraldas Province	6.7	20.0	VII			
29	Tibet, Tibet (1912-1951)	6.5	20.0	VII	Aftershock of October 17 event.		

=== November ===
November
- Strongest: 7.2 M_{w} New Hebrides
- Total fatalities: 0

Number by magnitude
- 8.0–8.9: 0
- 7.0–7.9: 3
- 6.0–6.9: 2

Date	Country and location	M_{w}	Depth (km)	MMI	Notes	Casualties	
Date	Country and location	M_{w}	Depth (km)	MMI	Notes	Dead	Injured
15	Empire of Japan, Talaud Islands, Dutch East Indies	6.8	60.0	VI			
16	Empire of Japan, Santa Cruz Islands, Solomon Islands	7.1	35.0	VI			
24	New Hebrides, Vanuatu	7.2	165.0	VI			
29	New Hebrides, Vanuatu	7.0	180.0				
30	Fiji	6.8	180.0				

=== December ===
December
- Strongest: 8.1 M_{w} Empire of Japan
- Deadliest: 8.1 M_{w} Empire of Japan; 1,223 deaths
- Total fatalities: 1,223

Number by magnitude
- 8.0–8.9: 1
- 7.0–7.9: 0
- 6.0–6.9: 10

Date	Country and location	M_{w}	Depth (km)	MMI	Notes	Casualties	
Date	Country and location	M_{w}	Depth (km)	MMI	Notes	Dead	Injured
4	Empire of Japan, Northern Mariana Islands	6.8	56.7				
7	Empire of Japan, off the south coast of Honshu	8.1	15.0	VII	Major destruction was caused by the 1944 Tōnankai earthquake. 1,223 deaths and 2,135 injuries were caused. 26,146 homes were destroyed. A tsunami contributed to the damage.	1,223	2,135
7	Empire of Japan, off the south coast of Honshu	6.5	0.0		Aftershock.		
10	New Hebrides, Vanuatu	6.6	15.0	VI			
12	United States, Andreanof Islands, Alaska	6.5	35.0				
12	Empire of Japan, off the south coast of Honshu	6.7	0.0		Aftershock.		
19	Republic of China (1912-1949), Liaoning Province	6.6	35.0	VII			
21	France, southeast of the Loyalty Islands, New Caledonia	6.5	100.0				
22	Chile, Antofagasta Region	6.5	45.3	VI			
27	Australia, south of New Britain, New Guinea	6.5	35.0	V			
28	Australia, West New Britain Province, New Guinea	6.8	95.0				
