= İlyasfakı, Ayvacık =

Village in Turkey

İlyasfakı
- Village
- Location in Turkey İlyasfakı (Marmara)
- Coordinates: 39°33′N 26°22′E
- Country: Turkey
- Province: Çanakkale
- District: Ayvacık
- Population (2021): 129
- Time zone: UTC+3 (TRT)

İlyasfakı is a village in the Ayvacık District of Çanakkale Province in Turkey. Its population is 129 (2021).
