= Kozlu, Ayvacık =

Village in Turkey

Kozlu
- Village
- Location in Turkey Kozlu (Marmara)
- Coordinates: 39.5305°N 26.4138°E
- Country: Turkey
- Province: Çanakkale
- District: Ayvacık
- Population (2021): 260
- Time zone: UTC+3 (TRT)

Kozlu is a village in the Ayvacık District of Çanakkale Province in Turkey. Its population is 260 (2021).
