= Arıklı, Ayvacık =

Village in Turkey

Arıklı
- Village
- Location in Turkey Arıklı (Marmara)
- Coordinates: 39°33′7″N 26°31′49″E
- Country: Turkey
- Province: Çanakkale
- District: Ayvacık
- Population (2021): 211
- Time zone: UTC+3 (TRT)

Arıklı is a village in the Ayvacık District of Çanakkale Province in Turkey. Its population is 211 (2021).
