= Habib Bektaş =

German-Turkish writer

Habib Bektaş (Salihli, 1 March 1951) is a German-Turkish writer who has lived in Germany since 1972.

He lives with his wife in Erlangen and he has two adult children. In Germany he has worked in several places (restaurants, pharmaceutical enterprises...) and as a columnist of the journals Evrensel and Yeni Hayat.

== Prizes ==
- 1982: Kulturförderpreis der Stadt Erlangen
- 1989: Romanpreis des Milliyet Verlagshauses für den Roman Hamriyanım
- 1997: Romanpreis des İnkılap Verlages für den Roman Gölge Kokusu
- 2000: Türk Dil Derneği Ömer Asim Aksoy Preis des Instituts für die türkische Sprache für den Roman Cennetin Arka Bahçesi

== Works ==
- 1989 Yorgun Ölü, Yaba Verlag, Ankara
- 1989 Hamriyanım, Remzi Verlag, Istanbul
- 1981 Belagerung des Lebens, Ararat Verlag Berlin
- 1983 Erlangen şiirleri, Derinlik Verlag, Istanbul
- 1984 ohne dich ist jede stadt eine wüste, Damnitz-Verlag, München
- 1985 Reden die Sterne, Damnitz-Verlag, München
- 1985 Adresinde yoktur, Dayanışma Verlag, Ankara
- 1989 Das vergessene wachsen, art-direct Verlag Erlangen,
- 1991 Das Länderspiel, Heliopolis-Verlag, Tübingen
- 1991 Uyuşturucu Batağı, Milliyet Verlag, Istanbul
- 1991 Mein Freund, der Opabaum, Boje Verlag, Erlangen
- 1991 Şirin wünscht sich einen Weihnachtsbaum, Ravensburger-Verlag
- 1992 Sözü Yurt Edindim, Broy Verlag, Istanbul
- 1994 Metin macht Geschichten, Boje Verlag, Erlangen
- 1996 wie wir Kinder (Kindergedichte für Erw.), Verlag der Ev.-Luth. Mission Erlg
- 1997 Zaghaft meine Sehnsucht, Horlemann Verlag, Bonn
- 1997 Alamancı Metin, Kultusministerium der Türkei, Ankara
- 1997 Gölge Kokusu, İnkılap Verlag, Istanbul
- 1997 Meyhane Dedikleri, İnkılap Verlag, Istanbul
- 2000 Cennetin Arka Bahçesi, Can Verlag, Istanbul
- 2001 Ben Öykülere İnanırım, Can Verlag, Istanbul
- 2002 babel zum trotz, Horleman Verlag, Bonn
- 2005 Ein Gewöhnlicher Tag, Sardes Verlag, Erlangen
- 2006 Ein Päckchen `H`, Sardes Verlag, Erlangen
- 2006 Farbe des Lichts, Sardes Verlag, Erlangen
- 2007 Hamriyanım – Frau Teig, Sardes Verla
- 2008 Hinterhof des Paradieses (Roman) Sardes Verlag, Erlangen
- 2008 Ein Gedicht, ohne Widmung, Sardes Verlag, Erlangen
- 2009 Das Gedächtnis der Spiegel,€ Sardes Verlag, Erlangen
- 2010 Ay Terazin Olsun, Yasak Meyve Verlag, İstanbul

== External links and references ==
- DNB (in German)
- https://web.archive.org/web/20120409190245/http://www.habibbektas.com/
