= Güzelköy, Ayvacık =

Village in Turkey

Güzelköy
- Village
- Location in Turkey Güzelköy (Marmara)
- Coordinates: 39.6416°N 26.5402°E
- Country: Turkey
- Province: Çanakkale
- District: Ayvacık
- Population (2021): 188
- Time zone: UTC+3 (TRT)

Güzelköy is a village in the Ayvacık District of Çanakkale Province in Turkey. Its population is 188 (2021).
