= Ahmetler, Ayvacık =

Village in Turkey

Ahmetler
- Village
- Location in Turkey Ahmetler (Marmara)
- Coordinates: 39.5987°N 26.3046°E
- Country: Turkey
- Province: Çanakkale
- District: Ayvacık
- Population (2021): 27
- Time zone: UTC+3 (TRT)

Ahmetler is a village in the Ayvacık District of Çanakkale Province in Turkey. Its population is 27 (2021).
