= Sapanca, Ayvacık =

Village in Turkey

Sapanca
- Village
- Location in Turkey Sapanca (Marmara)
- Coordinates: 39.6486°N 26.4111°E
- Country: Turkey
- Province: Çanakkale
- District: Ayvacık
- Population (2021): 180
- Time zone: UTC+3 (TRT)

Sapanca is a village in the Ayvacık District of Çanakkale Province in Turkey. Its population is 180 (2021).
