= Korubaşı, Ayvacık =

Village in Turkey

Korubaşı
- Village
- Location in Turkey Korubaşı (Marmara)
- Coordinates: 39.5158°N 26.2611°E
- Country: Turkey
- Province: Çanakkale
- District: Ayvacık
- Population (2021): 452
- Time zone: UTC+3 (TRT)

Korubaşı is a village in the Ayvacık District of Çanakkale Province in Turkey. Its population is 452 (2021).
