= Baharlar, Ayvacık =

Village in Turkey

Baharlar
- Village
- Location in Turkey Baharlar (Marmara)
- Coordinates: 39.6683°N 26.5680°E
- Country: Turkey
- Province: Çanakkale
- District: Ayvacık
- Population (2021): 82
- Time zone: UTC+3 (TRT)

Baharlar is a village in the Ayvacık District of Çanakkale Province in Turkey. Its population is 82 (2021).
