= Erecek, Ayvacık =

Village in Turkey

Erecek
- Village
- Location in Turkey Erecek (Marmara)
- Coordinates: 39°33′51″N 26°19′8″E
- Country: Turkey
- Province: Çanakkale
- District: Ayvacık
- Population (2021): 57
- Time zone: UTC+3 (TRT)

Erecek is a village in the Ayvacık District of Çanakkale Province in Turkey. Its population is 57 (2021).
