= Bektaş, Ayvacık =

Village in Turkey

Bektaş
- Village
- Location in Turkey Bektaş (Marmara)
- Coordinates: 39.5013°N 26.2367°E
- Country: Turkey
- Province: Çanakkale
- District: Ayvacık
- Population (2021): 352
- Time zone: UTC+3 (TRT)

Bektaş is a village in the Ayvacık District of Çanakkale Province in Turkey. Its population is 352 (2021).
