= Adatepe Olive Oil Museum =

Agricultural Museum in Küçükkuyu, Turkey

- Established: 2001
- Location: Adatepe, Kuçükkuyu, Ayvacık, Çanakkale Province
- Type: Agricultural Museum
- Website: https://www.adatepe.com

Adatepe Olive Oil Museum (Turkish: Zeytinyağı Müzesi) is a museum complex inside the town of Küçükkuyu in Çanakkale Province, Turkey, located on Turkish state highway connecting İzmir to Çanakkale. In 2001, an abandoned soap plant was repurposed to be the first olive oil museum in Turkey.

The museum exhibits the tools about olive and olive oil. These include olive presses, harvesting and storage equipment. Folkloric material around Adatepe is also exhibited. Olive oil related products are sold in the museum, which have been found to be one of the purest and of highest quality.
