= Assos =

Town in Turkey

- Ἄσσος (Ancient Greek); Assus (Latin)
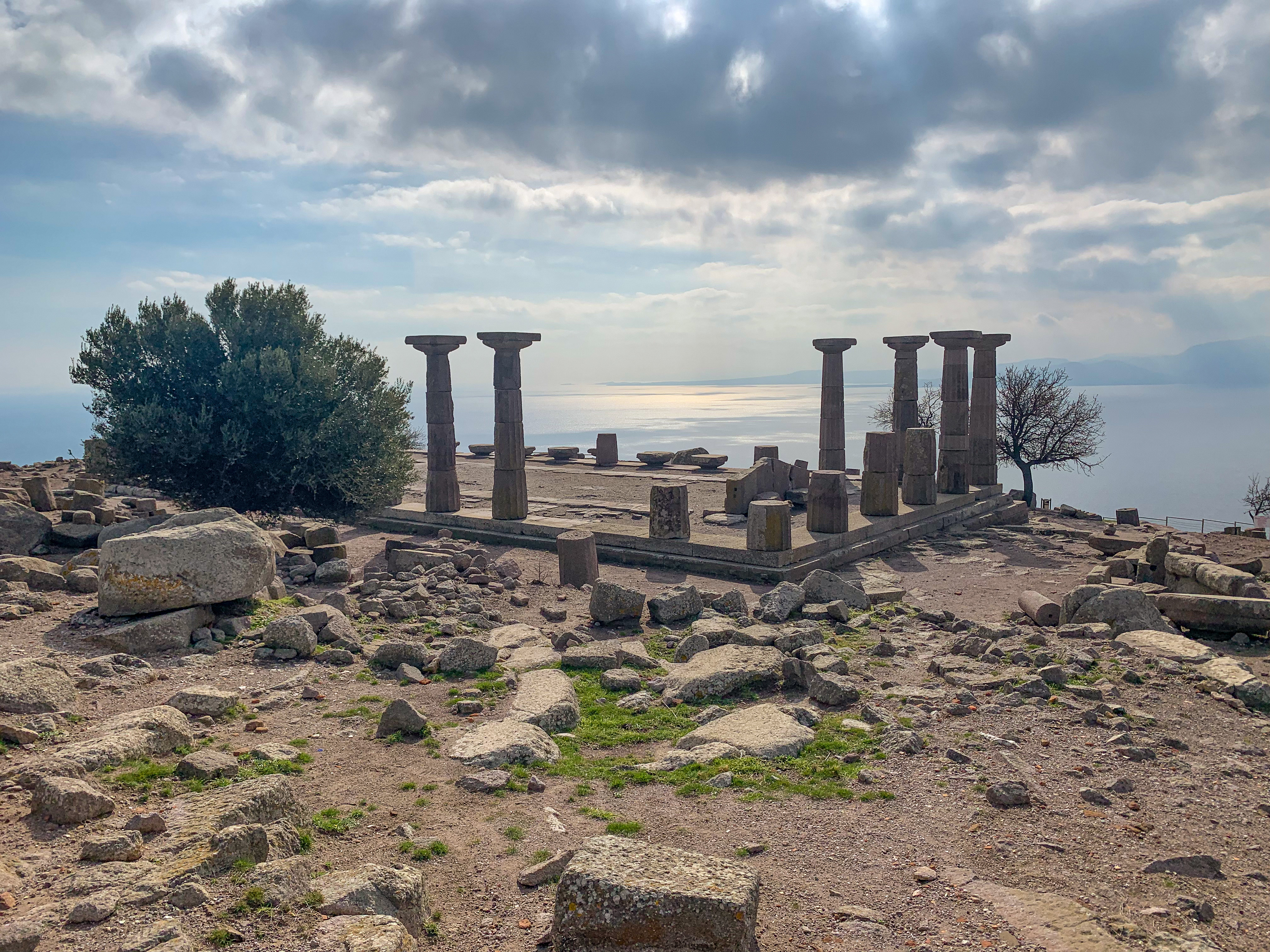
- Ruins of the Temple of Athena in Assos

- Location within Marmara Location within Turkey
- 39°29′16″N 26°20′13″E
- Type: Settlement
- Associated with: Aristotle
- Location: Ayvacık, Çanakkale Province, Turkey
- Region: Troad

History
- Built: 10th century BC
- Built by: Colonists from Mithymna

Site notes
- Website: Assos Archaeological Site

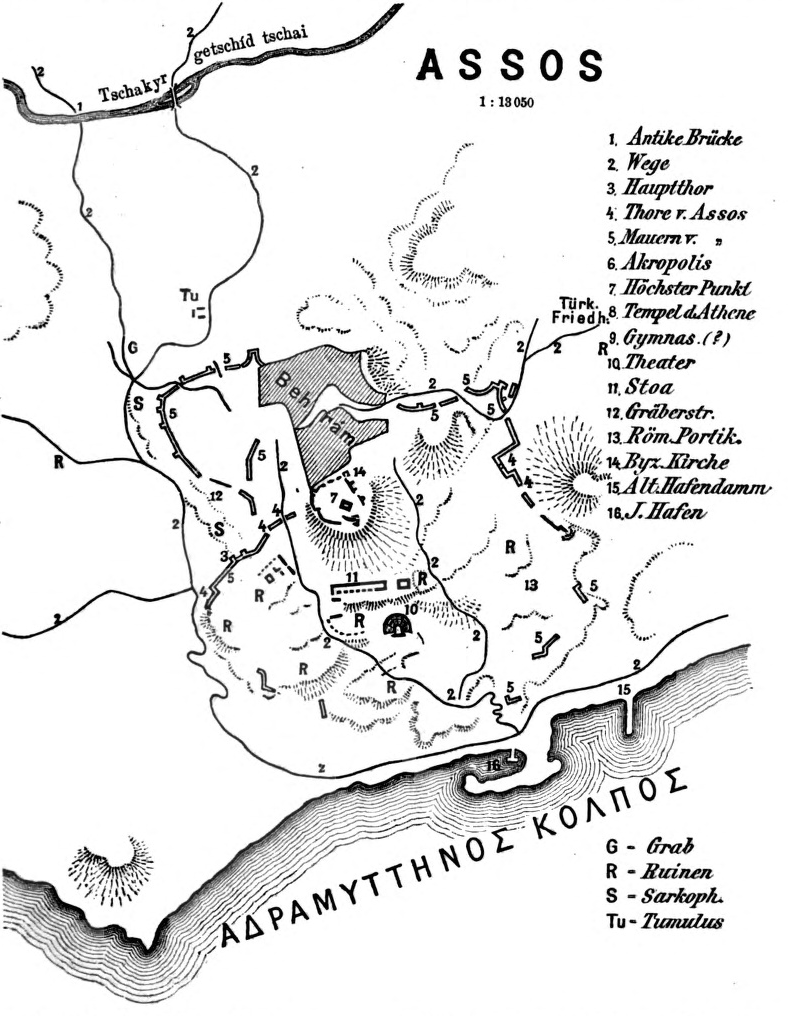
Map of Assos

Assos (/ˈæsɒs/; Ancient Greek: Ἄσσος, Latin: Assus) was an ancient Greek city near today's Behramkale (pronounced [behˈɾamkale]) or Behram for short, which most people still call by its ancient name of Assos. It is located on the Aegean coast in the Ayvacık district of Çanakkale province, Turkey. It is on the southern side of Biga Peninsula (better known by its ancient name of the Troad). Assos sits on the coast of the Adramyttian Gulf (Turkish: Edremit Körfezi) and used to offer the only good harbour along the 80 kilometres (50 mi) of coast which made it very important for shipping in the Troad.

During Pliny the Elder's lifetime (1st century AD), the city was also known as Apollonia (Ἀπολλωνία).

Assos' most famous resident was the Greek philosopher Aristotle. Assos is also the birthplace of Cleanthes, who later was to succeed Zeno of Citium as head of the Stoic school of philosophy. The Acts of the Apostles also refers to visits to the city by Luke the Evangelist and Paul the Apostle.

Today, Assos is a holiday retreat amid ancient ruins. In 2017 it was inscribed on the UNESCO Tentative list of World Heritage Sites in Turkey.

== History ==
=== Antiquity ===
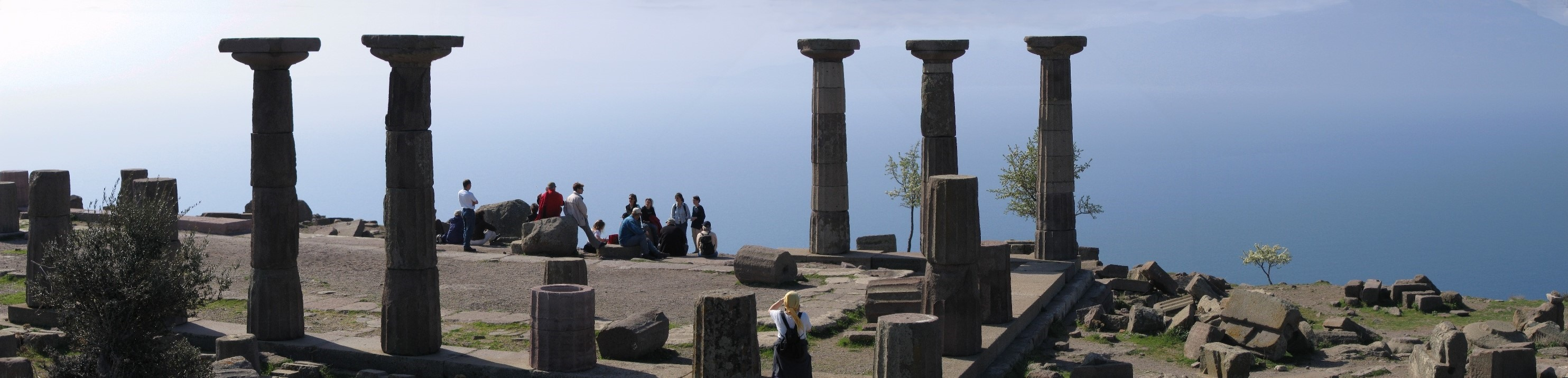
Temple of Athena in Assos, overlooking the Aegean

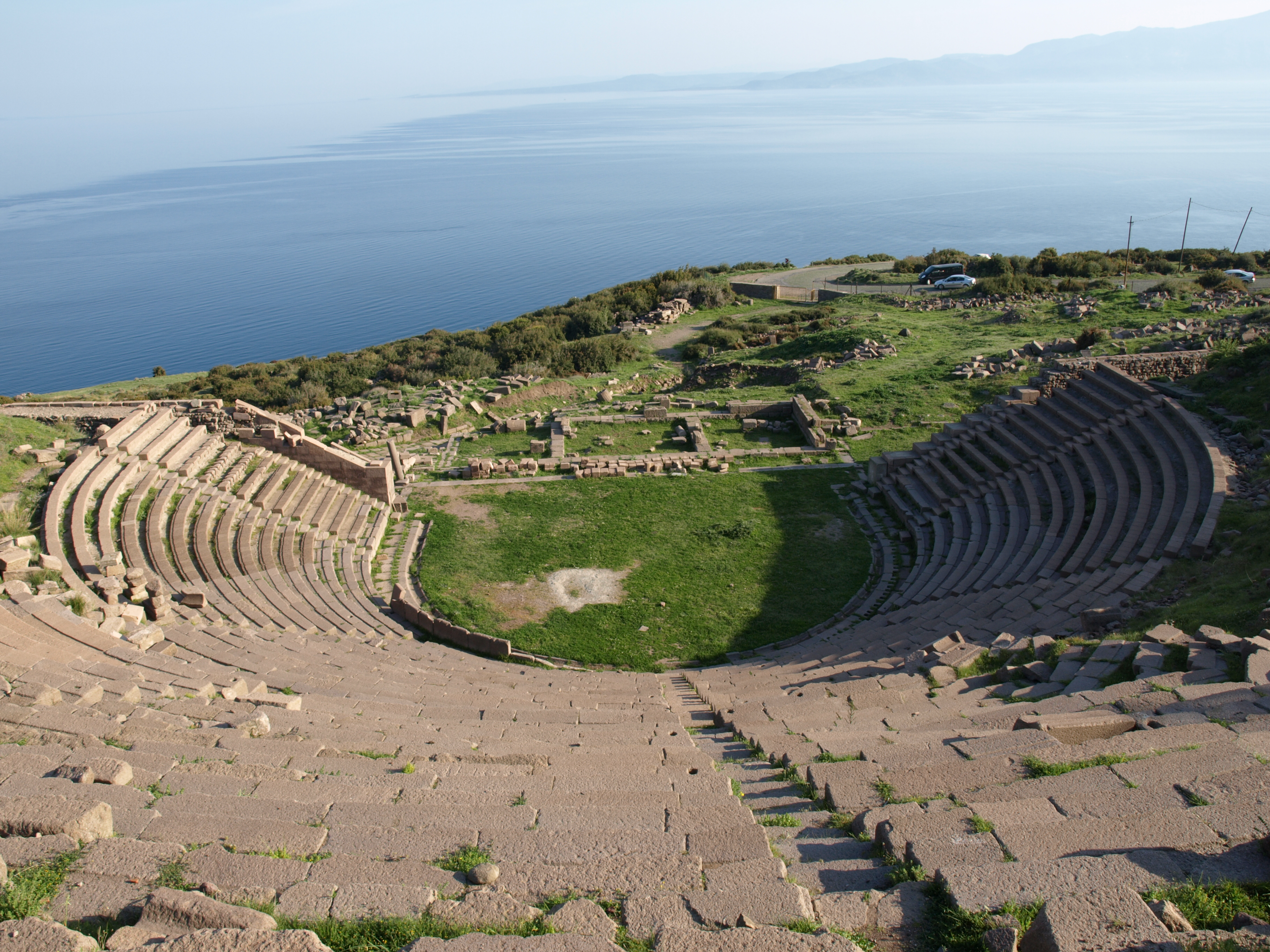
Ancient theatre of Assos overlooking the Aegean, with the island of Lesbos on the horizon to the right

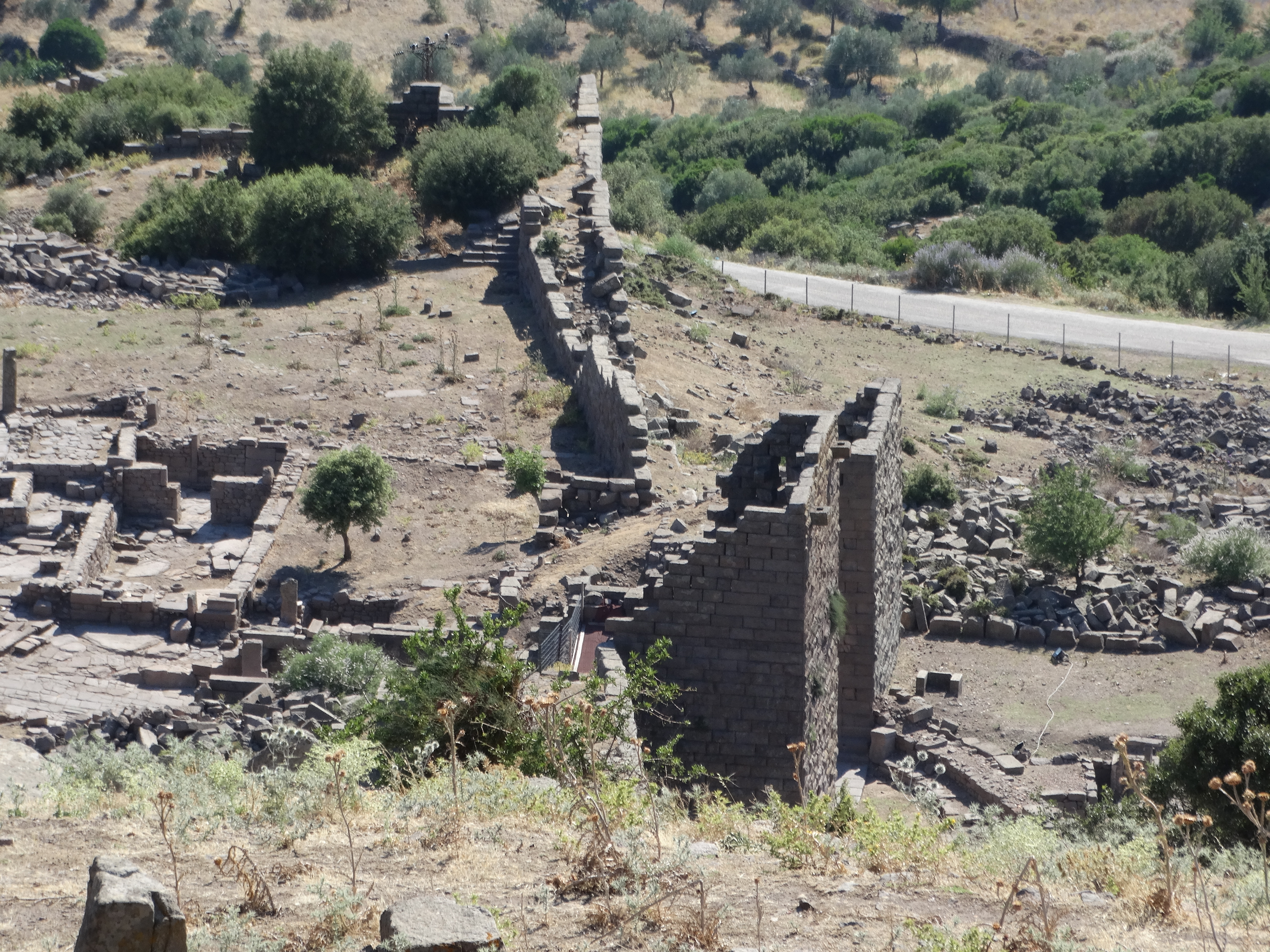
City walls

The city was founded from 1000 to 900 BC by Aeolian colonists from Lesbos, who are said to have come from Methymna. The settlers built a Doric Temple to Athena on top of the dominant crag in 530 BC. From this temple Hermias of Atarneus, a student of Plato, ruled Assos, the Troad and Lesbos during the town's greatest period of prosperity. (Strangely, Hermias was actually the slave of the ruler of Atarneus.) Hermias encouraged philosophers to move to the city and one of those who answered the call was Aristotle, who came here in 348 BC and married Hermeias's niece, Pythia. Aristotle founded an Academy in Assos where he became chief amongst a group of philosophers, and together with them, made innovative observations on zoology and biology. Assos' 'golden period' ended several years later when the Persians arrived and tortured Hermias to death. Aristotle then fled to Macedonia, which was ruled by his friend King Philip II of Macedon and where he became tutor to Philip's son, Alexander the Great. A modern statue of Aristotle greets visitors at the entrance to Assos.

The Persians were driven out by Alexander the Great in 334 BC. Not long afterwards Assos became the birthplace of Cleanthes, who later succeeded Zeno of Citium as head of the Stoic school of philosophy in Athens. Between 241 and 133 BC, the city was ruled by the Kings of Pergamon. However, in 133 BC, the Pergamons lost control of the city and it was absorbed into the Roman empire.

According to Christian tradition, St. Paul visited the city during his third missionary journey (53-57 AD) through Asia Minor on his way to Mytilene on the island of Lesbos. Acts 20 records that Luke the Evangelist and his companions ('we') "went ahead to the ship and sailed [from Troas] to Assos, there intending to take Paul on board ... and when he met us at Assos, we took him on board and came to Mitylene".

=== Middle Ages ===
During Byzantine times the city was called Makhramion (Μαχράμιον) from a Byzantine officer named Makhram, hence its modern name of Behramkale.

In the early 14th century, the town was filled with refugees from Mysia, who were fleeing from Turkish raiders who invaded Western Anatolia. The Turks attacked the region and the city's population, along with the refugees, abandoned Makhramion and fled to the island of Mytilene.

From the Middle Ages there exist the Hüdavendigar Mosque and Bridge, dating back to the second half of the 14th century. The mosque is on the hilltop near the ruined temple while the bridge is off the road to Ayvacık.

=== Modern archaeological discoveries ===
The ruins of ancient Assos continue to be excavated. In 2018, archaeologists discovered an undamaged Hellenistic family grave with the name "Aristios" written on its cover. The grave contained the remains of a family of twenty-one. One of the family members was buried, while the remaining twenty were cremated and their ashes placed inside urn-like vases. The lids had been sealed with cement to prevent any foreign substance getting inside the urns. In 2018, archaeologists also discovered many strigils, some of them iron, but most of them bronze.

Archaeologists also uncovered a 2,200-year-old Hellenistic lion sculpture and a 1,500-year-old stone oven dating to the Byzantine period. The sculpture was unearthed from a structure used as an inn at that time, and one of the Byzantine period findings contained a cooking stove with three pots.

The pillars from the ancient port lay in the harbour for over a millennium. Eventually they were probably sold.

== Attractions ==
On the acropolis 238 m above sea level stand the remains of the only Doric order temple in Asia Minor, which was dedicated to Athena and dates to 530 BC. Six of the original 38 columns remain. In the early 1900s sculptures of the Temple of Athena were moved to museums including the Louvre.

The view from the temple extends to nearby Lesbos in the south, to Pergamum in the southeast and to Mount Ida in the east. To the northwest, two massive Hellenic columns still mark the entrance to the city.

West of the acropolis stands the well preserved 4th century BC city wall and main gate with 14-meter-high (46 ft) towers. An ancient paved road leads northeast through the gate to the ruins of a large 2nd-century BC gymnasium, a 2nd-century BC agora and a bouleuterion. Further south toward the seashore is a 3rd-century BC theatre built for 5,000 spectators. Also on the hillside are the remains of a cemetery full of broken sarcophagi which were "able to eat flesh", according to Pliny, hence their name.

Lower Assos has a small pebbly beach. Although the narrow road to İskele, the ex-fishing harbour, is steep and with sheer drops, a constant stream of cars and minibuses passes up and down it from dawn to dusk.

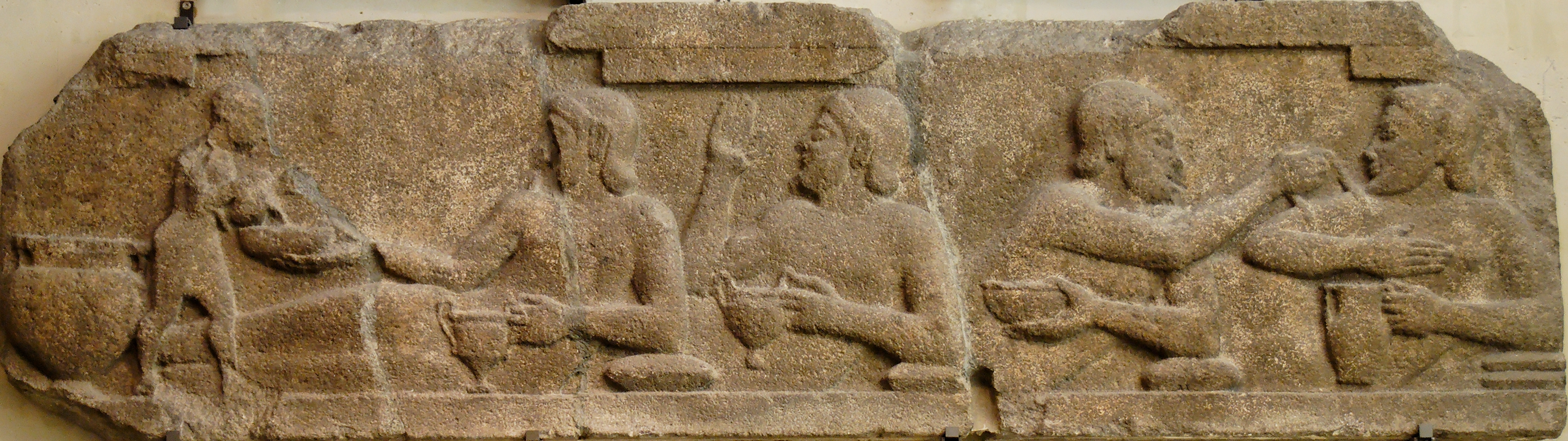
Architrave from the Temple of Athena; banquet scene showing Herakles (Louvre Museum)
