= Küçükkuyu, Ayvacık =

Küçükkuyu
- Municipality
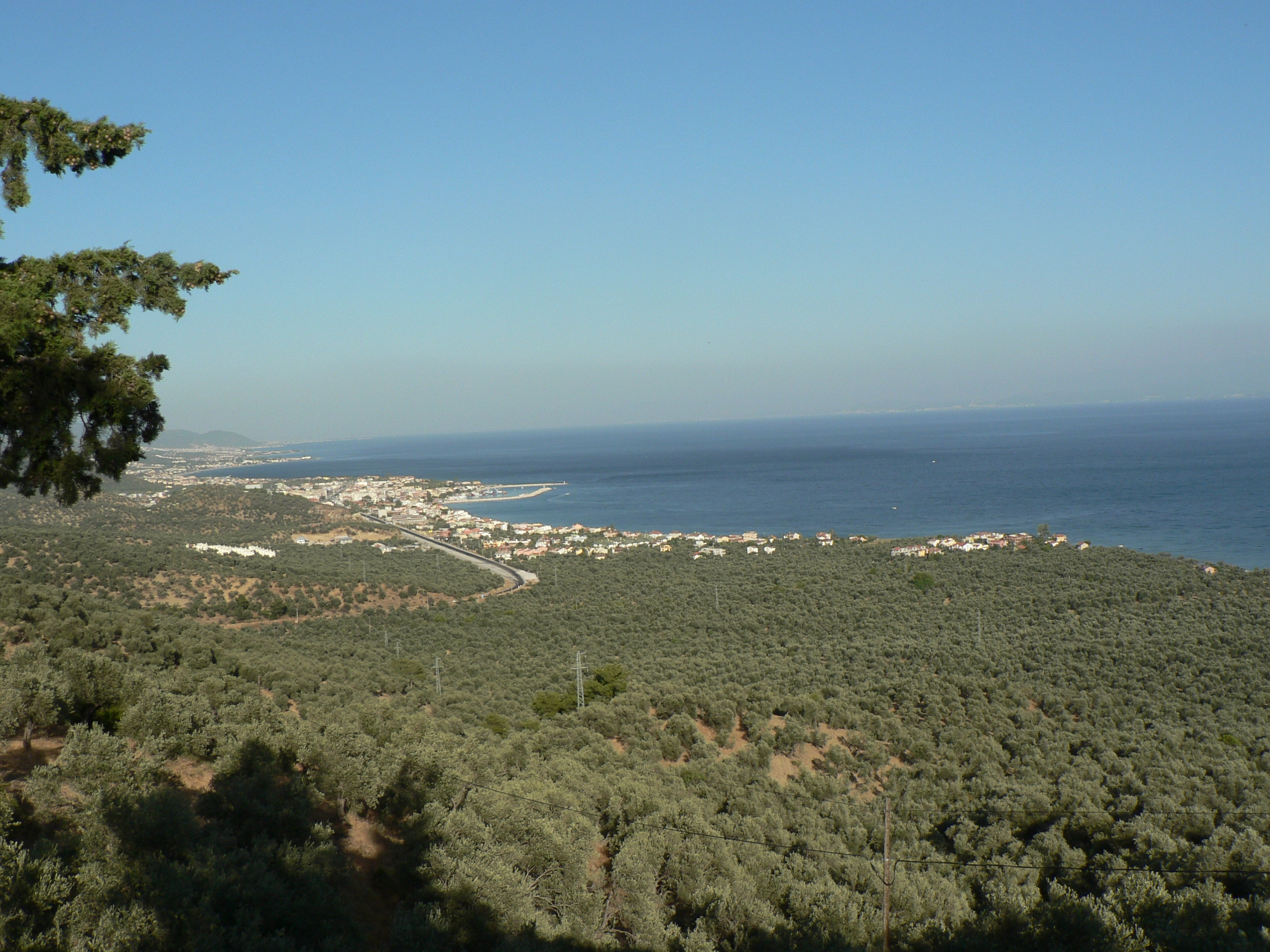
- A picture overlooking Küçükkuyu and the Edremit Gulf.

- Location within Turkey Location within Marmara
- Coordinates: 39°33′N 26°37′E
- Country: Turkey
- Province: Çanakkale
- District: Ayvacık
- Elevation: 8 m (26 ft)
- Population (2021): 10,604
- Time zone: UTC+3 (TRT)
- Postal code: 17980
- Area code: 0286

Küçükkuyu is a town (belde) in the Ayvacık District, Çanakkale Province, Turkey. Its population is 10,604 (2021).

== Geography ==
Küçükkuyu is a coastal town on the north shore of the Edremit Gulf of the Aegean Sea. The Greek island Lesbos is to the south west. Mount Ida, known from mythology, is to the north. The distance to Ayvacık is 25 kilometres (16 mi) and to Çanakkale is 95 kilometres (59 mi).

== History ==
Küçükkuyu and the surroundings is full of ruins of antiquity. According to legend, Zeus watched the battle of Troy from an altar near Küçükkuyu and Aphrodite discovered a source of healing water in Küçükkuyu. The present settlement was founded by Yörüks (nomadic Turkmens) and later Turkish refugees from Balkan countries also settled in Küçükkuyu. Küçükkuyu was declared a seat of township in 1989.

== Economy ==
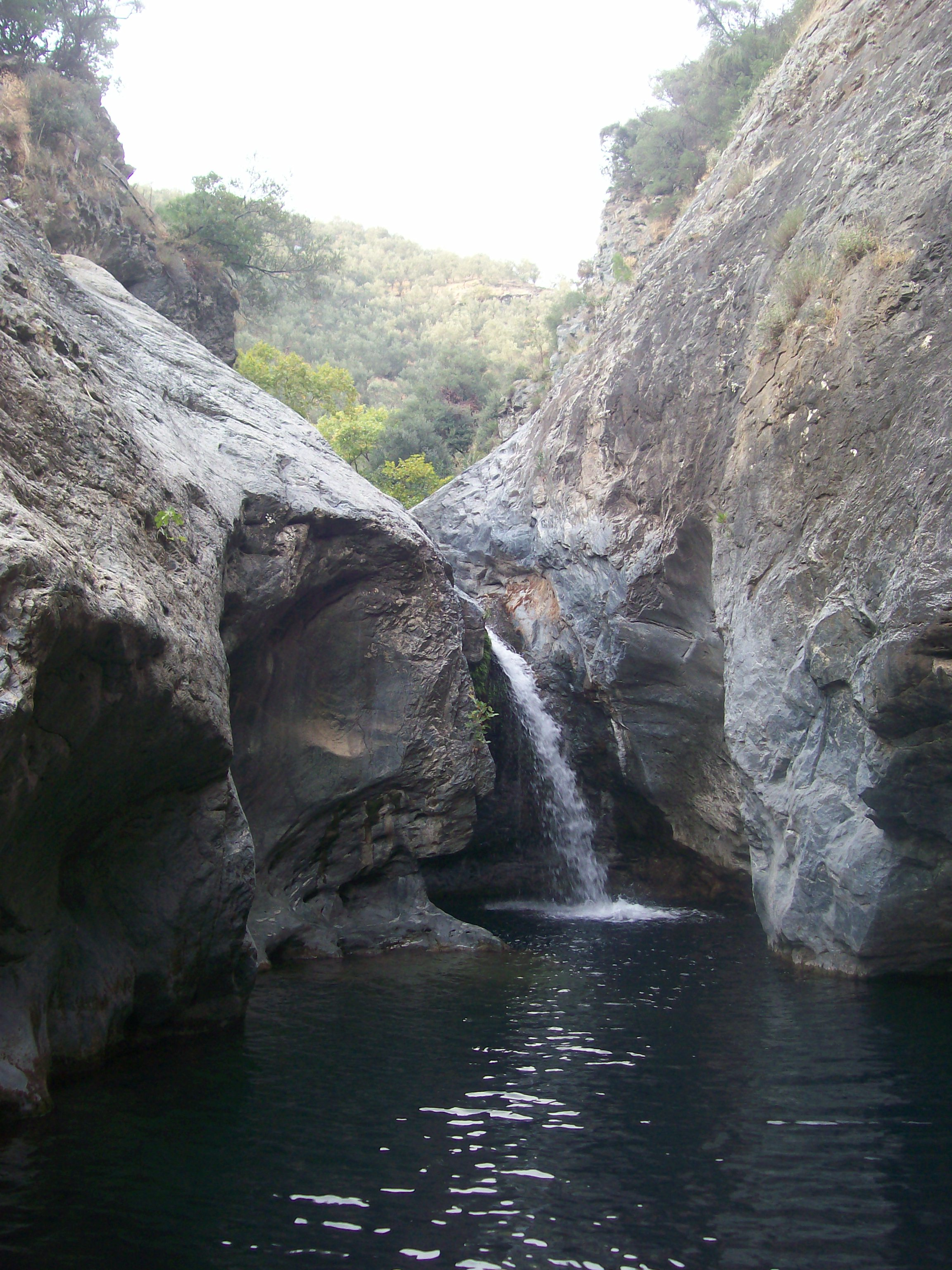
Waterfall near Küçükkuyu

The original economic activity of Küçükkuyu was olive agriculture and fishing. But it is a touristic town nowadays and the service sector constitutes another portion of town revenues. There are still many olive-related industries and the Adatepe Olive Oil Museum, located in the town, is a tribute to the olive legacy of the region.
