= Ayvacık, Çanakkale =

District in Çanakkale

Ayvacık
- Municipality
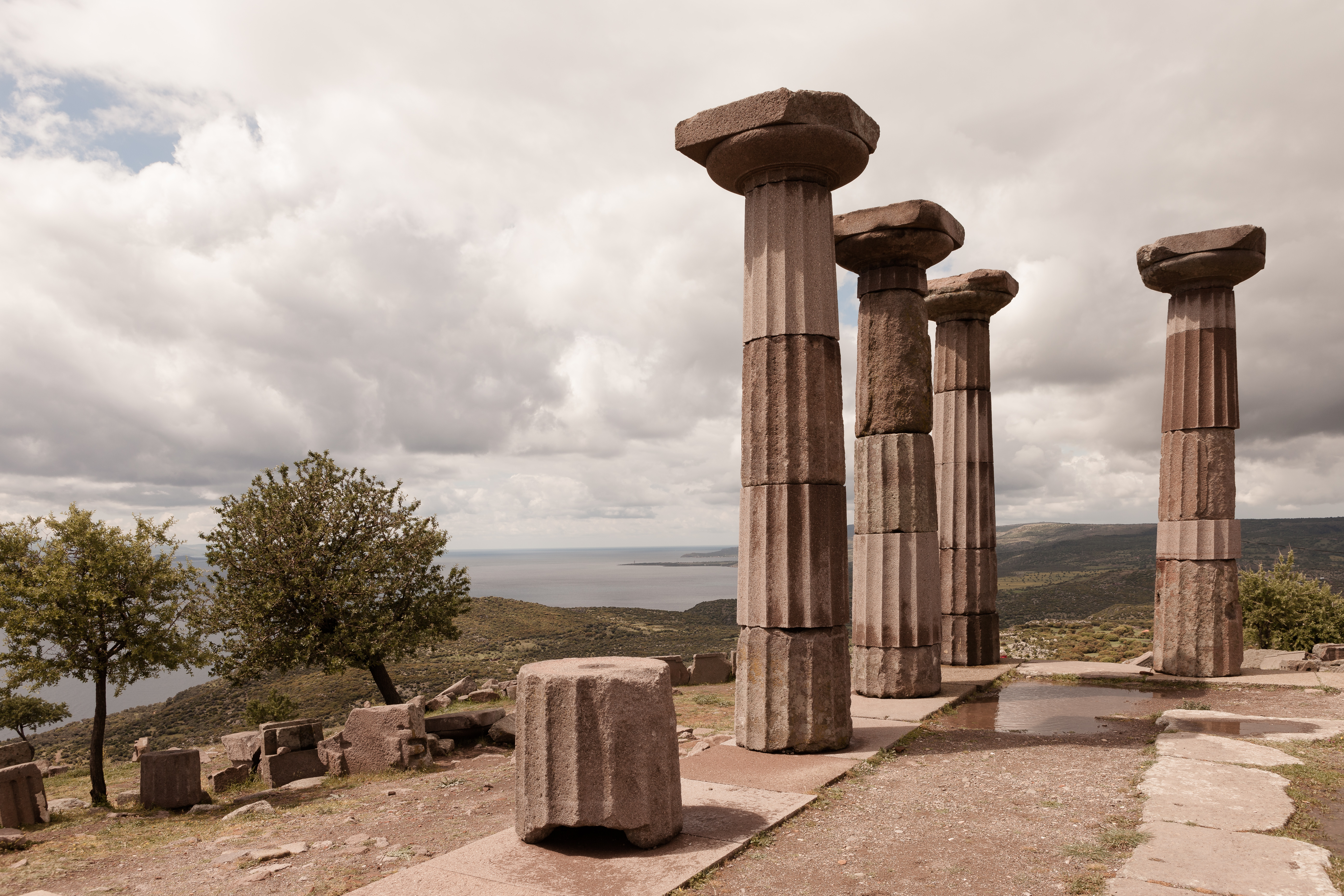
- Temple of Athena in Assos, Ayvacık

- Location within Turkey Location within Marmara
- Coordinates: 39°36′04″N 26°24′17″E
- Country: Turkey
- Province: Çanakkale
- District: Ayvacık

Government
  - Mayor: Mensur Bayram (CHP)
- Elevation: 251 m (823 ft)
- Population (2021): 9,710
- Time zone: UTC+3 (TRT)
- Postal code: 17860
- Area code: 0286
- Website: www.canakkaleayvacik.bel.tr

Ayvacık (Turkish: [ˈajvadʒɯk]) is a town in Çanakkale Province in the Marmara region of Turkey. It is the seat of Ayvacık District. Its population is 9,710 (2021). The town lies at an elevation of 252 m (827 ft). During the Gallipoli campaign in World War I, it was the target of several Allied attacks.

Ayvacik is mostly inhabited by settled Yörüks. The ancient Greek site of Assos can be found nearby.
